= Frisius Point =

Antarctic headland

Location of Nelson Island in the South Shetland Islands

Frisius Point (Bulgarian: нос Фризий, romanized: nos Frisius, IPA: [ˈnɔs ˈfrizij]) is the rocky north entrance point of Malak Sechko Cove and southwest entrance point of Golyam Sechko Cove projecting 450 m westwards from the northwest coast of Guangzhou Peninsula on Nelson Island in the South Shetland Islands, Antarctica. The area was visited by early 19th century sealers. Frisius Point is part of both Antarctic Specially Protected Area Harmony Point (ASPA 133) and the BirdLife International Important Bird Area Harmony Point, Nelson Island.

The feature is named after Gemma Frisius (Jemme Reinderszoon, 1508–1555), a Dutch mathematician, cartographer and instrument maker who was the first to describe how a chronometer could be used to determine longitude in navigation, and to propose the use of triangulation to accurately position places for mapmaking; in association with other names in the area deriving from the early development or use of geodetic instruments and methods.

== Location ==
Frisius Point is located at 62°17′27″S 59°13′53″W, which is 1.8 km north-northeast of Harmony Point and 2.45 km southwest of Sabin Point. British mapping of the area in 1968.

== Maps ==
- Livingston Island to King George Island. Scale 1:200000. Admiralty Nautical Chart 1776. Taunton: UK Hydrographic Office, 1968
- South Shetland Islands. Scale 1:200000 topographic map No. 3373. DOS 610 – W 62 58. Tolworth, UK, 1968
- Isla Nelson – Punta Armonía. Shetland del Sur. Escala 1:5000. Servicio Geográfico Militar del Uruguay, 1986
- Antarctic Digital Database (ADD). Scale 1:250000 topographic map of Antarctica. Scientific Committee on Antarctic Research (SCAR). Since 1993, regularly upgraded and updated
