= Besson Rock =

Rock in Antarctica

- Location within South Shetland Islands Location within Antarctica

Geography
- Location: Antarctica
- Coordinates: 62°14′56″S 59°11′10.7″W
- Archipelago: South Shetland Islands
- Area: 0.09 ha (0.22 acres)
- Length: 45 m (148 ft)
- Width: 32 m (105 ft)

Administration
- Administered under the Antarctic Treaty

Demographics
- Population: uninhabited

Besson Rock (Bulgarian: скала Бесон, romanized: skala Besson, IPA: [skɐˈla bɛˈsɔn]) is the rock off the northwest coast of Nelson Island in the South Shetland Islands, Antarctica extending 45 m in southeast–northwest direction and 32 m in southwest–northeast direction. Its surface area is 0.09 ha. The vicinity was visited by early 19th century sealers.

The feature is named after Jacques Besson (ca 1540–1573), a French inventor and mathematician who created the cosmolabe, an instrument to be used for navigation, surveying and cartography; in association with other names in the area deriving from the early development or use of geodetic instruments and methods.

== Location ==
Besson Rock is located at 62°14′56″S 59°11′10.7″W, which is 1.93 km north of Smilets Point, 2.78 km northeast of Folger Rock, 2.78 km southwest of Withem Island and 2.27 km west by north of Retamales Point. British mapping in 1968.

== See also ==
- List of Antarctic and subantarctic islands

== Maps ==
- Livingston Island to King George Island. Scale 1:200000. Admiralty Nautical Chart 1776. Taunton: UK Hydrographic Office, 1968.
- South Shetland Islands. Scale 1:200000 topographic map No. 3373. DOS 610 - W 62 58. Tolworth, UK, 1968.
- Antarctic Digital Database (ADD). Scale 1:250000 topographic map of Antarctica. Scientific Committee on Antarctic Research (SCAR). Since 1993, regularly upgraded and updated.
