= Yrvind Island =

Antarctic island

- Location within South Shetland Islands Location within Antarctica

Geography
- Location: Antarctica
- Coordinates: 62°15′49″S 59°10′38.4″W
- Archipelago: South Shetland Islands
- Area: 0.8 ha (2.0 acres)
- Length: 165 m (541 ft)
- Width: 70 m (230 ft)

Administration
- Administered under the Antarctic Treaty

Demographics
- Population: uninhabited

Yrvind Island (Bulgarian: остров Юрвинд, romanized: ostrov Yrvind, IPA: [ˈɔstrof ˈjurvind]) is the rocky island off the northwest coast of Nelson Island in the South Shetland Islands, Antarctica 165 m long in south–north direction and 70 m wide. Its surface area is 0.8 ha. The vicinity was visited by early 19th century sealers.

The feature is named after Sven Yrvind, a Swedish sailor and writer who invented the Bris sextant; in association with other names in the area deriving from the early development or use of geodetic instruments and methods.

== Location ==
Yrvind Island is located at 62°15′49″S 59°10′38.4″W, which is 635 m east-northeast of Smilets Point, 675 m southeast of Meldia Rock and 2.1 km southwest of Retamales Point. British mapping in 1968.

== See also ==
- List of Antarctic and subantarctic islands

== Maps ==
- Livingston Island to King George Island. Scale 1:200000. Admiralty Nautical Chart 1776. Taunton: UK Hydrographic Office, 1968.
- South Shetland Islands. Scale 1:200000 topographic map No. 3373. DOS 610 - W 62 58. Tolworth, UK, 1968.
- Antarctic Digital Database (ADD). Scale 1:250000 topographic map of Antarctica. Scientific Committee on Antarctic Research (SCAR). Since 1993, regularly upgraded and updated.
