= Discoduratere Nunatak =

Antarctic nunatak

Location of Nelson Island in the South Shetland Islands

Discoduratere Nunatak (Bulgarian: нунатак Дискодуратере, romanized: Nunatak Discoduratere, IPA: [ˈnunɐtak ˈdiskodurɐtɛrɛ]) is the rocky hill extending 180 m in southeast–northwest direction and 150 m wide, rising to 76 m at Quesada Cove on the north coast of Nelson Island in the South Shetland Islands, Antarctica.

The feature is named after the ancient Roman emporium and fortress of Discoduratere in Northern Bulgaria.

== Location ==
Discoduratere Nunatak is centred at 62°15′00″S 59°05′44″W, which is 940 m southeast of Baklan Point, 680 m south-southwest of Meana Point and 3.07 km southwest of Cariz Point. British mapping of the area in 1968.

== Maps ==
- Livingston Island to King George Island. Scale 1:200000. Admiralty Nautical Chart 1776. Taunton: UK Hydrographic Office, 1968
- South Shetland Islands. Scale 1:200000 topographic map No. 3373. DOS 610 - W 62 58. Tolworth, UK, 1968
- Antarctic Digital Database (ADD). Scale 1:250000 topographic map of Antarctica. Scientific Committee on Antarctic Research (SCAR). Since 1993, regularly upgraded and updated
