= Akin Island =

Island in Antarctica

- Location of Nelson Island in the South Shetland Islands

- Location within Antarctica Location within Antarctic Peninsula

Geography
- Location: Antarctica
- Coordinates: 62°13′41.5″S 59°05′50″W
- Archipelago: South Shetland Islands
- Length: 280 m (920 ft)
- Width: 100 m (300 ft)

Administration
- Administered under the Antarctic Treaty System

Demographics
- Population: Uninhabited

Akin Island (Bulgarian: остров Акин, romanized: ostrov Akin, IPA: [ˈɔstrof ɐˈkin]) is a wide, rocky island 280 m long in southeast-northwest direction and 100 m lying off the north coast of Nelson Island in the South Shetland Islands, Antarctica. It is “named after Akin Point on the Bulgarian Black Sea Coast.”

== Location ==
Akin Island is located at 62°13′41.5″S 59°05′50″W, which is 2.35 km west-northwest of Cariz Point, 2.02 km north-northeast of Baklan Point, 2.14 km east-northeast of Withem Island, 1.12 km south of Nancy Rock and 100 m north-northeast of Fregata Island. British mapping in 1968.

== Maps ==
- South Shetland Islands. Scale 1:200000 topographic map No. 3373. DOS 610 - W 62 58. Tolworth, UK, 1968.
- Antarctic Digital Database (ADD). Scale 1:250000 topographic map of Antarctica. Scientific Committee on Antarctic Research (SCAR). Since 1993, regularly upgraded and updated.
