= Cosmolabe Rock =

Rock in Antarctica

- Location within South Shetland Islands Location within Antarctica

Geography
- Location: Antarctica
- Coordinates: 62°14′51.2″S 59°09′21.6″W
- Archipelago: South Shetland Islands
- Area: 0.23 ha (0.57 acres)
- Length: 120 m (390 ft)
- Width: 50 m (160 ft)

Administration
- Administered under the Antarctic Treaty

Demographics
- Population: uninhabited

Cosmolabe Rock (Bulgarian: скала Космолабия, romanized: skala Cosmolabe, IPA: [skɐˈla kosmoˈlabija]) is the rock off the NW coast of northwest coast of Nelson Island in the South Shetland Islands, Antarctica extending 120 m in southeast–northwest direction and 50 m wide. Its surface area is 0.23 ha. The vicinity was visited by early 19th century sealers.

The feature is named after the cosmolabe, an instrument created by the French inventor and mathematician Jacques Besson (ca 1540–1573) to be used for navigation, surveying and cartography; in association with other names in the area deriving from the early development or use of geodetic instruments and methods.

== Location ==
Cosmolabe Rock is located at 62°14′51.2″S 59°09′21.6″W, which is 860 m northwest of Retamales Point, 2.7 km northeast of Smilets Point and 1.43 km southwest of Withem Island. British mapping in 1968.

== See also ==
- List of Antarctic and subantarctic islands

== Maps ==
- Livingston Island to King George Island. Scale 1:200000. Admiralty Nautical Chart 1776. Taunton: UK Hydrographic Office, 1968.
- South Shetland Islands. Scale 1:200000 topographic map No. 3373. DOS 610 - W 62 58. Tolworth, UK, 1968.
- Antarctic Digital Database (ADD). Scale 1:250000 topographic map of Antarctica. Scientific Committee on Antarctic Research (SCAR). Since 1993, regularly upgraded and updated.
