= Triznatsi Rocks =

Rocks in Antarctica

- Location within South Shetland Islands Location within Antarctica

Geography
- Location: Antarctica
- Coordinates: 62°15′49″S 59°11′39″W
- Archipelago: South Shetland Islands
- Area: 0.64 ha (1.6 acres)
- Length: 144 m (472 ft)
- Width: 122 m (400 ft)

Administration
- Administered under the Antarctic Treaty

Demographics
- Population: uninhabited

Triznatsi Rocks (Bulgarian: скали Тризнаци, romanized: skali Triznatsi, IPA: [skɐˈli triˈznat͡si]) is the group of three adjacent rocks off the northwest coast of Nelson Island in the South Shetland Islands, Antarctica extending 144 m in west–east direction and 122 m in south–north direction. Their surface areas are 0.33 ha, 0.17 ha and 0.14 ha respectively. The vicinity was visited by early 19th century sealers.

The rocks are so named because of their configuration, 'triznatsi' being the Bulgarian for 'triplets.'

== Location ==
Triznatsi Rocks are centred at 62°15′49″S 59°11′39″W and situated 325 m northwest of Smilets Point, 1.83 km east of Folger Rock and 485 m south-southwest of Meldia Rock. British mapping in 1968.

== See also ==
- List of Antarctic and subantarctic islands

== Maps ==
- Livingston Island to King George Island. Scale 1:200000. Admiralty Nautical Chart 1776. Taunton: UK Hydrographic Office, 1968.
- South Shetland Islands. Scale 1:200000 topographic map No. 3373. DOS 610 - W 62 58. Tolworth, UK, 1968.
- Antarctic Digital Database (ADD). Scale 1:250000 topographic map of Antarctica. Scientific Committee on Antarctic Research (SCAR). Since 1993, regularly upgraded and updated.
