= Rotalia Island =

Island in the South Shetland Islands, Antarctica

- Location of Nelson Island in the South Shetland Islands

- Location within Antarctica Location within Antarctic Peninsula

Geography
- Location: Antarctica
- Coordinates: 62°14′18″S 59°05′24″W
- Archipelago: South Shetland Islands
- Length: 310 m (1020 ft)
- Width: 250 m (820 ft)

Administration
- Antarctica
- Administered under the Antarctic Treaty System

Demographics
- Population: uninhabited

Rotalia Island (Bulgarian: остров Роталия, romanized: ostrov Rotaliya, IPA: [ˈɔstrof roˈtalijɐ]) is the rocky island off the north coast of Nelson Island in the South Shetland Islands, Antarctica extending 310 m in southeast-northwest direction and 250 m in southwest-northeast direction.

The island is “named after the ocean fishing trawler Rotalia of the Bulgarian company Ocean Fisheries – Burgas whose ships operated in the waters of South Georgia, Kerguelen, the South Orkney Islands, South Shetland Islands and Antarctic Peninsula from 1970 to the early 1990s. The Bulgarian fishermen, along with those of the Soviet Union, Poland and East Germany are the pioneers of modern Antarctic fishing industry.”

== Location ==
Rotalia Island is located at 62°14′18″S 59°05′24″W, which is 2.06 km west-southwest of Cariz Point, 530 m north of Meana Point, 1.2 km northeast of Baklan Point and 2.2 km east of Withem Island. British mapping in 1968.

== Maps ==
- South Shetland Islands. Scale 1:200000 topographic map No. 3373. DOS 610 - W 62 58. Tolworth, UK, 1968.
- Antarctic Digital Database (ADD). Scale 1:250000 topographic map of Antarctica. Scientific Committee on Antarctic Research (SCAR). Since 1993, regularly upgraded and updated.
