= Fregata Island =

Island in the South Shetland Islands, Antarctica

- Location of Nelson Island in the South Shetland Islands

- Location within Antarctica Location within Antarctic Peninsula

Geography
- Location: Antarctica
- Coordinates: 62°13′50″S 59°05′54″W
- Archipelago: South Shetland Islands
- Length: 480 m (1570 ft)
- Width: 230 m (750 ft)

Administration
- Antarctica
- Administered under the Antarctic Treaty System

Demographics
- Population: uninhabited

Fregata Island (Bulgarian: остров Фрегата, romanized: ostrov Fregata, IPA: [ˈɔstrof frɛˈɡatɐ]) is the 480 m long in southeast-northwest direction and 230 m wide rocky island lying off the north coast of Nelson Island in the South Shetland Islands, Antarctica.

The island is "named after the ocean fishing trawler Fregata of the Bulgarian company Ocean Fisheries – Burgas whose ships operated in the waters of South Georgia, Kerguelen, the South Orkney Islands, South Shetland Islands and Antarctic Peninsula from 1970 to the early 1990s. The Bulgarian fishermen, along with those of the Soviet Union, Poland and East Germany are the pioneers of modern Antarctic fishing industry."

== Location ==
Fregata Island is located at 62°13′50″S 59°05′54″W, which is 2.29 km west by north of Cariz Point, 1.7 km north-northeast of Baklan Point, 1.93 km east-northeast of Withem Island, 110 m northeast of Kondor Island and 100 m south-southwest of Akin Island. British mapping in 1968.

== Maps ==
- South Shetland Islands. Scale 1:200000 topographic map No. 3373. DOS 610 - W 62 58. Tolworth, UK, 1968.
- Antarctic Digital Database (ADD). Scale 1:250000 topographic map of Antarctica. Scientific Committee on Antarctic Research (SCAR). Since 1993, regularly upgraded and updated.
