= Kondor Island =

Island in the South Shetland Islands, Antarctica

- Location of Nelson Island in the South Shetland Islands

- Location within Antarctica Location within Antarctic Peninsula

Geography
- Location: Antarctica
- Coordinates: 62°13′58.4″S 59°06′02″W
- Archipelago: South Shetland Islands
- Length: 320 m (1050 ft)
- Width: 140 m (460 ft)

Administration
- Administered under the Antarctic Treaty System

Demographics
- Population: Uninhabited

Kondor Island (Bulgarian: остров Кондор, romanized: ostrov Kondor, IPA: [ˈɔstrof konˈdɔr]) is the 320 m long in west–east direction and 140 m wide rocky island lying off the north coast of Nelson Island in the South Shetland Islands, Antarctica.

The island is “named after the ocean fishing trawler Kondor of the Bulgarian company Ocean Fisheries – Burgas whose ships operated in the waters of South Georgia, Kerguelen, the South Orkney Islands, South Shetland Islands and Antarctic Peninsula from 1970 to the early 1990s. The Bulgarian fishermen, along with those of the Soviet Union, Poland and East Germany are the pioneers of modern Antarctic fishing industry.”

== Location ==
Kondor Island is located at 62°13′58.4″S 59°06′02″W, which is 2.45 km west of Cariz Point, 1.41 km north-northeast of Baklan Point, 1.73 km east-northeast of Withem Island and 110 m southwest of Fregata Island. British mapping in 1968.

== Maps ==
- South Shetland Islands. Scale 1:200000 topographic map No. 3373. DOS 610 - W 62 58. Tolworth, UK, 1968.
- Antarctic Digital Database (ADD). Scale 1:250000 topographic map of Antarctica. Scientific Committee on Antarctic Research (SCAR). Since 1993, regularly upgraded and updated.
