= Bulgarian toponyms in Antarctica (C) =

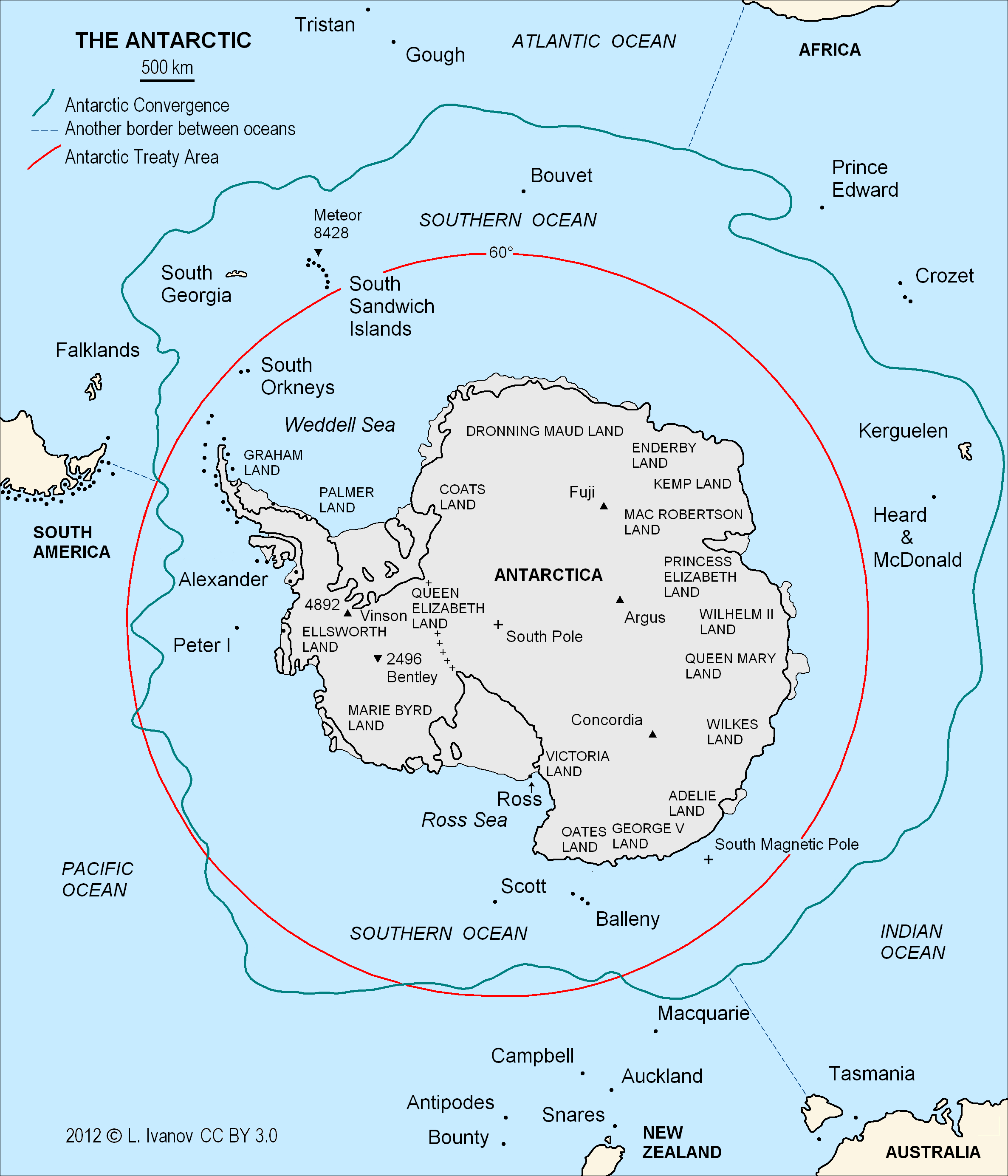
The South Polar Region.

- Cacho Island, Snow Island
- Calliope Beach, Snow Island
- Camp Academia, Livingston Island
- Canetti Peak, Livingston Island
- Casanovas Peak, Livingston Island
- Castellvi Peak, Livingston Island
- Castra Martis Hill, Livingston Island
- Castro Peak, Livingston Island
- Catalunyan Saddle, Livingston Island
- Cavarus Point, Oscar II Coast
- Chakarov Island, Biscoe Islands
- Chakarov Peak, Oscar II Coast
- Chapanov Peak, Oscar II Coast
- Chargan Ridge, Graham Coast
- Charrúa Gap, Livingston Island
- Chavdar Peninsula, Graham Land
- Chavei Cove, Livingston Island
- Chayka Passage, Trinity Island
- Chelopech Hill, Trinity Peninsula
- Chemish Ridge, Foyn Coast
- Chepelare Peak, Livingston Island
- Chepino Saddle, Sentinel Range
- Chepra Cove, Graham Coast
- Cherepish Ridge, Livingston Island
- Cherkovna Point, Graham Coast
- Chernomen Glacier, Graham Coast
- Chernoochene Glacier, Oscar II Coast
- Chernopeev Peak, Trinity Peninsula
- Chertigrad Point, Loubet Coast
- Cherven Peak, Rugged Island
- Chichil Point, Clarence Island
- Chintulov Ridge, Oscar II Coast
- Chipev Nunatak, Nordenskjöld Coast
- Chiprovtsi Point, Rugged Island
- Chiren Heights, Graham Coast
- Chirpan Peak, Livingston Island
- Chochoveni Nunatak, Trinity Peninsula
- Chorobates Rock, Nelson Island
- Chorul Peninsula, Graham Coast
- Christoff Cliff, Livingston Island
- Chubra Peak, Davis Coast
- Chuchuliga Glacier, Oscar II Coast
- Chudomir Cove, Trinity Peninsula
- Chukovezer Island, Anvers Island
- Chumerna Glacier, Brabant Island
- Chuprene Glacier, Smith Island
- Churicheni Island, Robert Island
- Chuypetlovo Knoll, Foyn Coast
- Clio Bay, Lavoisier Island
- Coburg Peak, Trinity Peninsula
- Cosmolabe Rock, Nelson Island
- Crates Bay, Graham Coast

== See also ==
- Bulgarian toponyms in Antarctica

== Bibliography ==
- J. Stewart. Antarctica: An Encyclopedia. Jefferson, N.C. and London: McFarland, 2011. 1771 pp. ISBN 978-0-7864-3590-6
- L. Ivanov. Bulgarian Names in Antarctica. Sofia: Manfred Wörner Foundation, 2021. Second edition. 539 pp. ISBN 978-619-90008-5-4 (in Bulgarian)
- G. Bakardzhieva. Bulgarian toponyms in Antarctica. Paisiy Hilendarski University of Plovdiv: Research Papers. Vol. 56, Book 1, Part A, 2018 – Languages and Literature, pp. 104-119 (in Bulgarian)
- L. Ivanov and N. Ivanova. Bulgarian names. In: The World of Antarctica. Generis Publishing, 2022. pp. 114-115. ISBN 979-8-88676-403-1
