= Weeks Stack =

Island in the South Shetland Islands

Location of Nelson Island in the South Shetland Islands.

Weeks Stack (62°13′38.1″S 59°2′44.5″W) is a sea stack lying off the north tip of Nelson Island in the northern approach to Fildes Strait, in the South Shetland Islands. Situated 635 m north-northeast of Cariz (Agrelo) Point. Named by the United Kingdom Antarctic Place-Names Committee (UK-APC) in 1961 for Captain Weeks, Master of the British sealing vessel Horatio from London, who visited the South Shetland Islands in 1820–21.
