= Lambreva Beach =

Antarctic beach

Location of Nelson Island in the South Shetland Islands

Lambreva Beach (Bulgarian: бряг Ламбрева, romanized: bryag Lambreva, IPA: [ˈbrʲak ˈɫambrevɐ]) is the mostly ice-free 1.3 km long beach on the northwest coast of Nelson Island in the South Shetland Islands, Antarctica, extending southwest of Smilets Point and northeast of Sabin Point. Its surface area is 17 ha. The area was visited by early 19th century sealers.

The beach is named after Anka Lambreva (1895-1976), nurse, writer and lecturer, the first Bulgarian woman who circumnavigated the globe.

== Location ==
Lambreva Beach is centred at 62°16′18″S 59°11′23″W. British mapping of the area in 1968.

== Maps ==
- Livingston Island to King George Island. Scale 1:200000. Admiralty Nautical Chart 1776. Taunton: UK Hydrographic Office, 1968
- South Shetland Islands. Scale 1:200000 topographic map No. 3373. DOS 610 - W 62 58. Tolworth, UK, 1968
- Antarctic Digital Database (ADD). Scale 1:250000 topographic map of Antarctica. Scientific Committee on Antarctic Research (SCAR). Since 1993, regularly upgraded and updated
