= Ross Point =

Location of Nelson Island in the South Shetland Islands.

Ross Point (62°20′54″S 59°07′09″W) is a point forming the southeast side of the entrance to Varvara Cove on the southwest side of Nelson Island in the South Shetland Islands, situated 7.85 km southeast of Harmony Point. The point was charted by DI personnel on the Discovery II in 1935.
