= Meldia Rock =

Rock in Antarctica

- Location of Nelson Island in the South Shetland Islands

- Location within Antarctica Location within Antarctic Peninsula

Geography
- Location: Antarctica
- Coordinates: 62°15′28.7″S 59°11′21″W
- Archipelago: South Shetland Islands

Administration
- Administered under the Antarctic Treaty System

Demographics
- Population: Uninhabited

Meldia Rock (Bulgarian: скала Мелдия, ‘Skala Meldia’ \ska-'la 'mel-di-ya\) is the rock of diameter 220 m and split in east-west direction, lying off the northwest coast of Nelson Island in the South Shetland Islands, Antarctica. The area was visited by early 19th century sealers.

The rock is named after the ancient Roman station of Meldia in Western Bulgaria.

== Location ==
Meldia Rock is located at 62°15′28.7″S 59°11′21″W, which is 800 m north of Smilets Point, 2.2 km east-northeast of Folger Rock, 3.37 km southwest of Withem Island and 2.43 km west-southwest of Retamales Point. British mapping in 1968.

== See also ==
- List of Antarctic and subantarctic islands

== Maps ==
- Livingston Island to King George Island. Scale 1:200000. Admiralty Nautical Chart 1776. Taunton: UK Hydrographic Office, 1968.
- South Shetland Islands. Scale 1:200000 topographic map No. 3373. DOS 610 - W 62 58. Tolworth, UK, 1968.
- Antarctic Digital Database (ADD). Scale 1:250000 topographic map of Antarctica. Scientific Committee on Antarctic Research (SCAR). Since 1993, regularly upgraded and updated.
