= Geographers Cove =

Geographers Cove (62°13′02″S 59°01′05″W) is a cove between Flat Top Peninsula and Exotic Point on the southwest side of Fildes Peninsula, King George Island, in the South Shetland Islands. The approved name is a translation of the Russian "Bukhta Geografov" (geographers' bay), applied in 1968 following Soviet Antarctic Expedition surveys from nearby Bellingshausen Station.
