= Upton Rock =

Rock in the South Shetland Islands

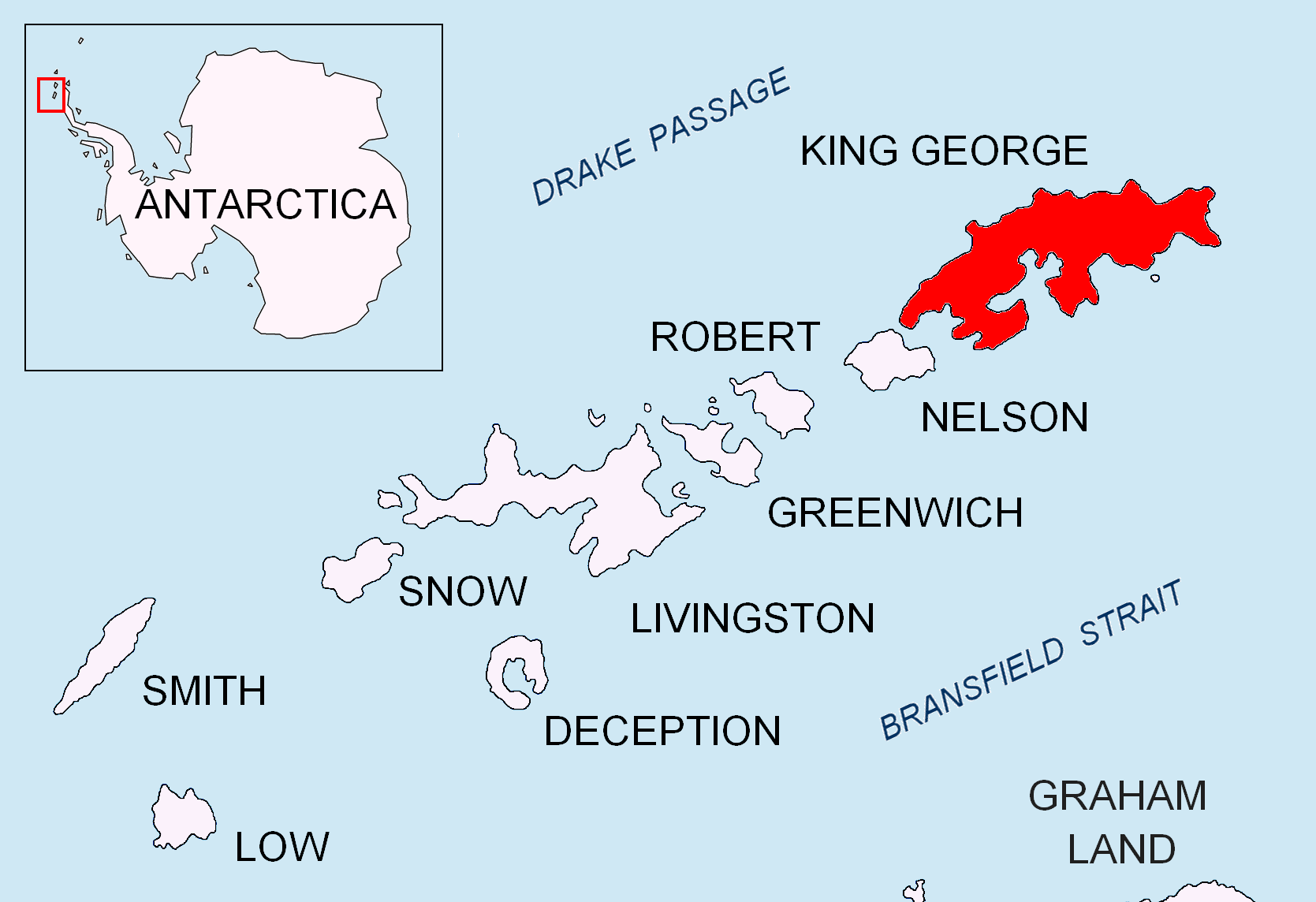
Location of King George Island in the South Shetland Islands.

Upton Rock (62°11′43″S 59°07′23″W) is a rock in the South Shetland Islands, located 3 nautical miles (6 km) northwest of Flat Top Peninsula, King George Island. The rock was named in 1961 by the United Kingdom Antarctic Place-Names Committee (UK-APC) for Benjamin Upton, who captained the American sailing vessel Nancy, namesake of Nancy Rock, from Salem, Massachusetts, during its visit to the South Shetland Islands around 1820–22.
