= Agrelo =

Agrelo or Agrelos is a surname. It may refer to:

== In places ==
- Agrelo, Lujan de Cuyo, Mendoza province, Argentina, an area famous for its wine
- Agrelo Point or Cariz Point, the rocky north extremity of Nelson Island in the South Shetland Islands, Antarctica

== In people ==
- Ana Isabel Boullón Agrelo (born 1962), Galician linguist
- Marilyn Agrelo, American film director and producer
- Gonçalo Agrelos, (born 1998), sometimes known as Salo, Portuguese footballer
