= Tribrach =

Tribrach can refer to:

- Tribrach (poetry), a metrical foot of three short syllables.
- Tribrach (instrument), a device used in surveying for mounting an instrument on a surveyor's tripod.
