= Bris (disambiguation) =

A bris is a Jewish male circumcision ceremony.

Bris may also refer to:

- "The Bris", a 1993 Seinfeld episode
- Bris Roar, short name for the Brisbane Roar FC football team
- Bris Sextant, a small angle measuring device
