= Guangzhou (disambiguation) =

Guangzhou is a city in China's Guangdong Province.

Guangzhou may also refer to:

- Guǎng Prefecture (廣州), a historical prefecture in modern Guangdong, Hong Kong, and Macau, China
- Guāng Prefecture (光州), a historical prefecture in modern Henan and Anhui, China
- 3048 Guangzhou, a main-belt asteroid
- COSCO Guangzhou, a container ship
- Guangzhou dialect, another name for Cantonese, particularly as spoken in Guangzhou
- Guangzhou F.C., a professional football club in Guangzhou, Guangdong, China
- Guangzhou Peninsula, a headland in Antarctica

== See also ==
- Gwangju (disambiguation), Korean Hanja reading of "Guangzhou"
- Canton (disambiguation)
