= Varvara Cove =

Cove in the South Shetland Islands, Antarctica

Location of Nelson Island in the South Shetland Islands.

Varvara Cove (Bulgarian: залив Варвара, romanized: zaliv Varvara, IPA: [ˈzaliv vɐrˈvarɐ]) is the 3.3 km wide cove indenting for 1.9 km the southwest coast of Nelson Island in the South Shetland Islands, Antarctica. Entered southeast of The Toe and northwest of Ross Point.

The cove is named after the settlement of Varvara in southeastern Bulgaria.

== Location ==
Varvara Cove is centred at 62°20′10″S 59°08′00″W. British mapping in 1968.

== Maps ==
- South Shetland Islands. Scale 1:200000 topographic map No. 3373. DOS 610 - W 62 58. Tolworth, UK, 1968.
- Antarctic Digital Database (ADD). Scale 1:250000 topographic map of Antarctica. Scientific Committee on Antarctic Research (SCAR). Since 1993, regularly upgraded and updated.
