= Guangzhou Peninsula =

Antarctic peninsula

Location of Nelson Island in the South Shetland Islands and Antarctica

Guangzhou Peninsula is the mostly ice-free peninsula forming the west extremity of Nelson Island in the South Shetland Islands, Antarctica and ending up in Harmony Point. It is bounded by Harmony Cove and Nelson Strait on the south and southwest, and Malak Sechko Cove and Golyam Sechko Cove in Drake Passage on the northwest, extends 3.4 km in northeast–southwest direction and 2.7 km in southeast–northwest direction, and has a surface area of 5.02 km^{2}. The area was visited by early 19th century sealers based at Harmony Cove.

Guangzhou Peninsula is part of both the Antarctic Specially Protected Area Harmony Point (ASPA 133) and the BirdLife International Important Bird Area Harmony Point, Nelson Island. The Argentine refuge Gurruchaga, set up on the peninsula's south coast in 1953, is used by summer field parties carrying out research in the area. A Chilean navigation radio beacon is mounted at the westernmost extremity of Harmony Point.

The feature is named after the Chinese city of Guangzhou, then a major sealing hub along with London and New York for the nineteenth-century sealing industry of Antarctica, in association with other related names in the area.

== Location ==
Guangzhou Peninsula is centred at 62°17′50″S 59°12′25″W. British mapping of the area in 1822, 1968 and 2009, Argentine in 1957 and 1980, Chilean in 1971 and Uruguayan in 1986.

== Maps ==
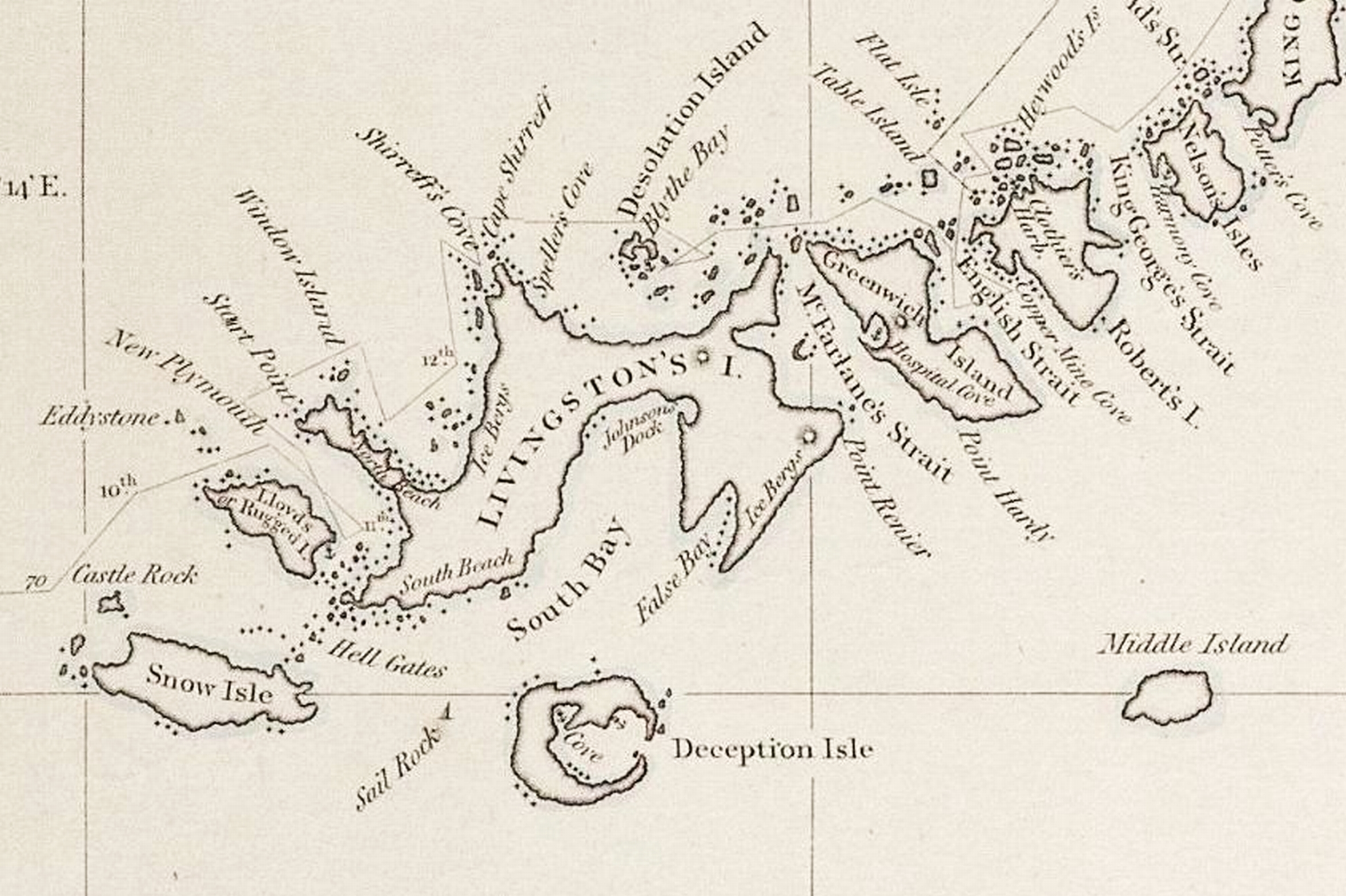
Nelson Island and Guangzhou Peninsula on George Powell's 1822 chart; the track is that of his sloop Dove in November 1821

- Chart of South Shetland including Coronation Island, &c. from the exploration of the sloop Dove in the years 1821 and 1822 by George Powell Commander of the same. Scale ca. 1:200000. London: Laurie, 1822
- Nelson Island: Harmony Cove. Scale 1:25000. Argentine Government Plan, 1957; with additions by HMS Endurance, 1975
- Livingston Island to King George Island. Scale 1:200000. Admiralty Nautical Chart 1776. Taunton: UK Hydrographic Office, 1968
- South Shetland Islands. Scale 1:200000 topographic map No. 3373. DOS 610 - W 62 58. Tolworth, UK, 1968
- Isla Elefante a Isla Trinidad. Mapa hidrográfico a escala 1:500000 / 1:350000. Valparaíso: Instituto Hidrográfico de la Armada de Chile, 1971
- Islas Shetland del Sur de Isla 25 de Mayo a Isla Livingston. Mapa hidrográfico a escala 1:200000. Buenos Aires: Servicio de Hidrografía Naval de la Armada, 1980
- Isla Nelson - Punta Armonía. Shetland del Sur. Escala 1:5000. Servicio Geográfico Militar del Uruguay, 1986
- South Shetland Islands: Greenwich, Robert and Nelson Islands. Scale 1:100000. UK Antarctic Place-names Committee, 2009
- Antarctic Digital Database (ADD). Scale 1:250000 topographic map of Antarctica. Scientific Committee on Antarctic Research (SCAR). Since 1993, regularly upgraded and updated
