= List of surveying instruments =

Instruments used in surveying include:

- Alidade
- Alidade table
- Cosmolabe
- Dioptra
- Dumpy level
- Engineer's chain
- Geodimeter
- Graphometer
- Groma (surveying)
- Laser scanning
- Level
- Level staff
- Measuring tape
- Plane table
- Pole (surveying)
- Prism (surveying) (corner cube retroreflector)
- Prismatic compass (angle measurement)
- Ramsden surveying instruments
- Ranging rod
- Surveyor's chain
- Surveyor's compass
- Tachymeter (surveying)
- Tape (surveying)
- Tellurometer
- Theodolite
  - Half theodolite
  - Plain theodolite
  - Simple theodolite
  - Great theodolite
  - Non-transit theodolite
  - Transit theodolite
  - Seconds theodolite
  - Electronic theodolite
  - Mining theodolite
  - Suspension theodolite
  - Traveling theodolite
  - Pibal theodolite
  - Registering theodolite
  - Gyro-theodolite
  - Construction theodolite
  - Photo-theodolite
  - Robotic theodolite
  - Vernier theodolite
- Total station
- Transit (surveying)
- Tripod (surveying)
- Universal instrument (surveying)

== See also ==
- Astronomical instrument
- Measurement instrument
