= Argonavt Cove =

Location of Nelson Island in the South Shetland Islands

Argonavt Cove (Bulgarian: залив Аргонавт, ‘Zaliv Argonavt’ \'za-liv ar-go-'navt\) is the 1.85 km wide cove indenting for 950 m the north coast of Nelson Island in the South Shetland Islands, Antarctica. It is entered east of Retamales Point and west of Baklan Point.

The cove is named after the ocean fishing trawler Agonavt of the Bulgarian company Ocean Fisheries – Burgas that operated in Antarctic waters off South Georgia and the South Orkney Islands during its fishing trip under Captain Kosyo Angelov from December 1978 to July 1979. A designated onboard team of marine biologists undertook fisheries research in the process. The Bulgarian fishermen, along with those of the Soviet Union, Poland and East Germany are the pioneers of modern Antarctic fishing industry.

== Location ==
Argonavt Cove is centred at 62°15′10″S 59°07′25″W. British mapping in 1968.

== Maps ==
- South Shetland Islands. Scale 1:200000 topographic map No. 3373. DOS 610 - W 62 58. Tolworth, UK, 1968.
- Antarctic Digital Database (ADD). Scale 1:250000 topographic map of Antarctica. Scientific Committee on Antarctic Research (SCAR). Since 1993, regularly upgraded and updated.
