= Philosopher of the Sea =

- Original title: Havsfilosofen
- Directed by: Andreas Eidhagen
- Produced by: Annika Gritti
- Starring: Sven Yrvind; Thomas Grahn; Beppe Backlund; Håkan Johansson; Janneke R. Schokker
- Cinematography: Claes Helander
- Edited by: Andreas Eidhagen
- Music by: Sofia Hallgren
- Production company: The Motor Moving Pictures
- Distributed by: Viaplay
- Release date: March 17, 2023
- Running time: 78 minutes
- Country: Sweden
- Languages: Swedish; English
- Budget: 340 000 €

Philosopher of the Sea is a 2023 Swedish documentary film directed by Andreas Eidhagen and produced by Annika Gritti. The film explores the adventure and the inner journey of Sven Yrvind, an 80 year old sailing enthusiast, who builds a minimalistic sailboat with the intention of sailing non-stop from Ireland to New Zealand.

== Plot ==
The film revolves around Sven Yrvind and his ambitious project to build an extremely small sailboat and challenge the seas by sailing from Ireland to New Zealand without stopping.

== Production and distribution ==
Philosopher of the sea premiered on March 17, 2023 in Sweden. The film was produced by the Motor Moving Pictures and was released at Viaplay running for 78 minutes.

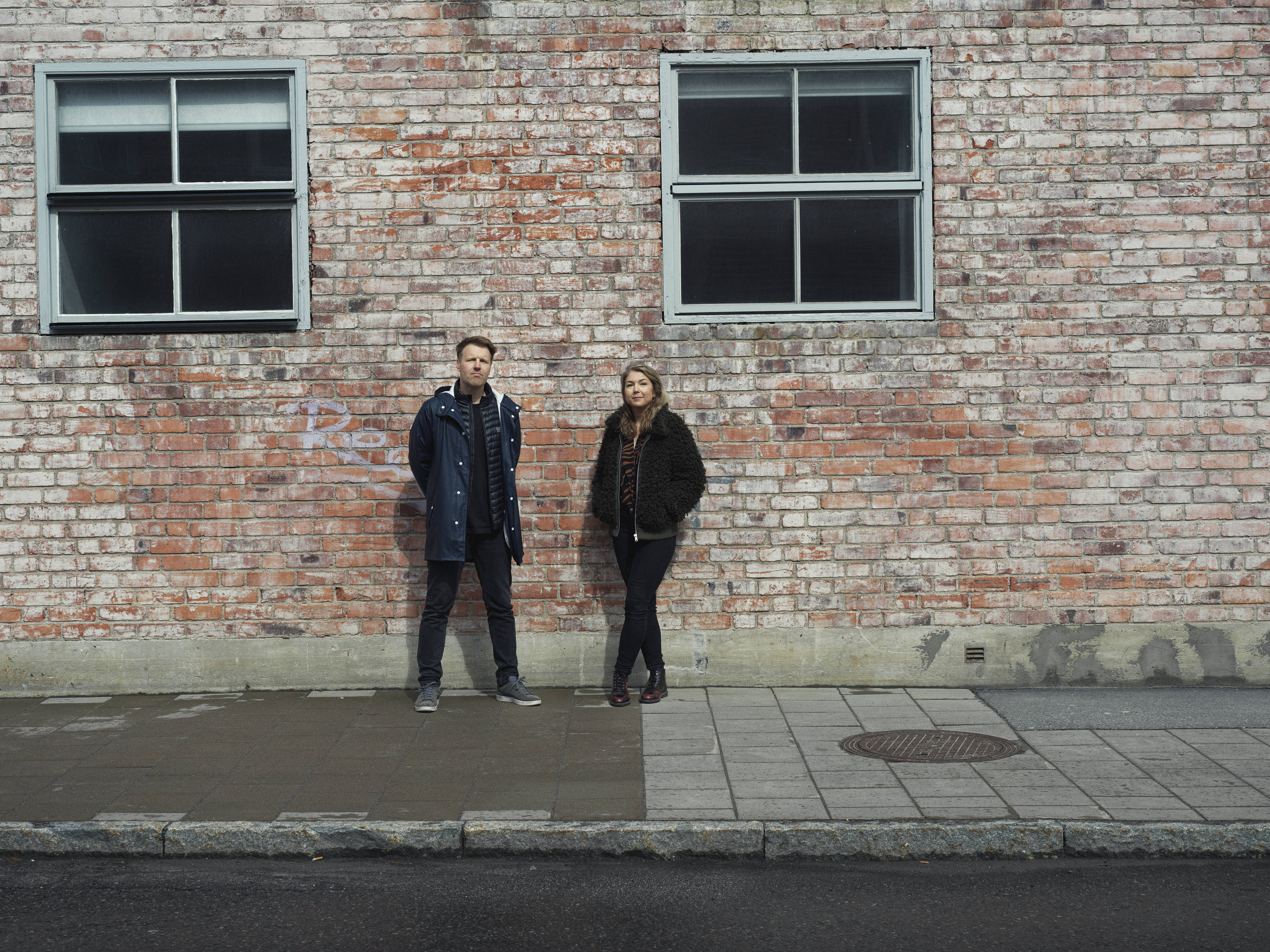
Director Andreas Eidhagen and producer Annika Gritti at The Motor Moving Pictures AB.

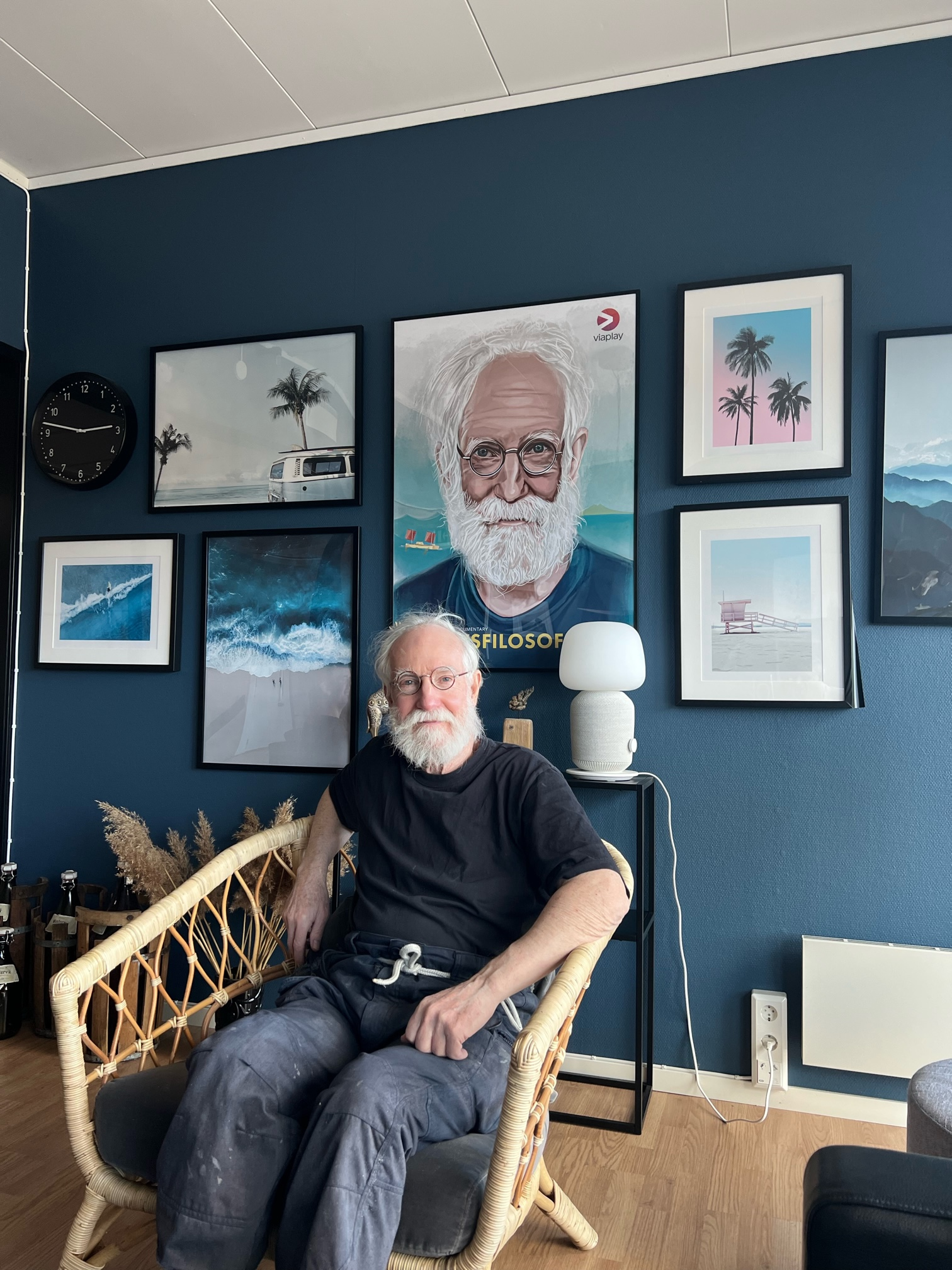
Sven Yrvind sitting beneath the film poster for Philosopher of the Sea.

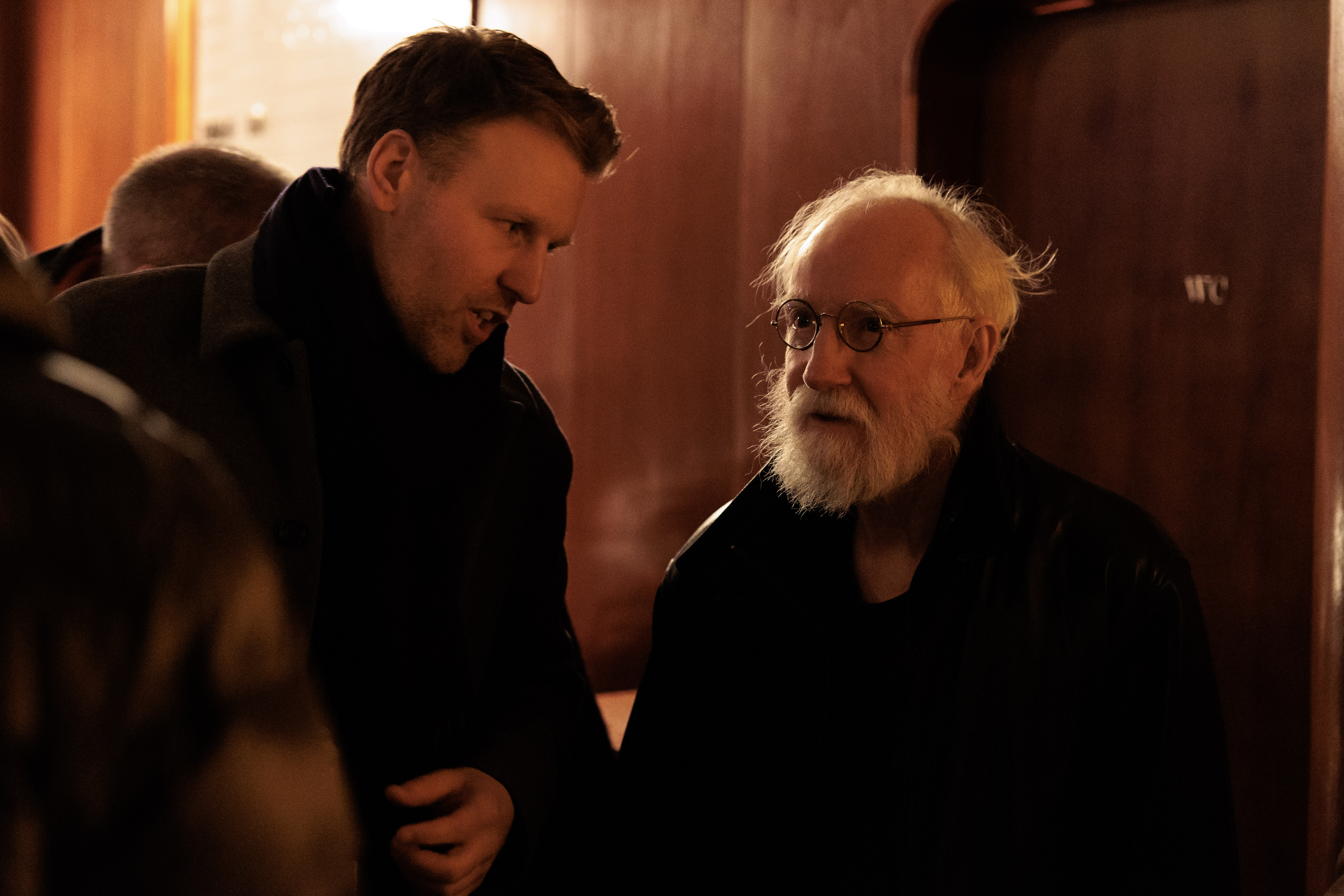
Andreas Eidhagen and Sven Yrvind at the premiere of Philosopher of the Sea.

== Awards ==
List of awards and nominations received by Philosopher of the Sea
Award	Year	Category	Receiver	Results	Ref.
The Crystal	2023	Documentary program of the year	Philosopher of the Sea	Nominated	
Stockholm City Film Festival	2023	Best Feature Documentary	Philosopher of the Sea	Won	
Tokyo Lift-Off Film Festival	2023	Best Feature Documentary	Philosopher of the Sea	Nominated	
Toronto Lift-Off Film Festival	2023	Best Feature Documentary	Philosopher of the Sea	Won	
Scandinavian International Film Awards	2023	Outstanding Achievement	Andreas Eidhagen	Won	
