= Hall Cove =

Cove in the South Shetland Islands, Antarctica

Location of Nelson Island in the South Shetland Islands.

Hall Cove (Bulgarian: залив Хол, romanized: Zaliv Hall \'za-liv 'hol\) is the 2.85 km wide cove indenting for 1 km the northwest coast of Nelson Island in the South Shetland Islands, Antarctica. Entered northeast of Smilets Point and southwest of Retamales Point. The area was visited by early 19th century sealers.

The cove is named after John Hall of the British Antarctic Survey, for his support for the Bulgarian Antarctic programme.

== Location ==
Hall Cove is centred at 62°15′45″S 59°09′40″W. British mapping in 1968.

== Maps ==
- Livingston Island to King George Island. Scale 1:200000. Admiralty Nautical Chart 1776. Taunton: UK Hydrographic Office, 1968.
- South Shetland Islands. Scale 1:200000 topographic map No. 3373. DOS 610 - W 62 58. Tolworth, UK, 1968.
- Antarctic Digital Database (ADD). Scale 1:250000 topographic map of Antarctica. Scientific Committee on Antarctic Research (SCAR). Since 1993, regularly upgraded and updated.
