= Malak Sechko Cove =

Antarctic cove

Location of Nelson Island in the South Shetland Islands

Malak Sechko Cove (Bulgarian: залив Малък Сечко, romanized: zaliv Malak Sechko, IPA: [ˈzalif ˈmalɤk ˈset͡ʃko]) is the 1.8 km wide cove indenting for 760 m the northwest coast of Guangzhou Peninsula on Nelson Island in the South Shetland Islands, Antarctica north of Harmony Point. The area was visited by early 19th century sealers.

The feature is named after the Bulgarian mythical figure Malak (little) Sechko associated with winter and cold, in relation to working in the harsh Antarctic environment.

== Location ==
Malak Sechko Cove is centred at 62°17′50″S 59°13′50″W. British mapping of the area in 1968.

== Maps ==
- Livingston Island to King George Island. Scale 1:200000. Admiralty Nautical Chart 1776. Taunton: UK Hydrographic Office, 1968
- South Shetland Islands. Scale 1:200000 topographic map No. 3373. DOS 610 - W 62 58. Tolworth, UK, 1968
- Isla Nelson - Punta Armonía. Shetland del Sur. Escala 1:5000. Servicio Geográfico Militar del Uruguay, 1986
- Antarctic Digital Database (ADD). Scale 1:250000 topographic map of Antarctica. Scientific Committee on Antarctic Research (SCAR). Since 1993, regularly upgraded and updated
