= Spiro Hill =

Geographical feature in Antarctica

Location of Nelson Island in the South Shetland Islands.

Spiro Hill (62°16′S 59°0′W) is a hill, 120 m, lying at the head of Edgell Bay, Nelson Island, in the South Shetland Islands.

The present toponym replaces the provisional "Sudeste" and was approved by the Geographic Coordinating Committee of Argentina in 1956. It memorializes the mariner of Greek origin, Spiro, who was in the squadron of Admiral Brown and died valiantly by exploding the ship's magazine before its surrender to the enemy.
