= Meana Point =

Antarctic headland

Location of Nelson Island in the South Shetland Islands.

Meana Point (Bulgarian: нос Меана, romanized: nos Meana, IPA: [ˈnɔs mɛˈanɐ]) is the ice covered west entrance point of Quesada Cove on the north coast of Nelson Island in the South Shetland Islands, Antarctica. It is formed as a result of the retreat of Nelson Island's ice cap in the last decade of 20th century. The area was visited by early 19th century sealers.

The feature is named after Elias Meana Díaz, member of the Spanish team that built Juan Carlos I base in January 1988 and first commander of that base during the 1988/89 austral summer season, for his support for the Bulgarian Antarctic programme.

== Location ==
Meana Point is located at 62°14′39.5″S 59°05′27″W, which is 1 km east of Baklan Point, 530 m south of Rotalia Island and 2.5 km southwest of Cariz Point. British mapping of the area in 1968.

== Maps ==
- Livingston Island to King George Island. Scale 1:200000. Admiralty Nautical Chart 1776. Taunton: UK Hydrographic Office, 1968
- South Shetland Islands. Scale 1:200000 topographic map No. 3373. DOS 610 - W 62 58. Tolworth, UK, 1968
- Antarctic Digital Database (ADD). Scale 1:250000 topographic map of Antarctica. Scientific Committee on Antarctic Research (SCAR). Since 1993, regularly upgraded and updated
