= List of astronomical instruments =

Devices for observing, measuring or recording astronomical data

An astronomical instrument is a device for observing, measuring or recording astronomical data. They are used in the scientific field of astronomy, a natural science that studies celestial objects and the phenomena that occur in the cosmos, with the object of explaining their origin and evolution over time. Many are also used in navigation and surveying.

Astronomical instruments include:

- Alidade: device that allows one to sight a distant object
- Armillary sphere: model of objects in the sky consisting of a framework of rings
- Astrarium: timepiece and astronomical prediction device
- Astrolabe: astronomical instrument
- Astronomical clock: clock displaying astronomical information
- Antikythera mechanism: ancient Greek analogue astronomical computer
- Blink comparator: astronomy viewing apparatus
- Bolometer: device for measuring incident electromagnetic radiation
- Canterbury Astrolabe Quadrant: medieval astrolabe found in England
- Celatone: navigational aid reliant on tracking Jupiter's moons in the sky
- Celestial sphere: conceptual tool in astronomy
- Charge-coupled device: digital imaging circuit since 1970
- Computers: programmable machine that processes data
- CMOS sensor: image sensor, consisting of an integrated circuit
- Coronagraph: telescopic attachment designed to block out the direct light from a star
- Cosmolabe: ancient astronomical instrument
- Dioptra: classical surveying instrument from the 3rd century BCE
- Equatorial ring: instrument to determine the moment of the equinoxes
- Equatorium: astronomical calculating instrument
- Gnomon: part of a sundial that casts a shadow
- Inclinometer: instrument used to measure the inclination of a surface relative to local gravity
- Interferometer: instrument which measures the interference of superimposed waves
- Kamal: celestial navigation device that determines latitude
- Meridian circle: astronomical instrument for timing of the passage of stars
- Microchannel plate detector: detection single parties and photons
- Mural instrument: type of angle measuring device
- Nebra sky disk: bronze artefact, c. 1600 BC, found in Nebra, Germany
- Nocturnal: astronomical tool to determine local time
- Octant: measuring instrument used primarily in navigation; type of reflecting instrument
- Optical spectrometer, also known as Spectrograph: instrument to measure the properties of visible light
- Orrery: mechanical model of the Solar System
- Photographic plate: target medium in photography
- Photometer: instrument to measure light intensity
- Planisphere: class of star chart
- Prague astronomical clock: medieval astronomical clock in the Czech Republic
- Quadrant: navigation instrument
- Reticle: aim markings in optical devices, e.g. crosshairs
- Retroreflector: device to reflect radiation back to its source
- Scaphe: sundial said to have been invented by Aristarchus
- Sextant: measuring instrument in Astronomy
- Starshade: proposed occulter
- Space telescope: instrument in space to study astronomical objects
- Spectrometers: used to measure spectral components of light
- Sundial: time-telling device
- Transit instrument: small telescope used for precise astrometry
- Telescope: instrument that makes distant objects appear magnified
- Torquetum: medieval astronomical instrument
- Triquetrum: ancient astronomical instrument
- Volvelle: paper construct with rotating parts
- Zenith telescope: type of telescope that points straight up

== See also ==
- Astronomy
- Outline of astronomy
- Surveying instrument
- Measurement instrument
