= Tripod (surveying) =

Surveying device

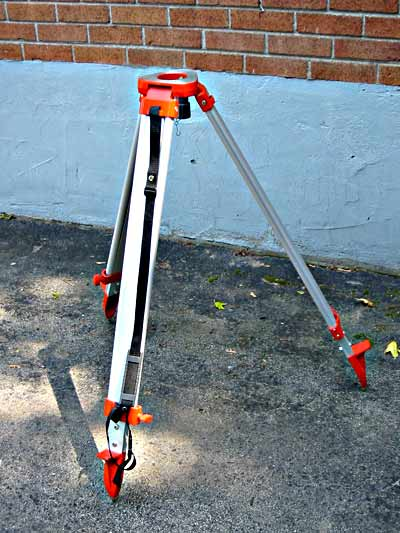
A surveyor's tripod with a shoulder strap. The head of the tripod supports the instrument while the feet are spiked to anchor the tripod to the ground.

A surveyor's tripod is a device used to support any one of a number of surveying instruments, such as theodolites, total stations, levels or transits.

== History ==
The modern sturdy, but portable, tripod stand with three leg pairs hinged to a triangular metal head was invented and first manufactured for sale by Sir Francis Ronalds in the late 1820s in Croydon. He sold 140 of the stands in the decade 1830-40 and his design was soon imitated by others.

Older surveying tripods had slightly different features compared to modern ones. For example, on some older tripods, the instrument had its own footplate and did not need to move laterally relative to the tripod head. For this reason, the head of the tripod was not a flat footplate but was simply a large diameter fitting. Threads on the outside of the head engaged threads on the instrument's footplate. No other mounting screw was used.

Fixed length legs were also seen on older instruments. Instrument height was adjusted by changing the angle of the legs. Widely spaced tripod feet resulted in a lower instrument while closely spaced legs raised the instrument. This was considerably less convenient than having variable length legs.

Materials for older tripods were predominantly wood and brass, with some steel for high wear items like the feet or foot points.

== Usage ==
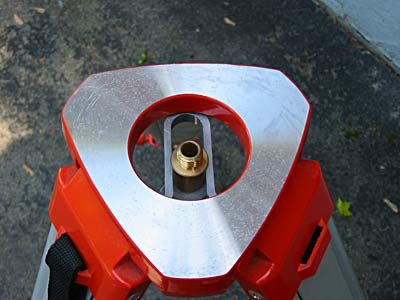
This shows the head of a surveyor's tripod with the hollow mounting screw in the opening.

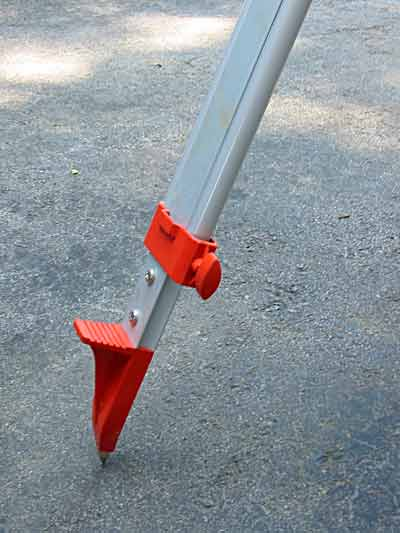
This shows a surveyor's tripod's foot. The platform is used to push the spike into the ground. Above the foot is the height adjustment.

The tripod is placed in the location where it is needed. The surveyor will press down on the legs' platforms to securely anchor the legs in soil or to force the feet to a low position on uneven, pock-marked pavement. Leg lengths are adjusted to bring the tripod head to a convenient height and make it roughly level.

Once the tripod is positioned and secure, the instrument is placed on the head. The mounting screw is pushed up under the instrument to engage the instrument's base and screwed tight when the instrument is in the correct position. The flat surface of the tripod head is called the foot plate and is used to support the adjustable feet of the instrument.

Positioning the tripod and instrument precisely over an indicated mark on the ground or benchmark requires intricate techniques.

== Construction ==
Many modern tripods are constructed of aluminum, though wood is still used for legs. The feet are either aluminum tipped with a steel point or steel. The mounting screw is often brass or brass and plastic. The mounting screw is hollow and has two lateral holes to attach a plumb bob to center the instrument e.g. over a corner or other mark on the ground. After the instrument is centered within a few cm over the mark, the plumb bob is removed and a viewer (using a prism) in the instrument is used to exactly center it.

The top is typically threaded with a 5/8" x 11 tpi screw thread. The mounting screw is held to the underside of the tripod head by a movable arm. This permits the screw to be moved anywhere within the head's opening. The legs are attached to the head with adjustable screws that are usually kept tight enough to allow the legs to be moved with a bit of resistance. The legs are two part, with the lower part capable of telescoping to adjust the length of the leg to suit the terrain. Aluminum or steel slip joints with a tightening screw are at the bottom of the upper leg to hold the bottom part in place and fix the length. A shoulder strap is often affixed to the tripod to allow for ease of carrying the equipment over areas to be surveyed.

== See also ==
- Tribrach (instrument)
