= Gwangju (disambiguation) =

Gwangju, fully Jeonnam–Gwangju Special Metropolitan City, is a provincial-level city in South Korea.

It may also refer to:

- Gwangju, a former metropolitan city in South Korea
- Gwangju, Gyeonggi, a small city in Gyeonggi-do, South Korea
- Guangzhou, China, in Korean contexts

== See also ==
- Guangzhou (disambiguation), its Chinese equivalent
