= Eco-Nelson =

CZ*ECO-Nelson
- Location within Antarctica

General information
- Location: Nelson Island, South Shetland Islands, British Antarctic Territory
- Coordinates: 62°14′46″S 58°58′57″W
- Construction started: December 1988

CZ*ECO Nelson, also known as ECO Nelson to 2018 or Nelson Structures according to the ATS, is an Antarctic station on Nelson Island in the South Shetland Islands in Antarctica. The station was founded by the Czech explorer and writer Jaroslav Pavlíček in December 1988 and was the only private station in Antarctica for 30 years until its founder donated it to the Czech Antarctic Foundation (ČANF) in October 2017.

The station is now operated by Masaryk University in Brno as part of the Czech Antarctic Research Programme. In 1988, the university leased the station for 99 years, with a plan to implement scientific activities. Staying at the station requires permission.

== Location ==
The station is located on Nelson Island in the South Shetland Islands, which is very close to King George Island, where there are several other polar stations and the Teniente Rodolfo Marsh Martin Airport. During the southern summer season, King George Island can be reached by air from Punta Arenas.

The station is located in a rocky 4 km^{2} ice-free oasis with vegetation at the northern tip of the island. The base is located about 150 m from the shore, which consists of a sandy and rocky beach, and there is a safe anchorage nearby.

The climate is typically oceanic, with temperatures of around 0 °C in the summer and below freezing in the winter, and relative humidity of around 90% with almost constant precipitation in the form of drizzle, rain or snow, totaling 500 mm annually. About 40 cm of snow covers the oasis during the winter.

== History ==
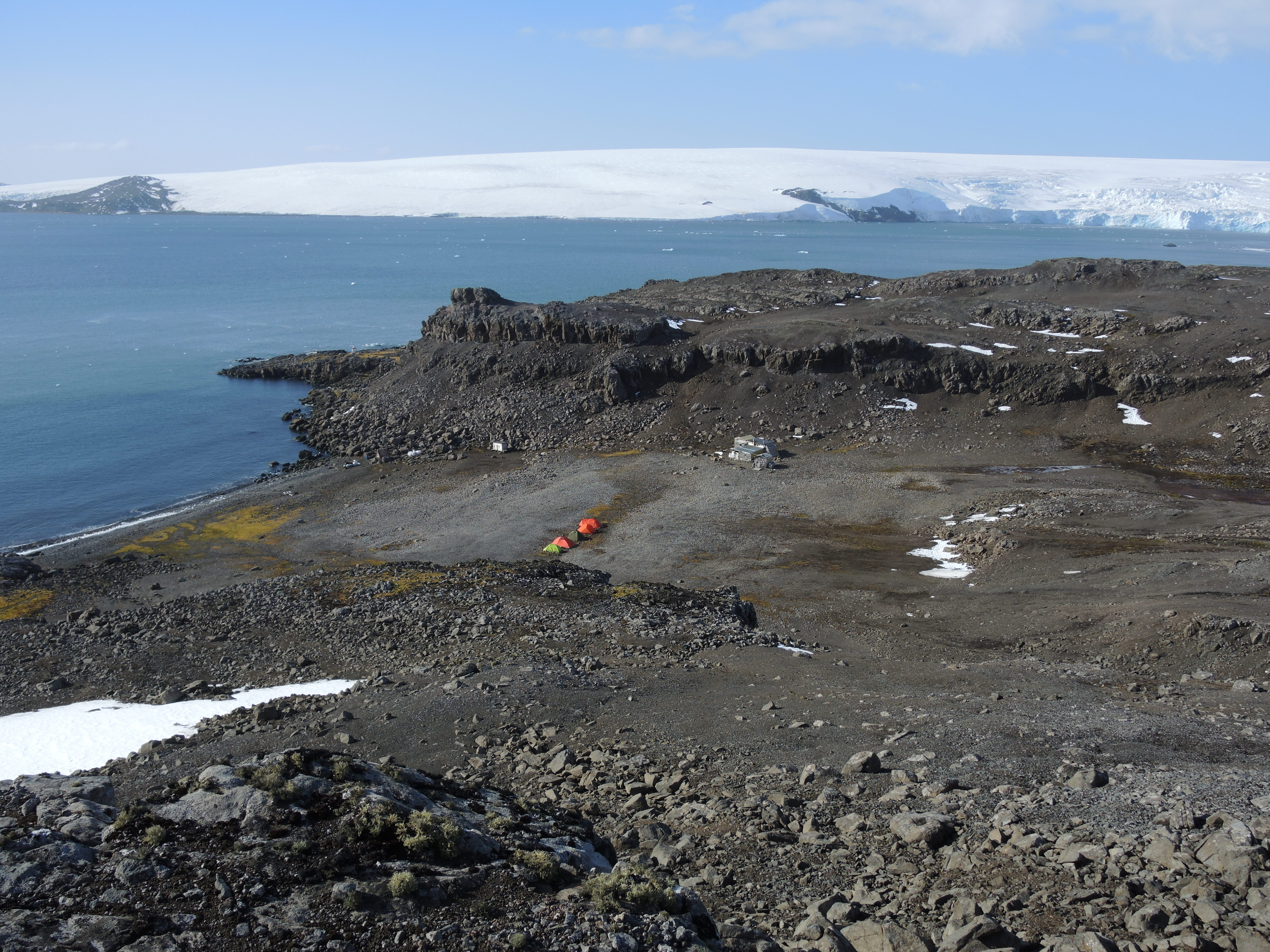
CZ*ECO-Nelson Station, February 2019. On the sea terrace in front of the station, there is a temporary tent camp where the expedition of Masaryk University and the Czech Antarctic Foundation stayed during the general cleaning, which was the first step to enable the reconstruction.

Between January and March 1987, Czech explorers Jaroslav Pavlíček and Jan Pávek searched for a suitable location to establish a station. It was found on another expedition between December 1988 and February 1989 by Pavlíček with Jaroslav Fous, Miroslav Jakeš, algologist Jiří Komárek, Zdeněk Zamazal and Martin Kříž. Zamazal and Kříž tried to stay over the winter until May 1989. From December 1989 to February 1990, Petr Šlambora and Lubomír Kováčik worked at the station. In 1990, Jaroslav Fous and Lubomír Kováčik carried out the first winter-over. In the first half of the 1990s, ornithologists Petr Lumpe and Karel Weidinger, Mojmír Martínek, Martin Mykiska and Lubomír Ančinec influenced the program at the station.

The station consisted of several small buildings constructed from various materials, with stone foundations, on which stood barracks with wooden walls filled with insulating material and lined with asbestos-free eternit, also used on most roofs.

Pavlíček allowed the wider public to stay as part of research into survival and an ecological lifestyle. The station could accommodate up to 12 people. Visitors were not ordinary tourists, they had to work during their stay and complete a three-day survival course. The volunteers paid for their stay and were not paid for their work.

Notable figures hosted by the station include Tomáš Halík, Dagmar Havlová, Karel and Martina Vlček, Martin Vopěnka, Vilém Rudolf, Radek Černý, Jan Petrásek, Marek Orko Vácha, and guitarist Lubomír Brabec, who performed the most southerly concert of classical music in history aboard the Greenpeace ship MV Arctic Sunrise.

=== Disappearance of Stuchlík and Suchánek ===
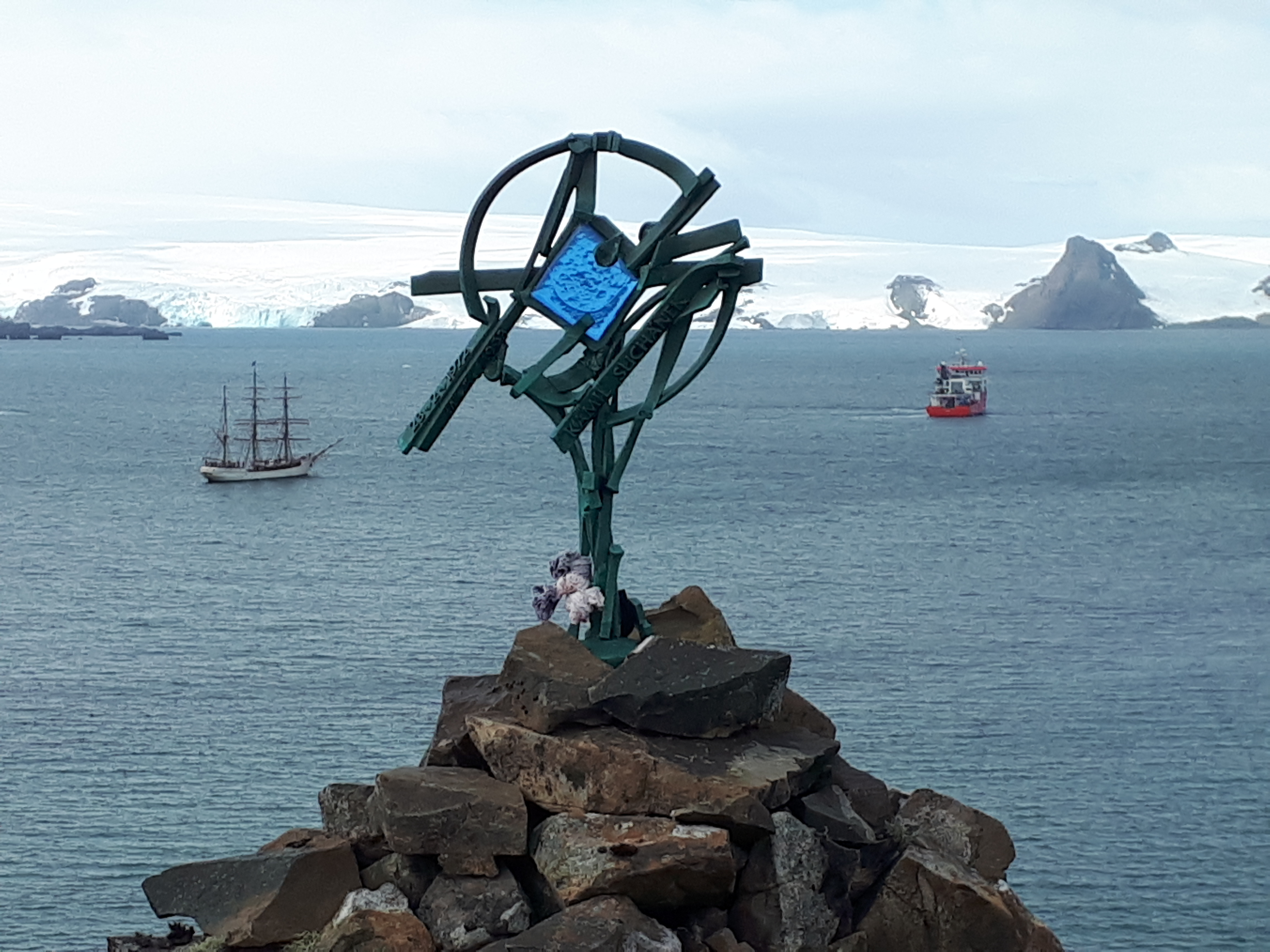
A monument by sculptor Otmar Oliva at the Chilean station on King George Island in memory of Kamil Suchánek and Miroslav Stuchlík, who were lost while sailing to the Eco-Nelson base

In September 1992, 41-year-old Miroslav Stuchlík from Mořina arrived at the station, and in January 1993, he was joined by 21-year-old Kamil Suchánek from Zlín. Both disappeared during their return journey paddling on a canoe from Korea's King Sejong Station while crossing the Fildes Strait in May 1993. A Russian and Chilean search ended with the discovery of an empty canoe. They were declared missing under Chilean law a year later, and their memorial was placed on King George Island.

The Zlín court declared Suchánek and Stuchlík dead in 1993 and 1997 respectively.

== Present ==
In 2018, the Czech Antarctic Research Programme (CARP) based at the Masaryk University in Brno became the operator of the station. In February 2019, a general clean-up was carried out in cooperation with Masaryk University and the Czech Antarctic Foundation (ČANF), removing more than 6 tons of material and adding mandatory safety equipment to classify the base as a rescue shelter or refuge. The base now meets all regulations, but it can only be used temporarily.

CARP guarantees the operation of the station in accordance with national and international law and the proper implementation of scientific research not only by Czech scientists. Until the mid 2010s, scientists used the base as a tent camp for up to 9 people for fieldwork until the planned reconstruction is completed, which depends on the financial capabilities of the ČANF and CARP.

Since 2018, research carried out at the station includes climate (automatic weather station installed in March 2018), ornithology (in collaboration with Palacký University Olomouc) and plant physiology, with plans to include geology, geomorphology, limnology, paleontology and glaciology.
