= Quesada Cove =

Antarctic cove

Location of Nelson Island in the South Shetland Islands

Quesada Cove (Bulgarian: залив Кесада, romanized: zaliv Quesada, IPA: [ˈzalif kɛˈsadɐ]) is the 2.5 km wide cove indenting for 1 km the north coast of Nelson Island in the South Shetland Islands, Antarctica west of Cariz Point and east of Meana Point. It is formed as a result of the retreat of Nelson Island's ice cap in the last decade of 20th century. The area was visited by early 19th century sealers.

The feature is named after the Spanish biologist Antonio Quesada del Corral, scientific manager of the Spanish polar activities and executive director of the Spanish Polar Committee, for his support for the Bulgarian Antarctic programme.

== Location ==
Quesada Cove is centred at 62°14′30″S 59°04′00″W. British mapping of the area in 1968.

== Maps ==
- Livingston Island to King George Island. Scale 1:200000. Admiralty Nautical Chart 1776. Taunton: UK Hydrographic Office, 1968
- South Shetland Islands. Scale 1:200000 topographic map No. 3373. DOS 610 - W 62 58. Tolworth, UK, 1968
- Antarctic Digital Database (ADD). Scale 1:250000 topographic map of Antarctica. Scientific Committee on Antarctic Research (SCAR). Since 1993, regularly upgraded and updated
