= The Toe =

Coordinates: 62°19′37″S 59°09′51″W

Location of Nelson Island in the South Shetland Islands.

The Toe is a point marking the south side of the entrance to Harmony Cove and the north-west side of the entrance to Varvara Cove on the west side of Nelson Island, in the South Shetland Islands. This descriptive name seems first to appear on a chart based upon a 1935 survey by DI personnel on the Discovery II. The Toe is part of both Antarctic Specially Protected Area Harmony Point (ASPA 133) and the BirdLife International Important Bird Area Harmony Point, Nelson Island.
