= Sabin Point =

Antarctic headland

Location of Nelson Island in the South Shetland Islands

Sabin Point (Bulgarian: нос Сабин, romanized: nos Sabin, IPA: [ˈnɔs sɐˈbin]) is the ice-covered, rock-tipped northeast entrance point of Golyam Sechko Cove projecting 250 m from the northwest coast of Nelson Island in the South Shetland Islands, Antarctica. The area was visited by early 19th century sealers.

The feature is named after the Bulgarian ruler Khan Sabin, 768-777 AD, in association with other Bulgarian historical names in the area.

== Location ==
Sabin Point is located at 62°16′29.4″S 59°11′58″W, which is 1.1 km southwest of Smilets Point. British mapping of the area in 1968.

== Maps ==
- Livingston Island to King George Island. Scale 1:200000. Admiralty Nautical Chart 1776. Taunton: UK Hydrographic Office, 1968
- South Shetland Islands. Scale 1:200000 topographic map No. 3373. DOS 610 - W 62 58. Tolworth, UK, 1968
- Antarctic Digital Database (ADD). Scale 1:250000 topographic map of Antarctica. Scientific Committee on Antarctic Research (SCAR). Since 1993, regularly upgraded and updated
