= Edgell Bay =

Body of water in Antarctica

Location of Nelson Island in the South Shetland Islands.

Edgell Bay (62°16′05″S 58°58′37″W) is a bay 1.5 nautical miles (3 km) long and wide, indenting the northeast side of Nelson Island, in the South Shetland Islands. Spiro Hill overlooks the bay. This bay appears in rough outline on Powell's chart of the South Shetland Islands published in 1822. It was recharted during 1934–35 by Discovery Investigations personnel on the Discovery II, who named it for Vice Admiral Sir John Augustine Edgell, Royal Navy.
