= Folger Rock =

Rock in the South Shetland Islands, Antarctica

Location of Nelson Island in the South Shetland Islands.

Folger Rock (62°15′44″S 59°13′50″W) is a rock lying 2.5 nautical miles (5 km) north of Harmony Point, Nelson Island, in the South Shetland Islands. It was named by the UK Antarctic Place-Names Committee in 1961 for Tristan Folger, the Master of the American sealing vessel William and Nancy from Nantucket, which visited the South Shetland Islands in 1820–21, operating from nearby Harmony Cove.
