= Nancy Rock =

South Shetland Islands rock

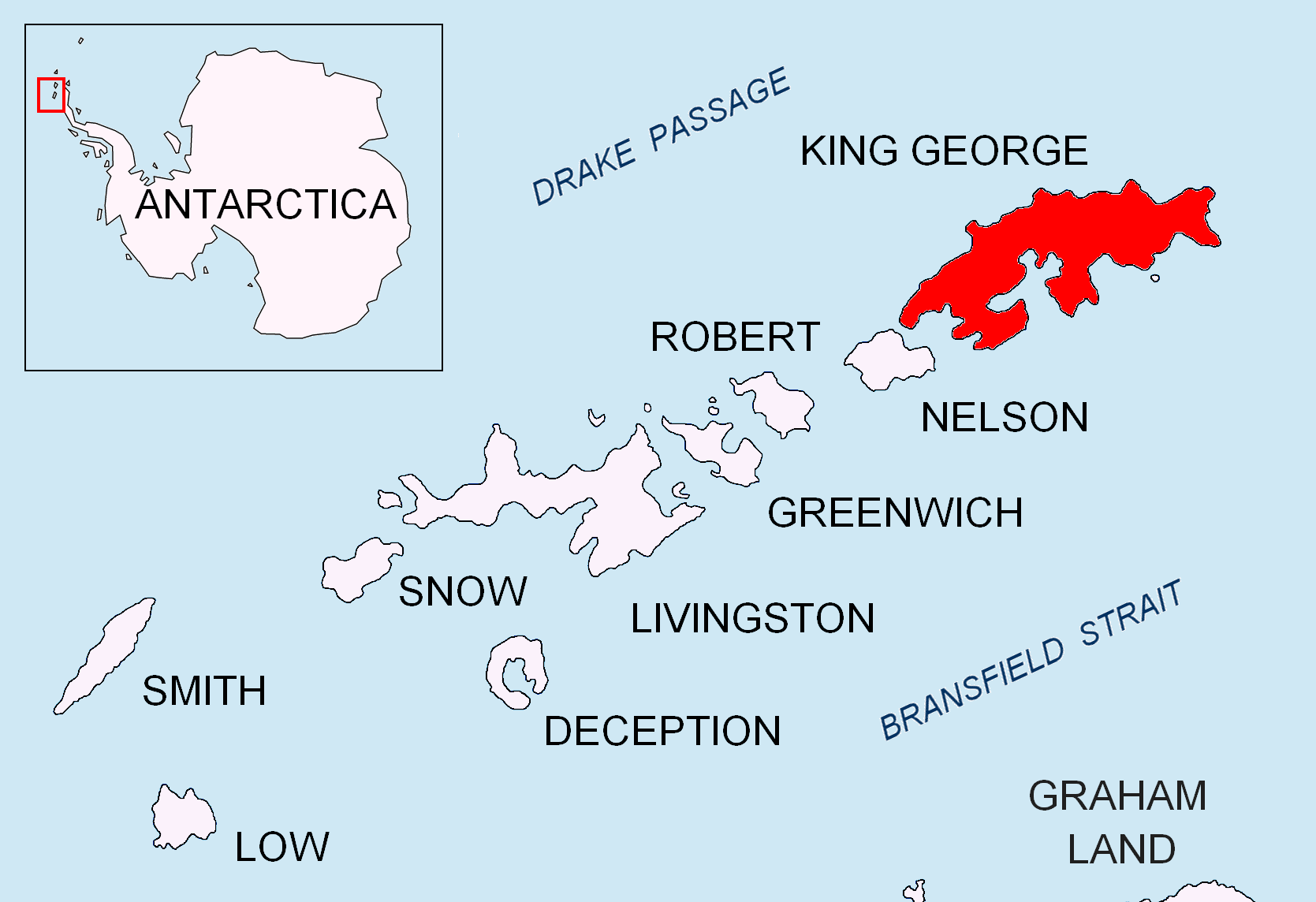
Location of King George Island in the South Shetland Islands.

Nancy Rock (62°13′01″S 59°06′04″W) is a rock in the South Shetland Islands located 2 nautical miles (3.7 km) west of Flat Top Peninsula, King George Island. The rock was named in 1961 by the United Kingdom Antarctic Place-Names Committee (UK-APC) after the American sailing vessel Nancy, from Salem, Massachusetts, that visited the South Shetland Islands around 1820–22 while captained by Benjamin Upton, namesake of Upton Rock.
