= Rip Point =

Location of Nelson Island in the South Shetland Islands.

Rip Point (62°14′15″S 58°58′45″W) is a point on Nelson Island forming the south side of the east entrance to Fildes Strait, in the South Shetland Islands. The name appears on a British Admiralty chart showing the results of a survey by DI personnel on the Discovery II in 1935.
