= Exotic Point =

Exotic Point (62°13′14″S 59°01′46″W), on the southwest side of Fildes Peninsula, King George Island, Antarctica, is an entrance point to Geographers Cove from the southwest. The name translates "Mys Ekzoticheskiy", the Russian name applied in 1968 by geologists from the Soviet Antarctic Expedition. It may be named for its rocks, which differ from those neighboring the point.
