= Tribrach (instrument) =

Adjustable mounting plate between a surveying instrument and its tripod

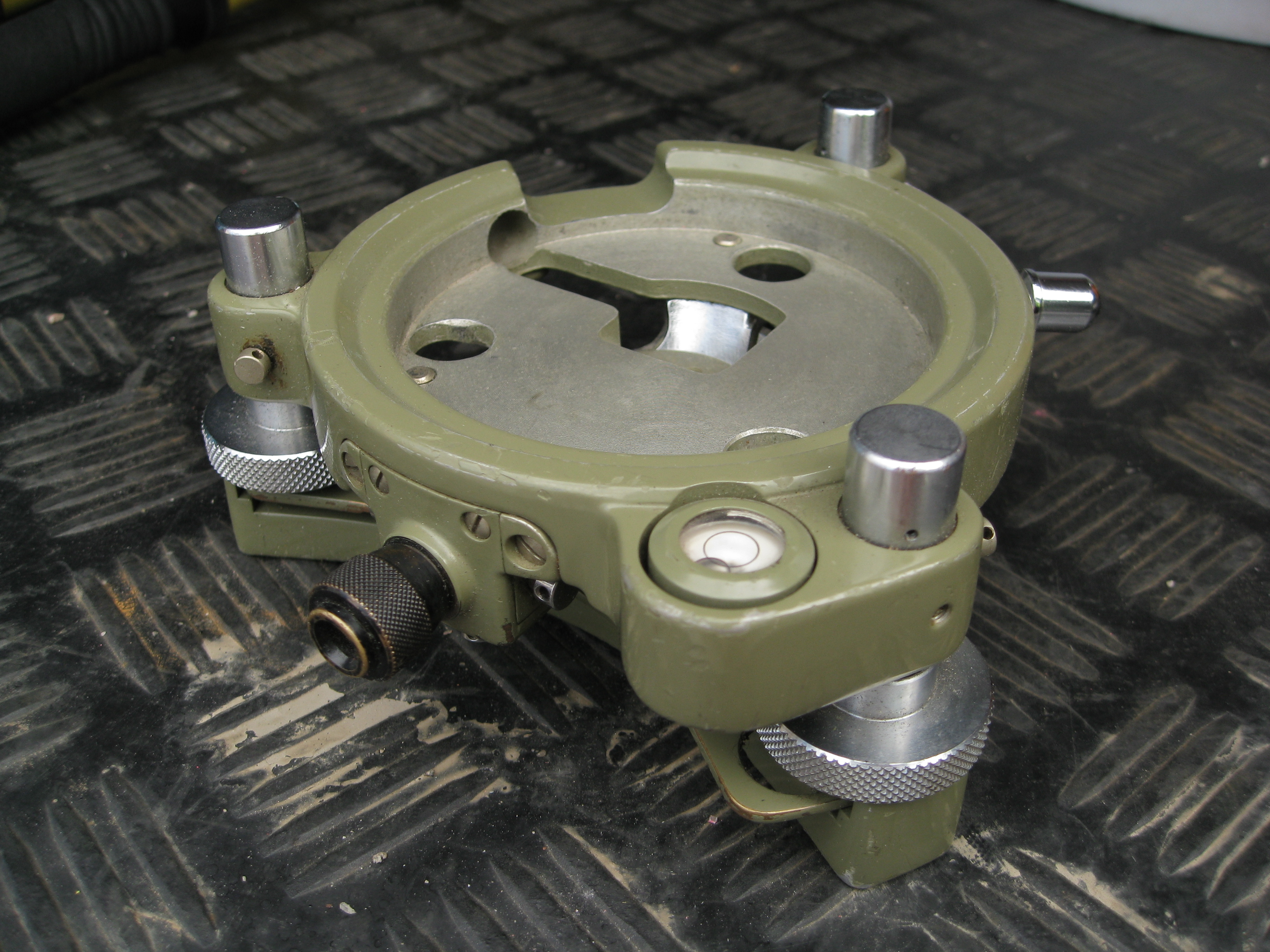
A tribrach with an optical plummet (the black cylinder pointing to the left lower corner of the image).

A tribrach is an attachment plate used to attach a surveying instrument, for example a theodolite, total station, GNSS antenna or target to a tripod. A tribrach allows the survey instrument to be repeatedly placed in the same position over a surveying marker point with sub-millimetre precision, by loosening and re-tightening a lock to adjust the instrument base in a horizontal plane.

== Components of a tribrach ==
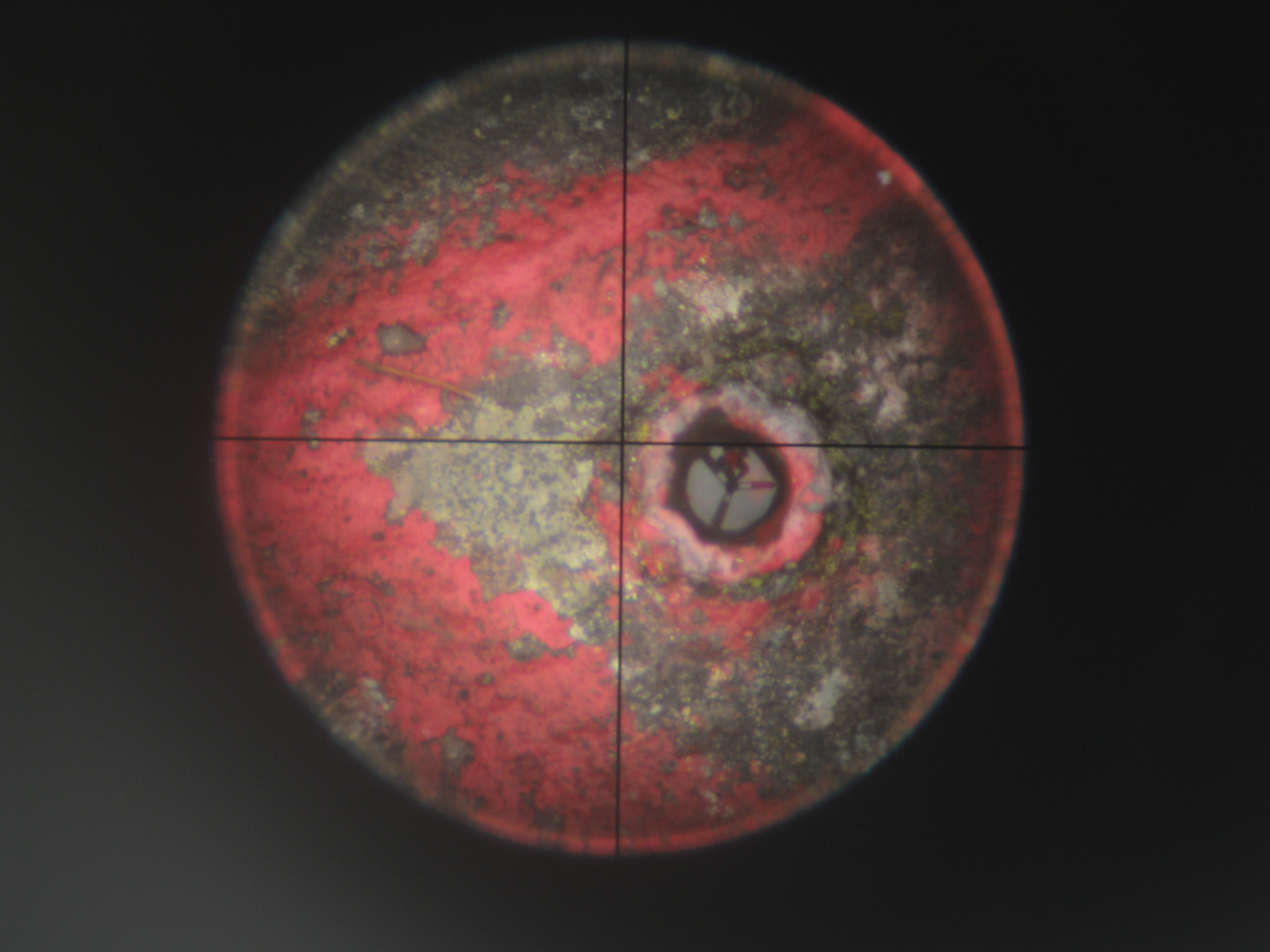
View through an optical plummet of a prism adapter.

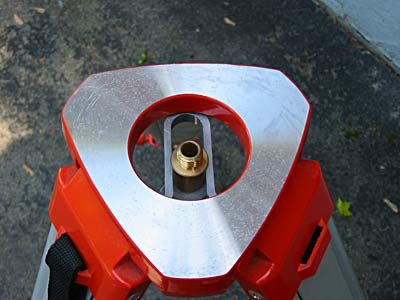
The head of a surveyor's tripod with the screw for mounting the tribrach.

The device consists of two triangular metal plates connected at their corners by leveling thumbscrews, a bubble level, a locking mechanism and often an optical plummet. The centre of the bottom plate of the tribrach has a 5/8-11 UNC thread bolt hole which is used to attach the tribrach to the tripod. The top plate has three small holes or slots spaced 120˚ apart above leveling thumbscrews, and a locking mechanism which enables a survey instrument or target to be accurately placed on the tribrach and locked in place.

The optical plummet has either a bullseye or cross-hair sight for positioning the instrument over a survey marker or ground control point. The positional accuracy from sighting through an optical plummet depends on the accuracy of the leveling, which must be performed before the final positioning. The older tribrachs required a plumb line to allow them to be positioned vertically over a point and took longer to set up.

Some modern total stations have an integral laser plummet built in.

== Using a tribrach ==
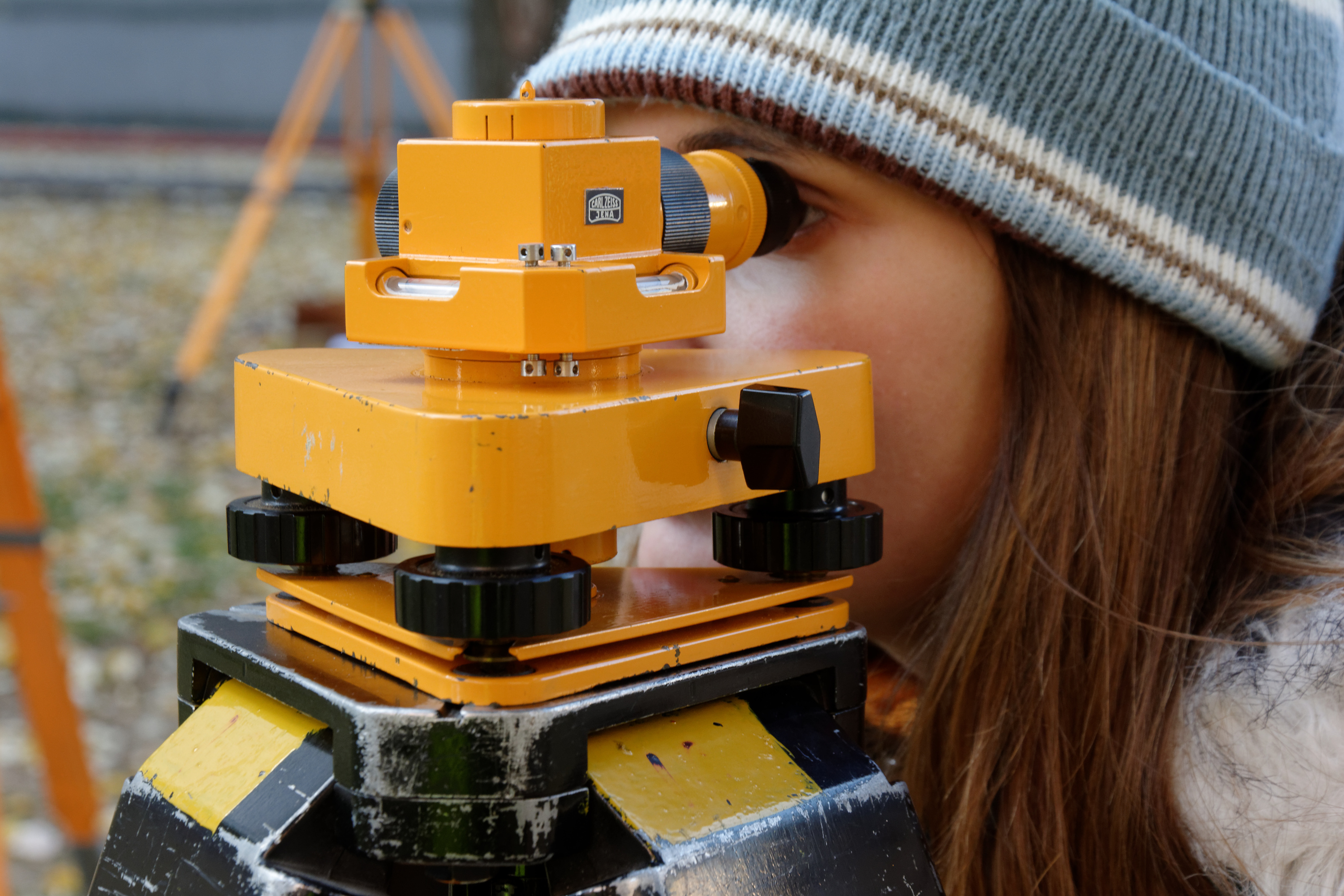
Using an optical plummet. Here the tribrach is not centered on the tripod plate as it is being aligned over the marker

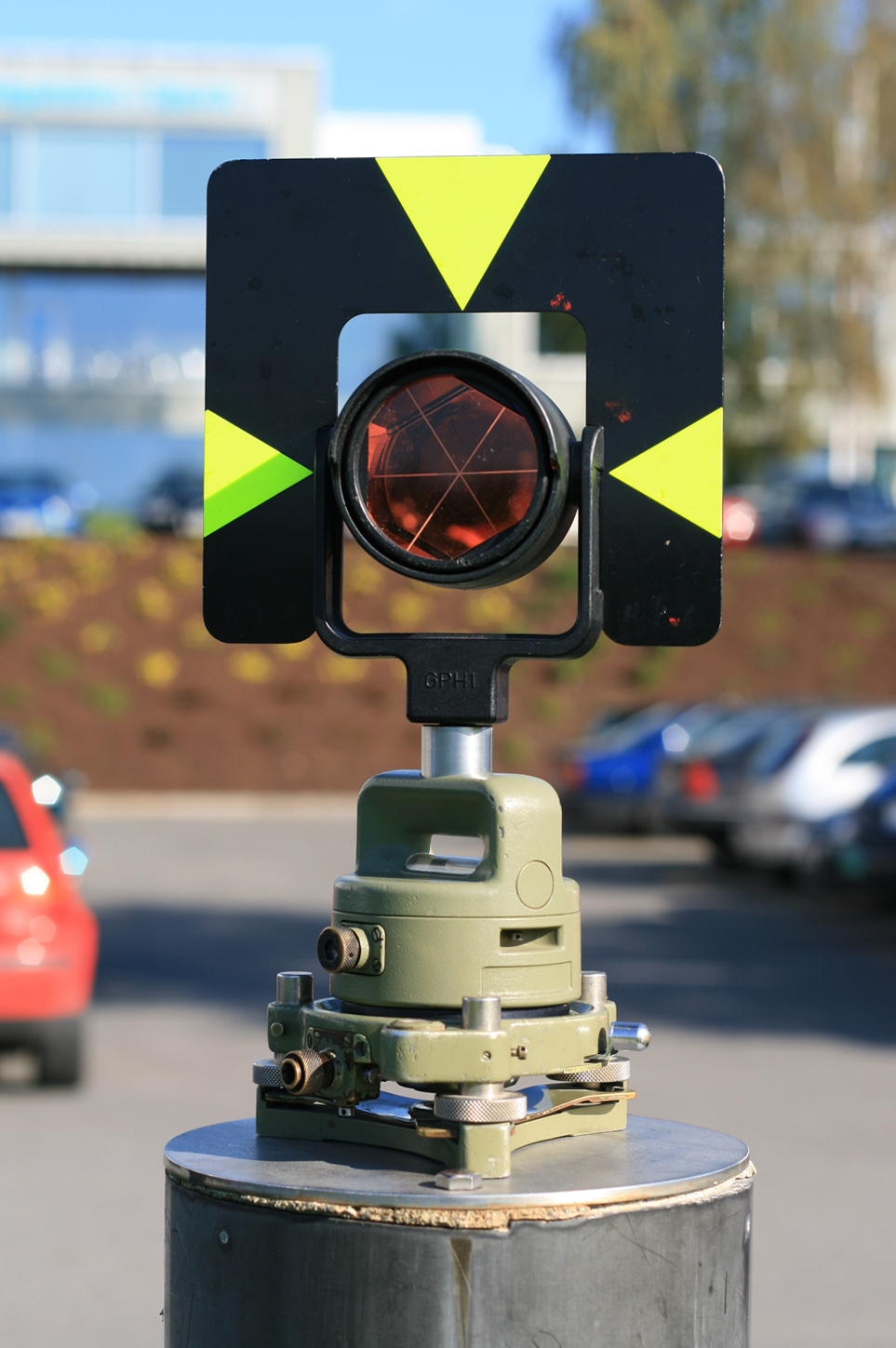
Laser reflector target on tribrach and marker column

The process is iterative between horizontal position and top plate level, because they are interactive. The following general process is followed:

- The tribrach is attached to the tripod and placed over the marker.
- Looking through the optical plummet pick up two of the tripod legs and position the cross-hairs over the marker. Tread all three legs into the grass, bitumen, concrete.
- Look through the optical plummet and using the thumbscrews put the cross-hairs back over the marker.
- Adjust the level of the tribrach by slackening the tripod screws and sliding the legs. Re-center the cross-hairs using the thumb screws, then fine-tune the level using the tripod legs. Once the tribrach is nearly centered over the marker, level the tribrach the last little bit using the thumbscrews.
- Slacken the tribrach from the tripod head and slide it the last 4-5mm so that it is centered over the marker and is level.

If the target over which the instrument is to be placed is roughly at the same elevation as the tripod feet, the preceding technique is applicable. If there is a considerable difference between the elevation of the target and the elevation of the marker and the instrument bottom plate, such as when the target is in a deep hole, or the tripod is on a Bilby tower, the target will appear to move laterally by a large distance in the optical plummet as the tribrach level is adjusted.

Tribrachs are precision instruments and should be checked regularly to ensure they do not become a source of error.
