= Sven Yrvind =

Swedish sailor, boat builder, and writer (born 1939)

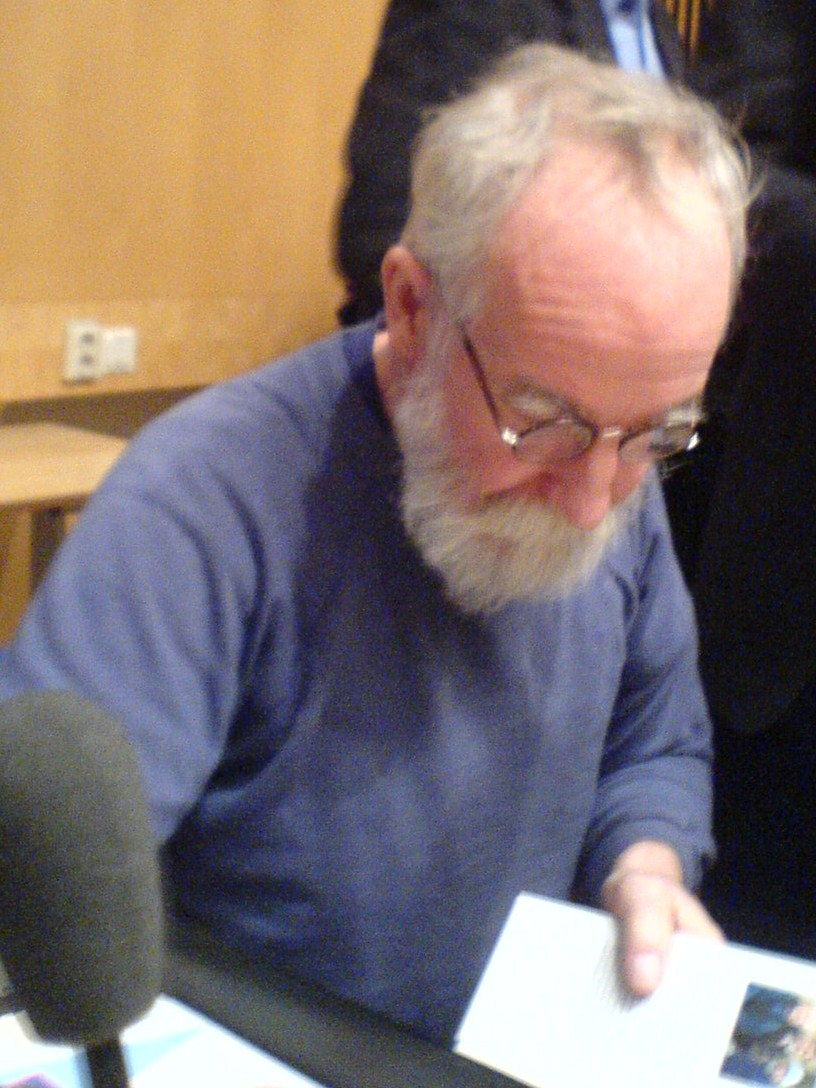
Sven Yrvind in 2008

Sven Yrvind (born 22 April 1939 in Gothenburg, Sweden as Sven Lundin) is a Swedish sailor, boat builder, and writer. He is famous for sailing alone across oceans in tiny boats of his own design.

== Sailing ==
Yrvind has made several ocean crossings in his tiny boats. In 1980, Yrvind rounded Cape Horn in 'Bris II', a 20'/5.90m boat of his own design, alone and in the middle of winter, a record for the smallest boat ever to round the Cape. This achievement won Yrvind the 1980 Royal Cruising Club medal for seamanship. In the Roaring Forties he allegedly collided with a whale.

== Boat design ==
Yrvind designs and builds the boats he sails.

- Yrvind built his first boat 'Bris I' in his mother’s basement 1971-1972. The boat's size was determined by the size of the basement: length 6.00 metres, width 1.72 m, depth 0.40/0.90 m.
- 'Bris II' was built 1976–1978 with the dimensions length 5.90 metres, width 2.40 m, depth 1.40 m.
- A later boat, 'Yrvind', at an ambitious 4.1m, eventually turned out to be too small and too slow to make major ocean passages in cold waters.
- In 2008 Sven started work on 'Yrvind.com', a 4.8 metre design inspired in part by Matt Layden's "Paradox". 'Yrvind.com' is built of divinycell, fiberglass, carbon fiber and epoxy. Sven set sail in 'Yrvind.com' for Martinique on 11 August 2011. He chose the unusual name 'Yrvind.com' in the hope that anyone spotting him on AIS would be curious enough to visit his website, where he encouraged them to report his position - thus being able to keep the world updated on his progress, despite not having any long-range communications equipment on board. Three and a half months after setting out, 'Yrvind.com' made Martinique, on 26 November 2011.
- In early 2018 Sven completed the construction of 'Exlex' ("Outlaw"). It was 5.76 metres long with a 1.04 metre beam. On 30 May 2018, at 79 years of age, Sven set out in her from Dingle, Ireland for New Zealand, which he had hoped to reach sometime in March 2019. Unfortunately, he was forced to abandon his attempt at the beginning of July, and sail to Porto Santo due to design flaws that made Exlex too unstable, slow, and hard to handle. Yrvind has announced he will design an improved model and make another attempt.
- After returning to Sweden, Sven started constructing 'Exlex Minor'. Construction was finished during the summer of 2020, and on June 30 Sven set sail from Ålesund, Norway. It quickly became apparent that the boat was unable to properly carry the provisions for the trip, making progress slow and rendering Exlex Minor unable to sail high enough into the wind. Sven was forced to abandon his original plans and sail to Azores as straight as he could.
- Having set out in his old Exlex from Porto Santo in June 2021, in early July 2021 Sven reached Horta in the Azores. From here he plans to continue west to the Sargasso Sea.

== Books ==
Yrvind's three books, "With Bris round Cape Horn" (with Anders Öhman 1985) , "Bris" (1990) and "The Constructor" (2003), are currently in the process of being translated into English.

"Den unge, den gamle och havet : Över Atlanten i en Vega" (with Thomas Grahn 2012)

== Inventions ==
Yrvind is the inventor of the Bris sextant, a small, angle-measuring instrument used in navigation.

== Youtube channel ==
Yrvind has a YouTube channel where he regularly posts videos about his endeavours. In 2023 the videos are mostly about building his newest boat.

== Honours ==
Yrvind Island in Antarctica is named after Sven Yrvind.

== See also ==
- Alain Bombard
