= Harmony Cove =

Cove in the South Shetland Islands, Antarctica

Harmony Cove (62°18′58″S 59°10′59″W) is a cove entered between Harmony Point and The Toe on the west side of Nelson Island, in the South Shetland Islands, Antarctica. It was named by American sealers in about 1820 after the sealing vessel Harmony, under Captain Thomas Ray, one of several American sealing vessels headquartered at Harmony Cove during the 1820–21 season.

The northwest side of the cove is defined by Inca Point, an isolated stack off the point which is said to bear a striking resemblance to the head of an Inca. The name "Punta Inca" seems first to appear on a 1957 Argentine hydrographic chart. An English form of the name has been approved.

== Francisco de Gurruchaga Refuge ==
Francisco de Gurruchaga Refuge
- Refuge
- Location of Francisco de Gurruchaga in Antarctic Peninsula
- Coordinates: 62°18′32″S 59°12′25″W
- Country: Argentina
- Location in Antarctic Peninsula: Cape Longing; Graham Land; Antarctica
- Administered by: Argentine Army
- Established: 1954
- Type: Seasonal
- Status: Closed

Francisco de Gurruchaga Refuge (62°18′32″S 59°12′25″W) is an Argentine naval refuge in Antarctica located on Inca Point in Harmony Cove of the Nelson Island in the South Shetland Islands. The refuge was inaugurated on December 15, 1954 and is managed by the Argentine Navy. At first it was named Refuge Harmony and used during the Argentine Antarctic campaigns of 1954-1955 and 1957–1958. It was named once as Gurruchaga Base, a temporary Antarctic base in the 1997-1998 campaign, then closed and re-used as a refuge. Its name pays homage to Francisco de Gurruchaga, who created the first Argentine naval squadron, patriot of the May Revolution, member of the Great Board of Buenos Aires and of the Assembly of the Year XIII for Salta Province. During its use as a base, a post office was opened using its own stamp.

The first chief of the base was the midshipman Raul Sotelo, and the Antarctic Task Force vessels that participated in the construction of the refuge were the ARA Chiriguano and the ARA Yámana tugs.

== See also ==
- List of Antarctic field camps
