= Golyam Sechko Cove =

Antarctic cove

Location of Nelson Island in the South Shetland Islands

Golyam Sechko Cove (Bulgarian: залив Голям Сечко, romanized: zaliv Golyam Sechko, IPA: [ˈzaliv ɡoˈlam ˈsɛt͡ʃko]) is the 2.45 km wide cove indenting for 780 m the northwest coast of Nelson Island in the South Shetland Islands, Antarctica southwest of Sabin Point. The area was visited by early 19th century sealers.

The feature is named after the Bulgarian mythical figure Golyam (big) Sechko associated with winter and cold, in relation to working in the harsh Antarctic environment.

== Location ==
Golyam Sechko Cove is centred at 62°17′00″S 59°12′35″W. British mapping of the area in 1968.

== Maps ==
- Livingston Island to King George Island. Scale 1:200000. Admiralty Nautical Chart 1776. Taunton: UK Hydrographic Office, 1968
- South Shetland Islands. Scale 1:200000 topographic map No. 3373. DOS 610 - W 62 58. Tolworth, UK, 1968
- Antarctic Digital Database (ADD). Scale 1:250000 topographic map of Antarctica. Scientific Committee on Antarctic Research (SCAR). Since 1993, regularly upgraded and updated
