= Cosmolabe =

Ancient astronomical instrument

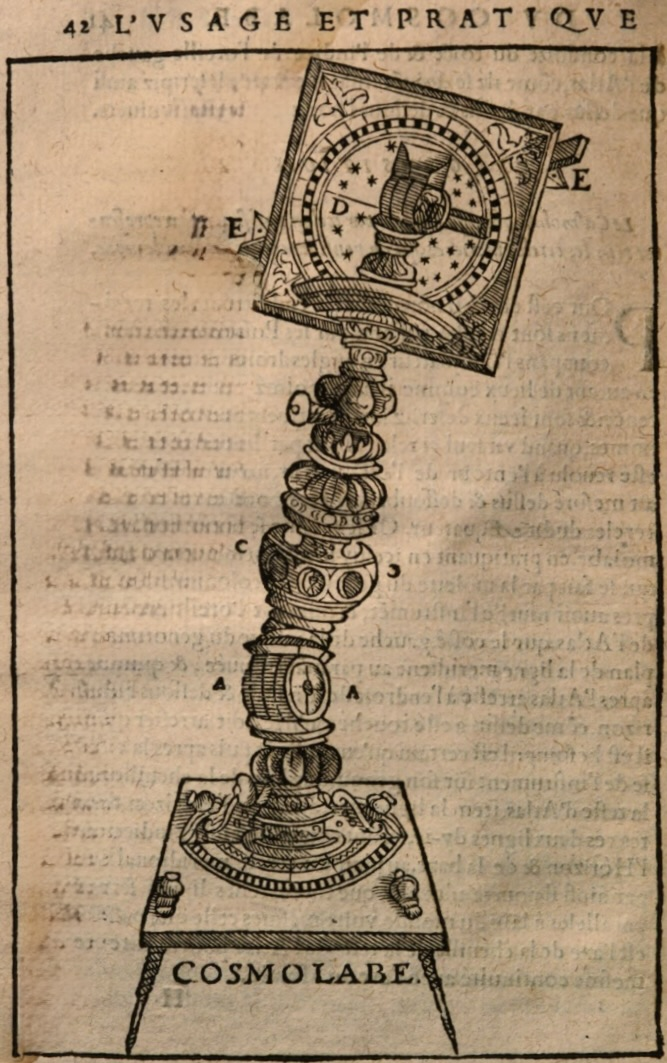
Fully Assembled Cosmolabe by Jacques Besson, 1566

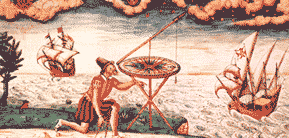
Cosmolabe, 16th century

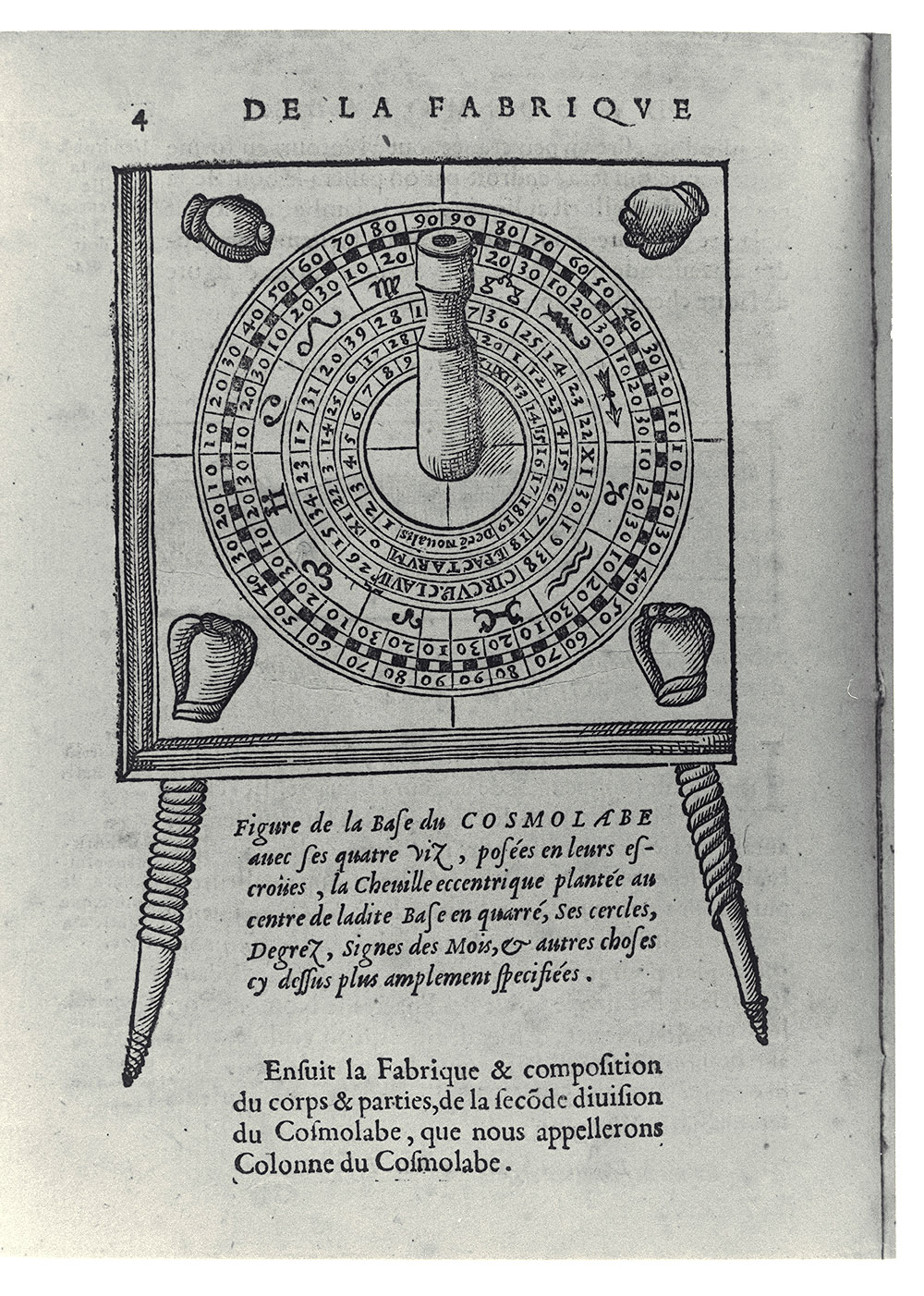
Foot of a Cosmolabe by Jacques Besson, 1566

The cosmolabe was an ancient astronomical instrument resembling the astrolabe, formerly used for measuring the angles between heavenly bodies. It is also called pantacosm. Jacques Besson also uses this name, or universal instrument, for his invention described in Le cosmolabe (1566), which could be used for astrometry, cartography, navigation, and surveying.

The cosmolabe is a comprehensive astronomical instrument designed to perform a wide range of observations and calculations, designed to serve as a universal tool capable of replacing several different previous instruments used in astronomy, geometry, and navigation. According to the inventor, the Cosmolabe can perform the functions of the Sphere, various types of Astrolabes (including the Armillary of Ptolemy, the Torquetum, and the Triquetrum), Jacob’s staff, the Geometric Square, the astronomical quadrant, and even celestial and terrestrial globes.

The instrument is designed to be leveled precisely with the horizon, and it can be used on any flat plane, regardless of its inclination. With the Cosmolabe, users can easily determine the meridian line, find the vertical and horizontal circles (almucantarats and height circles), and represent all circles of declination on a given horizon. Additionally, the Cosmolabe can be used to mark meridional circles and find the great circle passing through any two points in the sky.

A key feature of the Cosmolabe is its ability to determine the longitudes of places on Earth, both for land and sea navigation. It allows for the calculation of time and the creation of sundials on any plane. Furthermore, the instrument can be used to measure the height of the Pole using a notable northern star, determine the degree of the Sun for a given day, and find the length of the day at any location.

The Cosmolabe is also designed for practical applications in navigation, allowing for the measurement of distances between locations, the creation of chorographic maps and geographic globes, and the calculation of the route and longitude of places for maritime navigation. Its versatility extends to finding the longitudes of places by observing celestial bodies such as comets, the Moon, and fixed stars.

== General references ==
- "'Le Cosmolabe Ou Instrument Universel : Concernant Toutes Observations qui se peuvent faire Par les Sciences Mathematiques, Tant au Ciel, en la Terre, comme en la Mer' - Viewer | MDZ".
- Besson, Jacques (6 September 1566). "'Le Cosmolabe Ou Instrument Universel : Concernant Toutes Observations qui se peuvent faire Par les Sciences Mathematiques, Tant au Ciel, en la Terre, comme en la Mer' - Viewer | MDZ". Münchener Digitalisierungszentrum www.digitale-sammlungen.de.
