= Jacques Besson =

French inventor and engineer (c.1540–1573)

- Born: c. birth year – c. 1540; Colombières, Escarton de Oulx (now Cesana Torinese, Italy)
- Died: 1573 (aged 32–33); England
- Scientific career
- Fields: Engineering, mathematics, instrumentation

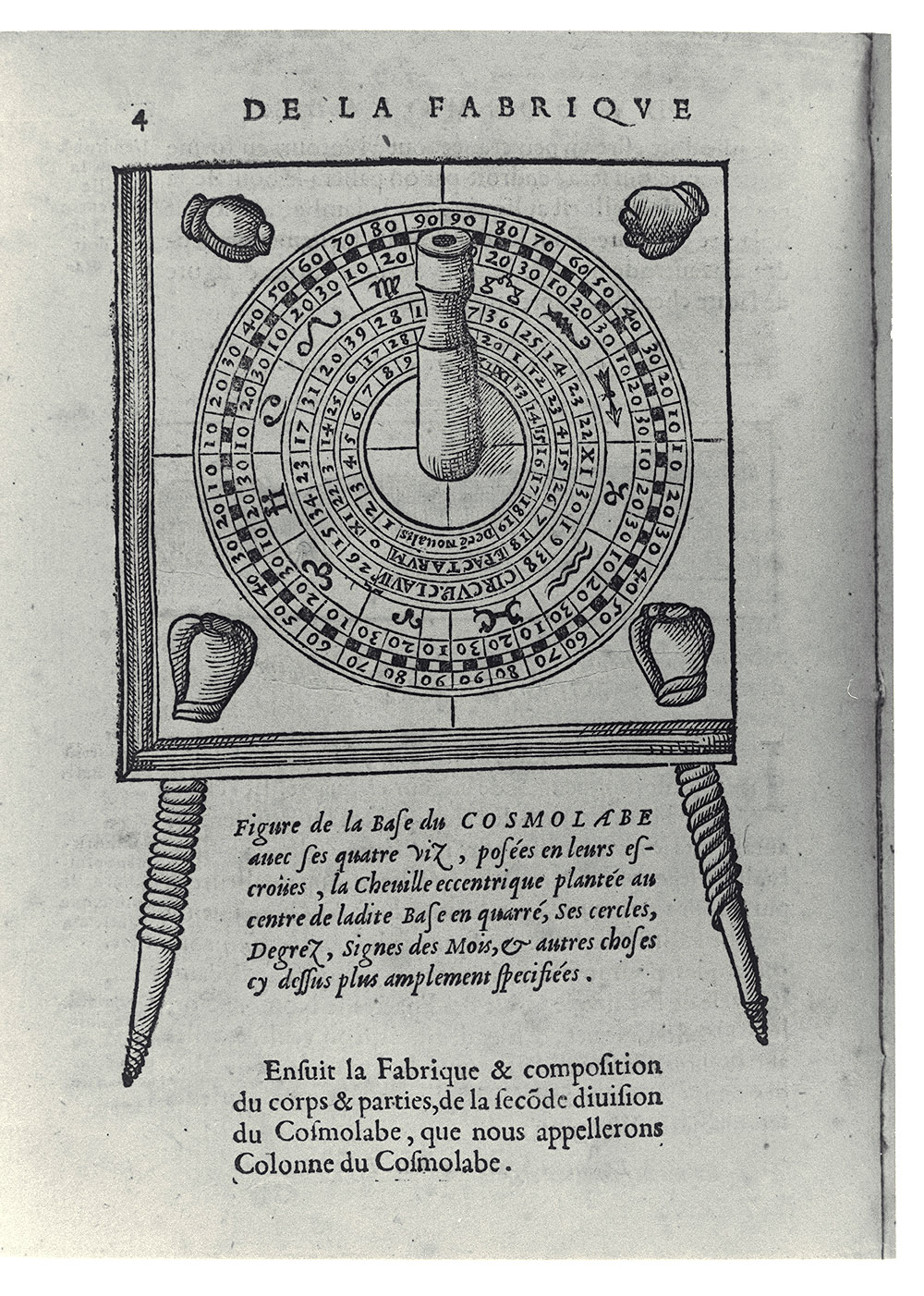
Foot piece of a Cosmolabe by Jacques Besson 1566

Jacques Besson (1540?–1573) was a French Protestant inventor, mathematician, and philosopher, chiefly remembered for his popular treatise on machines Theatrum Instrumentorum (1571–1572), which saw many reprints in different languages.

== Life ==
Little information has survived about Besson's early life; he described himself as being from Colombières, part of Escarton de Oulx, now in Cesana Torinese, Italy. He was most likely born around 1540. In the early 1550s he is recorded as teaching mathematics in Paris, following which the next account of him dates from April 1557, when he is recorded in the minutes of the town council of Lausanne, Switzerland, as being paid for models of pumps and fountains.

In 1559 he published his first treatise in Zurich, the De absoluta ratione extrahendi olea et aquas e medicamentis simplicibus (on the complete doctrine of extracting oils and waters from simple drugs), featuring an introduction by Conrad Gesner. That same year he moved to Geneva where in 1561 he requested permission to become a citizen of Geneva. His entry in Geneva's Livre de Bourgeois notes that citizenship was awarded as a result of his services "in teaching the art and science of mathematics"

In 1562 Besson became the pastor of the Protestant Reformed Church in Villeneuve-de-Berg, France, Olivier de Serres having sent a request to the Company of Pastors for a minister. However, less than two years later he was forced out by a rival. By 1565 he was back in Paris, where in 1567 he published his second treatise, Le Cosmolabe, which described an elaborate instrument based on the astrolabe which could be used for navigation, surveying, cartography, and astronomy. Le Cosmolabe also introduced a number of mechanical inventions that he hoped to describe in more detail in a future work. Besson was described as a professor of mathematics from Orléans.

== Theatrum Instrumentorum ==
When King Charles IX of France made a royal visit to Orléans in 1569, Besson presented to the King a draft of his new treatise, what was to become the Theatrum Instrumentorum. and returned with him to Paris as "master of the King's Engines". Charles gave Besson exclusive rights to his designs in that same year. While employed by the court, Besson also created an ingenious screw-cutting lathe that was semi-automatic, in that the operator only needed to pull and release a cord.

Besson's Theatrum Instrumentorum (Theater of Machines), was completed and published in 1571 or 1572. It was a unique work; previously, works on engineering and technology such as Valturio's De re militari (1472), Biringuccio's Pirotechnia (1540) and Agricola's De re metallica (1556), had had only limited descriptions of new inventions or recounted inventions of the past without much detail. In contrast, Besson's work was a collection of his own new inventions with detailed illustrations of each engraved by Jacques Androuet du Cerceau to his specifications. Some of his designs suggested important improvements to lathes and the waterwheel. The Latin captions to the highly detailed drawings were sparse, however, which would seem to indicate that the text was probably produced in a hurry. Even the title page does not give the name of the printer or the date of publication. The rush in publishing the book may have been due to the crackdown on French Protestants that culminated in the St. Bartholomew's Day Massacre of 1572.

Although Besson was favoured by King Charles IX, he feared the increasing anti-Protestant sentiment in France, and emigrated to England shortly after the St. Bartholomew's Day Massacre of 1572, where he died in 1573.

The Theatrum Instrumentorum had proved so popular that a second edition appeared in 1578, with more detailed descriptions of the instruments and machines by François Béroalde de Verville. The copper plates from the original edition were reused, except for four which were replaced by new engravings produced by René Boyvin.

== Honours ==
Besson Rock in Antarctica is named after Jacques Besson.
