= Baklan Point =

Point in the South Shetland Islands, Antarctica

Location of Nelson Island in the South Shetland Islands

Baklan Point (Bulgarian: нос Баклан, ‘Nos Baklan’ \'nos ba-'klan\) is the rocky east entrance point of Argonavt Cove on the north coast of Nelson Island in the South Shetland Islands, Antarctica projecting 450 m northwards. The area was visited by early 19th century sealers.

The point is “named after the ocean fishing trawler Baklan of the Bulgarian company Ocean Fisheries – Burgas whose ships operated in the waters of South Georgia, Kerguelen, the South Orkney Islands, South Shetland Islands and Antarctic Peninsula from 1970 to the early 1990s. The Bulgarian fishermen, along with those of the Soviet Union, Poland and East Germany are the pioneers of modern Antarctic fishing industry.”

== Location ==
Baklan Point is located at 62°14′44″S 59°06′39″W, which is 1.85 km east-northeast of Retamales Point, 3.47 km west-southwest of Cariz Point and 1 km west of Meana Point. British mapping in 1968.

== Maps ==
- Livingston Island to King George Island. Scale 1:200000. Admiralty Nautical Chart 1776. Taunton: UK Hydrographic Office, 1968.
- South Shetland Islands. Scale 1:200000 topographic map No. 3373. DOS 610 - W 62 58. Tolworth, UK, 1968.
- Antarctic Digital Database (ADD). Scale 1:250000 topographic map of Antarctica. Scientific Committee on Antarctic Research (SCAR). Since 1993, regularly upgraded and updated.
