= Bris sextant =

Celestial navigation device

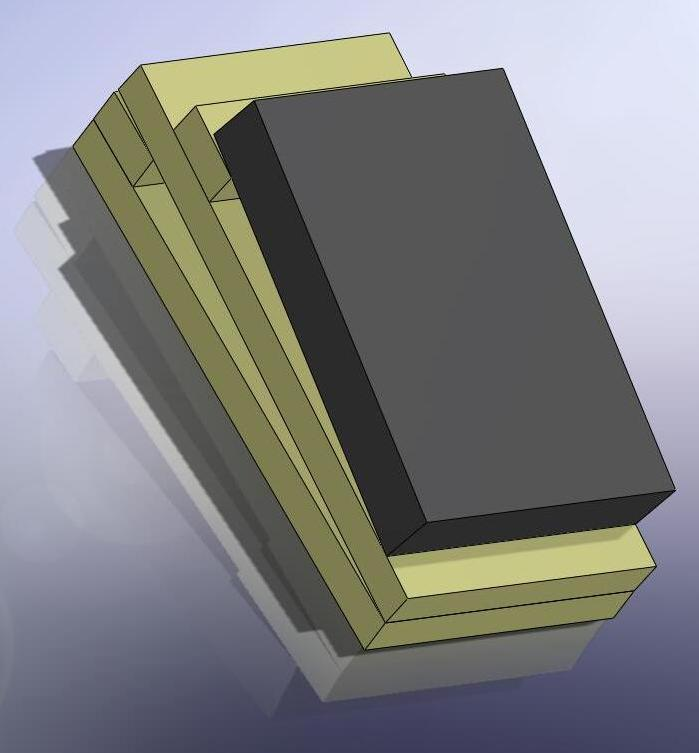
Bris sextant

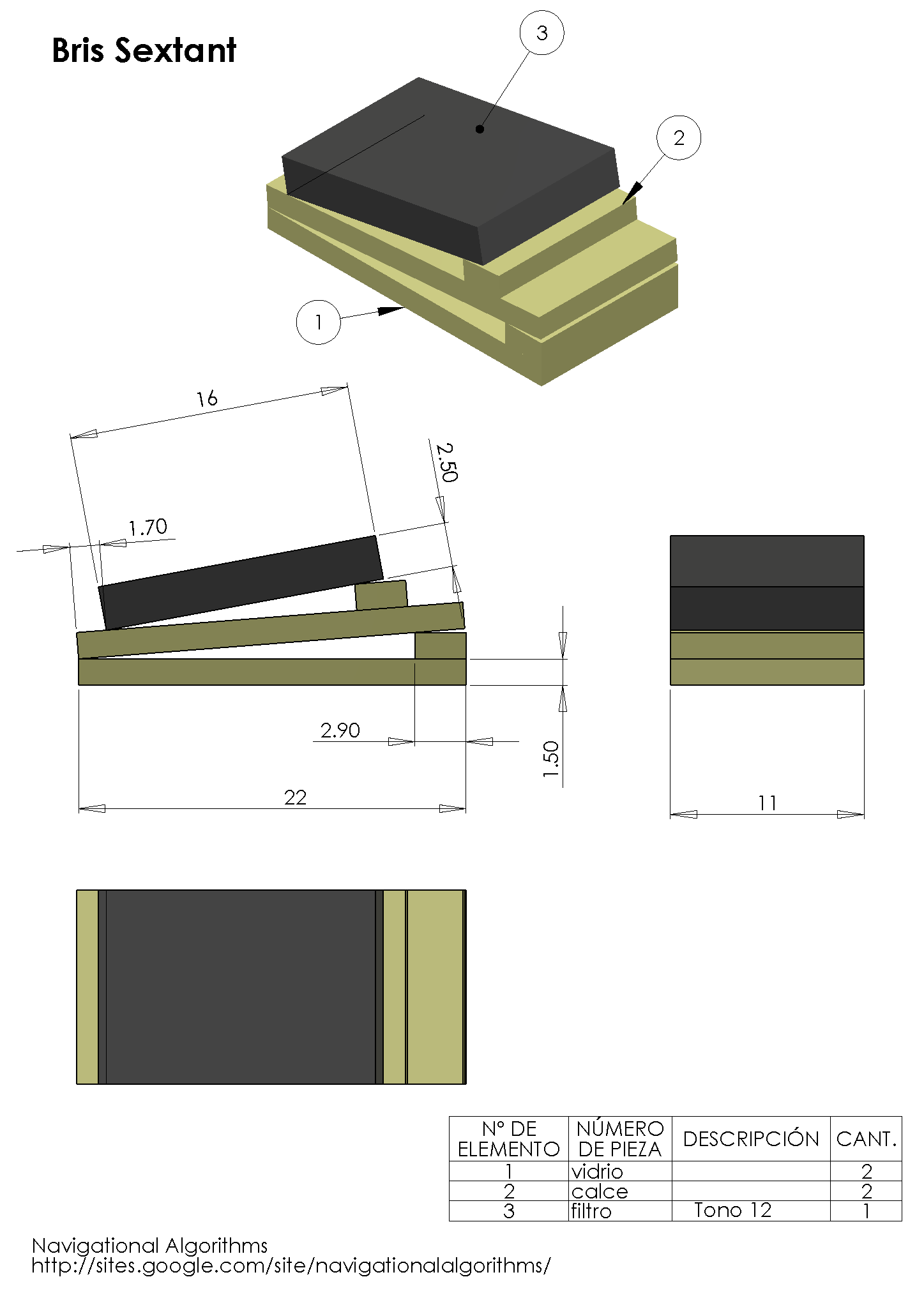
Assembly drawing of a Bris sextant, measures in millimeter

The Bris sextant /ˈbriːs/, or Bris Mini-Sextant, is not a sextant proper, but is a small angle-measuring device that can be used for navigation. The Bris is, however, a true reflecting instrument which derives its high accuracy from the same principle of double reflection which is fundamental to the octant, the true sextant, and other reflecting instruments. It differs from other sextants primarily in being a fixed angle sextant, capable of measuring a few specific angles.

== History ==
Sven Yrvind (Lundin) developed his Bris sextant in or before 2007 as part of his quest for low-cost, low-technology equipment for ocean crossings. The Bris is a low-technology, high-precision, fixed-interval instrument. It is made of two narrow, flat pieces of glass (microscope slides) permanently and rigidly mounted in a V-shape to a third flat piece of #12 welding glass to make viewing the sun eye safe. When the sun or moon is viewed through the V, it is split into eight images. The instrument is small and rugged enough that it can be kept in a 35mm film canister (water-tight, about 3 cm diameter, 4 cm tall) on a lanyard around one's neck.

The Bris sextant is calibrated at a known geographic position with a good clock and a nautical almanac. As the day passes, one works the sight reductions backwards to develop exact angles for each of the images' tops and bottoms. The Sun and Moon have approximately the same angular size from the surface of the Earth, and can use the same calibrations.

In use, one waits until an image's edge touches the horizon, and then records the time and reduces the sight using the recorded angle for that edge of the image.

== Etymology ==
Bris is Swedish for breeze. The name Bris is used by Yrvind for a number of his sail boats.

== Sources ==
- A three-page article (not available online) on the Bris sextant appeared in Yachting Monthly magazine, June 1997.
- A two-page article (not available online) on the Bris sextant appeared in Die Yacht magazine, 22/1997: Mini-Sextant: Mit einem genial einfachen Gerät verblufft Weltumsegler Sven Lundin jetzt die gesamte Fachwelt.
- Bris Mini Sextant Instructions, page 2, Sven Yrvind, 1998
