= Flat Top Peninsula =

Peninsula in King George Island, South Shetland Islands

Coordinates: 62°12′32″S 59°01′33″W

Flat Top Peninsula is a small, flat-topped peninsula 2 km (1 mi) north of the south-western extremity of King George Island in the South Shetland Islands of Antarctica. The peninsula was named on a chart based upon a survey by Discovery Investigations personnel of the Discovery II during 1935.
