= Retamales Point =

Point in the South Shetland Islands, Antarctica

Location of Nelson Island in the South Shetland Islands.

Retamales Point (Bulgarian: нос Ретамалес, ‘Nos Retamales’ \'nos re-ta-'ma-les\) is the rock-tipped northeast entrance point of Hall Cove and west entrance point of Argonavt Cove, projecting 700 m northwards from the northwest coast of Nelson Island in the South Shetland Islands, Antarctica. The area was visited by early 19th century sealers.

The point is named after José Retamales Espinoza, Director of the Chilean Antarctic Institute, for his support for the Bulgarian Antarctic programme.

== Location ==
Retamales Point is located at 62°15′10.1″S 59°08′35″W, which is 7.92 km northeast of Harmony Point, 2.85 km northeast of Smilets Point, 1.75 km south of Withem Island and 8.64 km west by south of Rip Point. British mapping in 1968.

== Maps ==
- Livingston Island to King George Island. Scale 1:200000. Admiralty Nautical Chart 1776. Taunton: UK Hydrographic Office, 1968.
- South Shetland Islands. Scale 1:200000 topographic map No. 3373. DOS 610 - W 62 58. Tolworth, UK, 1968.
- Antarctic Digital Database (ADD). Scale 1:250000 topographic map of Antarctica. Scientific Committee on Antarctic Research (SCAR). Since 1993, regularly upgraded and updated.
