= Harmony Point =

Headland of Antarctica

Coordinates: 62°18′18″S 59°14′23″W

Location of Nelson Island in the South Shetland Islands

Harmony Point is a point which lies close west of Harmony Cove and forms both the south side of the entrance to Malak Sechko Cove and the western extremity of Guangzhou Peninsula and Nelson Island, in the South Shetland Islands of Antarctica. It was charted in 1935 by Discovery Investigations personnel on the Discovery II, and named from association with Harmony Cove.

== Important Bird Area ==
The 3,069 ha area comprising the ice-free points Harmony and The Toe, together with their ice-covered vicinity has been identified as an Important Bird Area (IBA) by BirdLife International because it supports a variety of breeding birds, including one of the largest chinstrap penguin bird colonies on the Antarctic Peninsula with around 90,000 pairs. Other birds nesting at the site are gentoo penguins (3300 pairs), imperial shags (45 pairs), Wilson's and black-bellied storm petrels (1000 pairs combined), southern giant petrels (485 pairs), Cape petrels (480 pairs), Antarctic skuas (60 pairs), snowy sheathbills (140 pairs), kelp gulls (130 pairs) and Antarctic terns (170 pairs).

The site is protected as ASPA 133. Its topography is undulating, rising to 40 m, with many streams. Its abundant vegetation includes mosses, lichens, and two species of vascular plant– Antarctic Hairgrass and Antarctic Pearlwort.
