= Smilets Point =

Rocky point in the South Shetland Islands, Antarctica

Location of Nelson Island in the South Shetland Islands.

Smilets Point (Bulgarian: нос Смилец, ‘Nos Smilets’ \'nos smi-'lets\) is the rocky point on the southwest side of the entrance to Hall Cove, at the northeast end of Lambreva Beach, projecting 500 m north-northwestwards from the northwest coast of Nelson Island in the South Shetland Islands, Antarctica. The area was visited by early 19th century sealers.

The point is named after Czar Smilets of Bulgaria, 1292–1298.

== Location ==
Smilets Point is located at 62°15′58.6″S 59°11′23″W, which is 5.24 km northeast of Harmony Point and 2.85 km southwest of Retamales Point. British mapping in 1968.

== Maps ==
- Livingston Island to King George Island. Scale 1:200000. Admiralty Nautical Chart 1776. Taunton: UK Hydrographic Office, 1968.
- South Shetland Islands. Scale 1:200000 topographic map No. 3373. DOS 610 - W 62 58. Tolworth, UK, 1968.
- Antarctic Digital Database (ADD). Scale 1:250000 topographic map of Antarctica. Scientific Committee on Antarctic Research (SCAR). Since 1993, regularly upgraded and updated.
