= Withem Island =

Island in the South Shetland Islands, Antarctica

- Location of Nelson Island in the South Shetland Islands

- Location within Antarctic Peninsula Location within Antarctica

Geography
- Location: Antarctica
- Coordinates: 62°14′07″S 59°08′17″W
- Archipelago: South Shetland Islands

Administration
- Administered under the Antarctic Treaty System

Demographics
- Population: Uninhabited

Withem Island is an island lying off the northwest side of Nelson Island in the South Shetland Islands. It is situated 1.75 km north of Retamales Point and 1.73 km west-southwest of Kondor Island. The feature was named by the United Kingdom Antarctic Place-Names Committee (UK-APC) in 1961 after Nicholas Withem, master of the American sealing vessel Governor Brooks from Salem, MA, who visited the South Shetland Islands in 1820–21. Originally proposed and approved as Withen Island, the name was amended in 1990 to agree with the correct spelling of the personal name.

== See also ==
- List of antarctic and sub-antarctic islands
