= Cariz Point =

Antarctic headland

Coordinates: 62°13′57″S 59°03′00″W

Location of Nelson Island in the South Shetland Islands.

Cariz Point (Agrelo Point) is the rocky north extremity of Nelson Island in the South Shetland Islands, Antarctica. It forms the east entrance point of Quesada Cove and is located at, which is 2.5 km northeast of Meana Point, 3.7 km west-northwest of Rip Point, and 1.7 km southwest of Exotic Point on King George Island. British mapping of the area in 1968.

== Maps ==
- Livingston Island to King George Island. Scale 1:200000. Admiralty Nautical Chart 1776. Taunton: UK Hydrographic Office, 1968
- South Shetland Islands. Scale 1:200000 topographic map No. 3373. DOS 610 - W 62 58. Tolworth, UK, 1968
- Antarctic Digital Database (ADD). Scale 1:250000 topographic map of Antarctica. Scientific Committee on Antarctic Research (SCAR). Since 1993, regularly upgraded and updated
