= Nelson Island (South Shetland Islands) =

Island near King George Island in the South Shetland Islands, Antarctica

- Location of Nelson Island in the South Shetland Islands

- Location within South Shetland Islands Location within Antarctica

Geography
- Location: Antarctica
- Coordinates: 62°18′S 59°03′W
- Length: 22 km (13.7 mi)
- Width: 13 km (8.1 mi)

Administration
- Administered under the Antarctic Treaty System

Demographics
- Population: Uninhabited

Nelson Island (historical names Leipzig Island, O'Cain's Island and Strachans Island) is an island 22 kilometres (12 nmi) long and 13 kilometres (7 nmi) wide, lying southwest of King George Island in the South Shetland Islands, Antarctica. The name Nelson Island dates back to at least 1821 and is now established in international usage.

The Eco-Nelson station is located on the island.

== See also ==
- Composite Antarctic Gazetteer
- List of Antarctic and sub-Antarctic islands
- List of Antarctic islands south of 60° S
- List of Antarctic research stations
- List of Antarctic field camps
- SCAR
- Edgell Bay
- Spiro Hill
- Territorial claims in Antarctica
