= Bulgarian toponyms in Antarctica (B) =

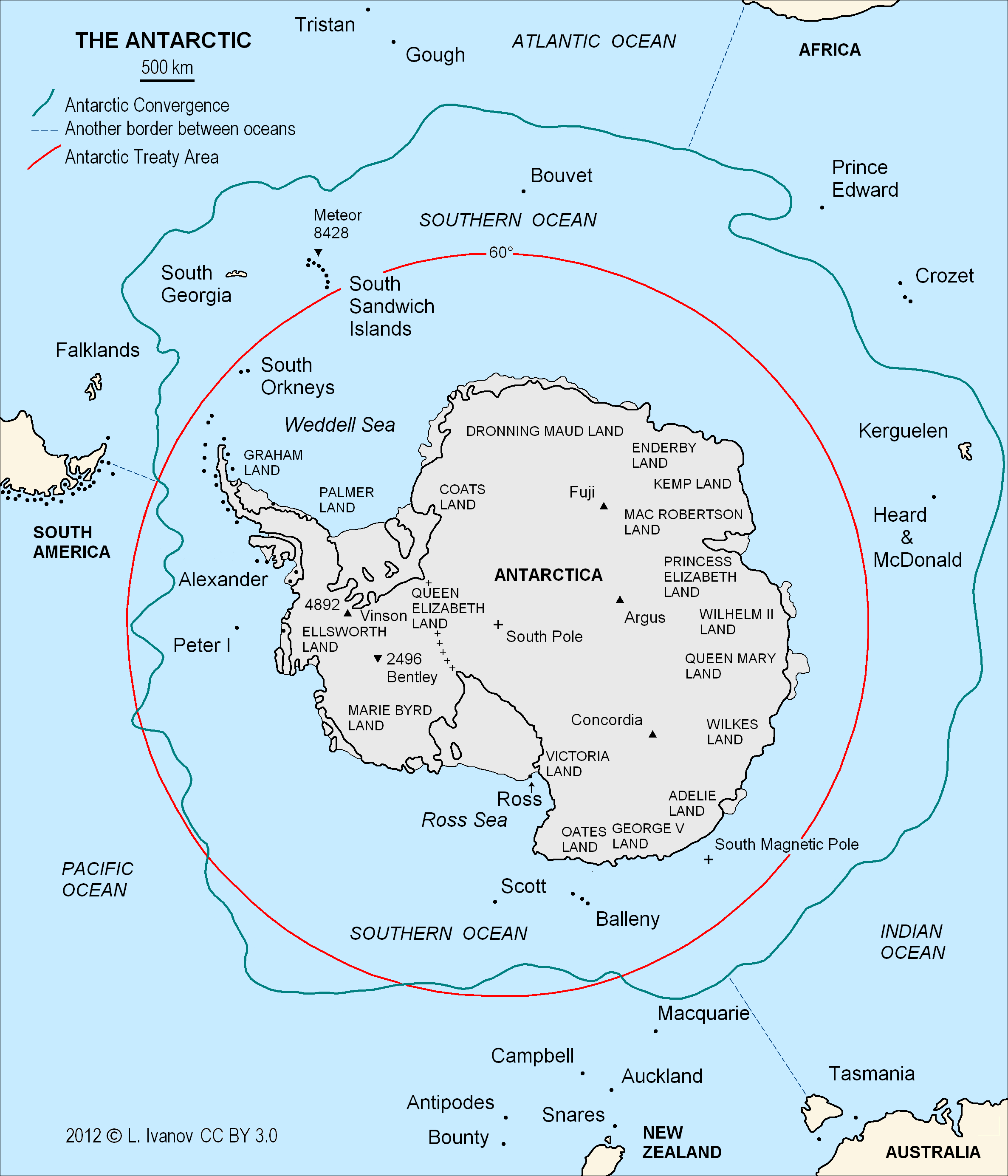
The South Polar Region.

- Baba Marta Beach, Nelson Island
- Baba Tonka Cove, Livingston Island
- Bablon Island, Graham Coast
- Bacho Kiro Peak, Danco Coast
- Bager Island, Wilhelm Archipelago
- Bagra Peak, Sentinel Range
- Bagryana Point, Greenwich Island
- Baklan Point, Nelson Island
- Bakshev Ridge, Rugged Island
- Baktriana Reef, Snow Island
- Balabanski Crag, Foyn Coast
- Balan Ridge, Alexander Island
- Balanstra Glacier, Brabant Island
- Balchik Ridge, Livingston Island
- Baley Nunatak, Trinity Peninsula
- Balgari Nunatak, Alexander Island
- Balis Ridge, Danco Coast
- Balkan Snowfield, Livingston Island
- Balkanov Peak, Liège Island
- Mount Balkanska, Alexander Island
- Ballester Point, Livingston Island
- Ballestilla Reef, Snow Island
- Balsha Island, Livingston Island
- Balvan Point, Nordenskjöld Coast
- Banari Glacier, Clarence Island
- Bangey Heights, Sentinel Range
- Bankya Peak, Davis Coast
- Bansko Peak, Livingston Island
- Bardarevo Hill, Trinity Peninsula
- Barutin Cove, Snow Island
- Barziya Peak, Loubet Coast
- Basarbovo Ridge, Brabant Island
- Batak Point, Smith Island
- Batil Spur, Sentinel Range
- Batkun Peak, Nordenskjöld Coast
- Battenberg Hill, Livingston Island
- Batuliya Point, Robert Island
- Baurene Island, Graham Coast
- Baykal Point, Brabant Island
- Beadnos Nunatak, Sentinel Range
- Bebresh Point, Liège Island
- Bekas Rock, Livingston Island
- Belchin Rock, Livingston Island
- Belene Cove, Livingston Island
- Belev Nunatak, Livingston Island
- Belgun Peak, Trinity Peninsula
- Belimel Bay, Trinity Island
- Belitsa Peninsula, Trinity Peninsula
- Belogradchik Glacier, Oscar II Coast
- Belogushev Island, Biscoe Islands
- Belomortsi Point, Livingston Island
- Beloslav Peak, Sentinel Range
- Belozem Hill, Livingston Island
- Bendida Peak, Trinity Peninsula
- Benkovski Nunatak, Greenwich Island
- Berende Cove, Greenwich Island
- Bergison Peak, Bastien Range
- Beripara Cove, Liège Island
- Berisad Glacier, Sentinel Range
- Berkovitsa Glacier, Livingston Island
- Beroe Hill, Livingston Island
- Beron Point, Robert Island
- Berrister Gap, Livingston Island
- Bersame Glacier, Clarence Island
- Bersin Ridge, Oscar II Coast
- Bertius Inlet, Wilkins Coast
- Besapara Hill, Livingston Island
- Beslen Island, Low Island
- Besson Rock, Nelson Island
- Bezbog Peak, Trinity Peninsula
- Bezden Peak, Sentinel Range
- Bezenšek Spur, Trinity Peninsula
- Bezmer Point, Livingston Island
- Bigla Ridge, Foyn Coast
- Bikorn Lake, Robert Island
- Bilyana Island, Aitcho Islands
- Bilyar Point, Livingston Island
- Binkos Point, Danco Coast
- Biolchev Peak, Foyn Coast
- Biruni Island, Elephant Island
- Biser Point, Graham Coast
- Bistra Glacier, Smith Island
- Bizone Rock, Snow Island
- Blagoevgrad Peninsula, Oscar II Coast
- Blagun Glacier, Graham Coast
- Blenika Peak, Sentinel Range
- Blesna Peak, Brabant Island
- Boatin Island, Robert Island
- Bodloperka Island, Wilhelm Archipelago
- Boeritsa Point, Livingston Island
- Bogdan Ridge, Greenwich Island
- Bogomil Cove, Rugged Island
- Bohot Nunatak, Sentinel Range
- Boil Point, Trinity Peninsula
- Boisguehenneuc Bay, Liège Island
- Bolbabria Cove, Liège Island
- Bolgar Buttress, Nordenskjöld Coast
- Bolgrad Glacier, Sentinel Range
- Bonev Peak, Danco Coast
- Bononia Cove, Nelson Island
- Borda Rock, Smith Island
- Borima Bay, Oscar II Coast
- Borovan Knoll, Trinity Peninsula
- Boryana Glacier, Nordenskjöld Coast
- Mount Bosnek, Oscar II Coast
- Botev Peak, Livingston Island
- Botev Point, Livingston Island
- Bourchier Cove, Smith Island
- Bov Point, Brabant Island
- Bowles Ridge, Livingston Island
- Bowles West Peak, Livingston Island
- Boyadzhiev Point, Elephant Island
- Boyana Glacier, Livingston Island
- Boynik Point, Desolation Island
- Bozhinov Glacier, Danco Coast
- Bozveli Peak, Trinity Peninsula
- Brahe Rock, Livingston Island
- Branishte Peak, Sentinel Range
- Brashlyan Cove, Smith Island
- Bratsigovo Hills, Trinity Peninsula
- Brauro Cove, Snow Island
- Brenitsa Glacier, Oscar II Coast
- Brentopara Inlet, Oscar II Coast
- Breste Cove, Tower Island
- Breze Peak, Alexander Island
- Breznik Heights, Greenwich Island
- Brichebor Peak, Vinson Massif
- Bris Rock, Nelson Island
- Brocks Peak, Sentinel Range
- Bruguière Peak, Sentinel Range
- Brusen Point, Greenwich Island
- Buache Peak, Two Hummock Island
- Buchino Rocks, Greenwich Island
- Bulgarian Beach, Livingston Island
- Buneva Point, Alexander Island
- Bunovo Peak, Fallières Coast
- Buragara Cove, Brabant Island
- Burdenis Glacier, Sentinel Range
- Burdick South Peak, Livingston Island
- Burdick West Peak, Livingston Island
- Burel Hill, Desolation Island
- Burevestnik Glacier, Brabant Island
- Burgas Peninsula, Livingston Island
- Burya Point, Trinity Island
- Butamya Glacier, Graham Coast
- Butrointsi Point, Two Hummock Island
- Byaga Point, Graham Coast

== See also ==
- Bulgarian toponyms in Antarctica

== Bibliography ==
- J. Stewart. Antarctica: An Encyclopedia. Jefferson, N.C. and London: McFarland, 2011. 1771 pp. ISBN 978-0-7864-3590-6
- L. Ivanov. Bulgarian Names in Antarctica. Sofia: Manfred Wörner Foundation, 2021. Second edition. 539 pp. ISBN 978-619-90008-5-4 (in Bulgarian)
- G. Bakardzhieva. Bulgarian toponyms in Antarctica. Paisiy Hilendarski University of Plovdiv: Research Papers. Vol. 56, Book 1, Part A, 2018 – Languages and Literature, pp. 104-119 (in Bulgarian)
- L. Ivanov and N. Ivanova. Bulgarian names. In: The World of Antarctica. Generis Publishing, 2022. pp. 114-115. ISBN 979-8-88676-403-1
