= Mount Mecheva =

Mountain in Graham Land, Antarctica

- връх Мечева
- Location within Antarctica

Highest point
- Elevation: 1,367 m (4,485 ft)
- Coordinates: 66°30′11″S 64°00′12″W

Geography
- Location: Antarctica
- Parent range: Bigla Ridge

Mount Mecheva (Bulgarian: връх Мечева, romanized: vrah Mecheva, IPA: [ˈvrɤx ˈmɛt͡ʃɛvɐ]) is the broad ice-covered peak with precipitous rocky north, east and southwest slopes that peaks at 1367 m in the Bigla Ridge on Foyn Coast, Antarctic Peninsula. It surmounts Beaglehole Glacier to the southwest, Sleipnir Glacier to the northwest and Cabinet Inlet to the northeast.

The feature is named after Rumyana Mecheva, biologist at St. Kliment Ohridski Base in 1999/2000 and subsequent seasons.

== Location ==
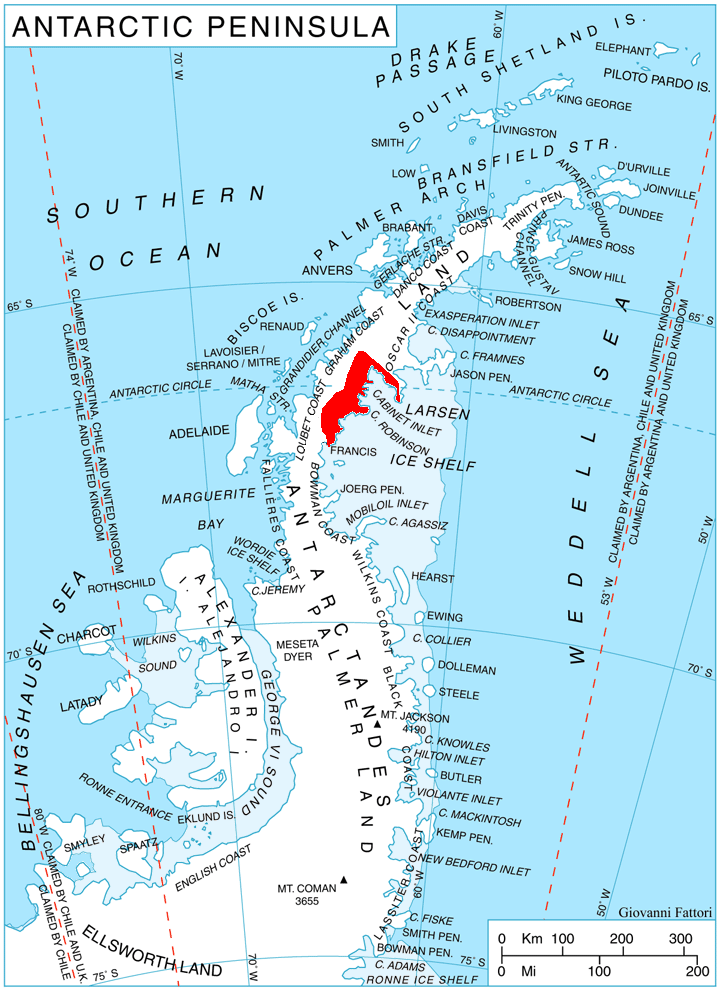
Location of Foyn Coast on Antarctic Peninsula.

Mount Mecheva is located in the Bigla Ridge, 13 km southwest of Balder Point, 13.7 km northwest of Spur Point, 14.9 km north of Varad Point and 6.87 km northeast of Chuypetlovo Knoll. British mapping in 1974 and 1976.

== Maps ==
- British Antarctic Territory: Graham Land. Scale 1:250000 topographic map. BAS 250 Series, Sheet SQ 19–20. London, 1974.
- British Antarctic Territory. Scale 1:200000 topographic map. DOS 610 Series, Sheet W 66 64. Directorate of Overseas Surveys, Tolworth, UK, 1976.
- Antarctic Digital Database (ADD). Scale 1:250000 topographic map of Antarctica. Scientific Committee on Antarctic Research (SCAR). Since 1993, regularly upgraded and updated.
