= Chemish Ridge =

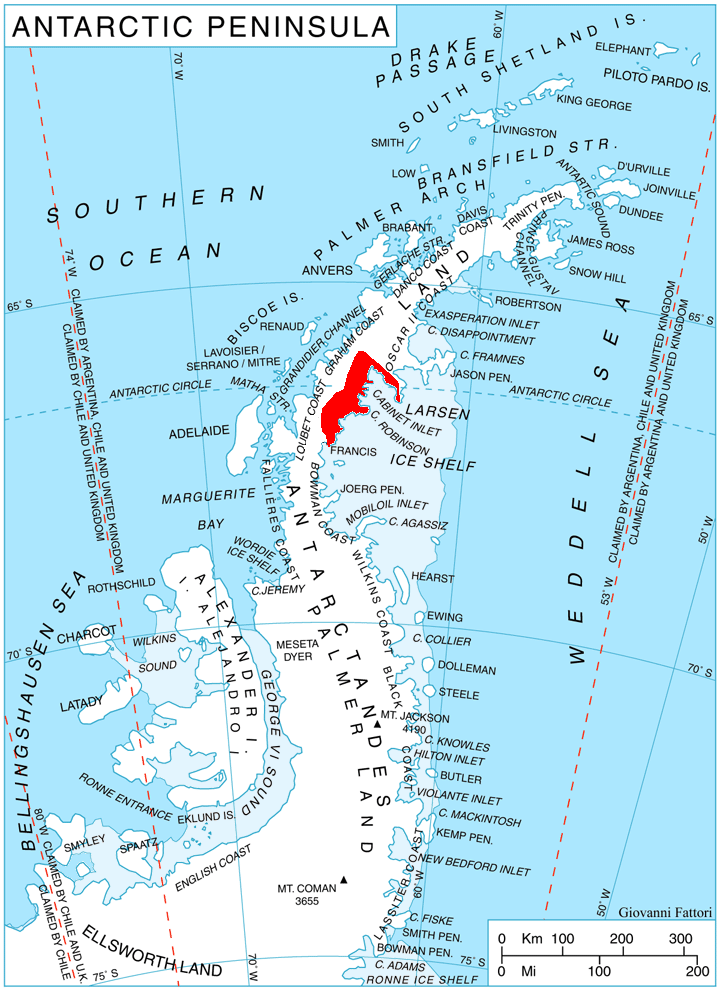
Location of Foyn Coast on Antarctic Peninsula.

Chemish Ridge (Bulgarian: хребет Чемиш, ‘Hrebet Chemish’ \'hre-bet 'che-mish\) is the rocky ridge extending 8.55 km in west-northwest to east-southeast direction, 2 km wide and rising to 880 m on Foyn Coast, Antarctic Peninsula. The ridge surmounts Attlee Glacier to the north and Bevin Glacier to the south, with its east extremity forming Fitzmaurice Point.

The feature is named after the settlement of Chemish in Northwestern Bulgaria.

== Location ==
Chemish Ridge is located at 66°15′17″S 63°46′12″W, which is 6.55 km southeast of Meda Nunatak, 13.15 km southwest of Bastion Peak and 9.52 km northeast of Gluhar Hill. British mapping in 1974.

== Maps ==
- British Antarctic Territory: Graham Land. Scale 1:250000 topographic map. BAS 250 Series, Sheet SQ 19–20. London, 1974.
- Antarctic Digital Database (ADD). Scale 1:250000 topographic map of Antarctica. Scientific Committee on Antarctic Research (SCAR). Since 1993, regularly upgraded and updated.
