= Mount Popov =

Mountain in Graham Land, Antarctica

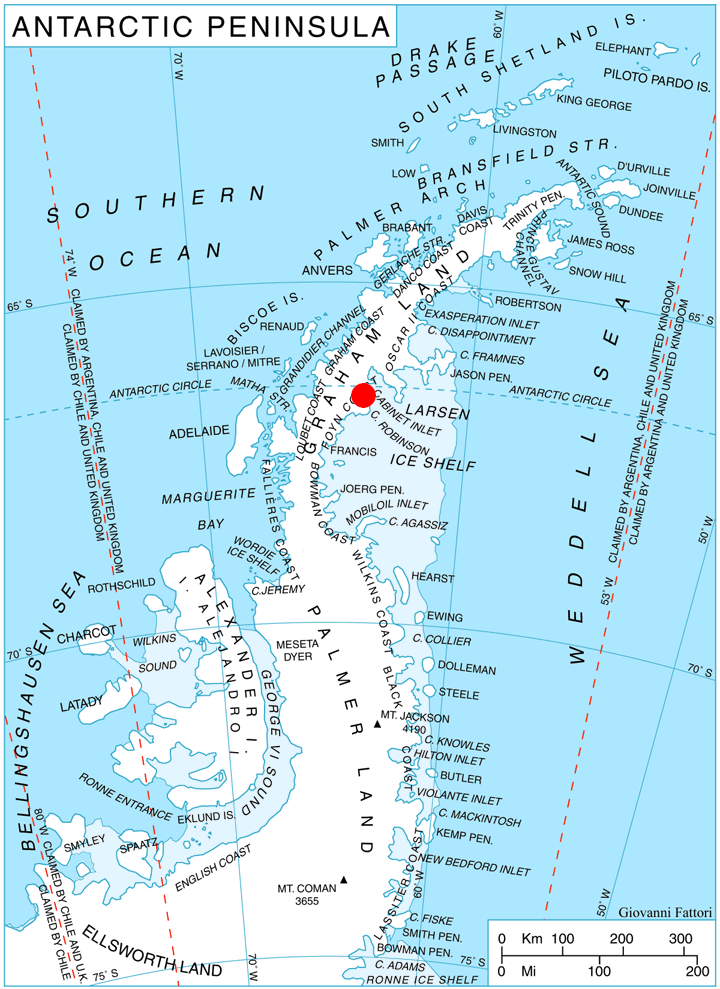
Location of Heros Peninsula in Graham Land, Antarctic Peninsula.

Mount Popov (Bulgarian: Попов връх, romanized: Popov vrah, IPA: [poˈpɔv ˈvrɤx]) is the broad ice-covered peak with precipitous rocky slopes rising to 1248 m in eastern Bigla Ridge on Heros Peninsula, Foyn Coast on the Antarctic Peninsula. It surmounts Beaglehole Glacier to the west and Cabinet Inlet to the northeast.

The feature is named after Todor Popov, physician at St. Kliment Ohridski Base during the 1996/97 and 1997/98 seasons.

== Location ==
Mount Popov is located at 66°31′35″S 63°55′24″W, which is 12.3 km southwest of Balder Point, 8.96 km northwest of Spur Point and 13.3 km northeast of Varad Point. British mapping in 1974.

== Maps ==
- British Antarctic Territory: Graham Land. Scale 1:250000 topographic map. BAS 250 Series, Sheet SQ 19–20. London, 1974.
- Antarctic Digital Database (ADD). Scale 1:250000 topographic map of Antarctica. Scientific Committee on Antarctic Research (SCAR). Since 1993, regularly upgraded and updated.
