= Stancheva Peak =

Ice-covered peak on Foyn Coast, Antarctica

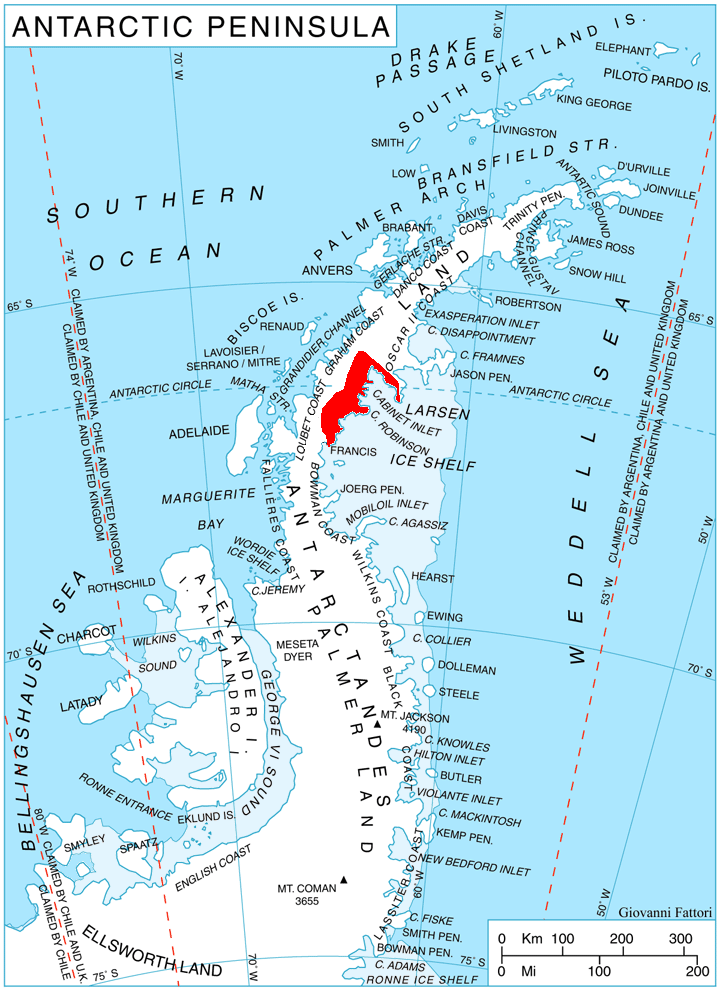
Location of Foyn Coast on Antarctic Peninsula.

Stancheva Peak (Bulgarian: връх Станчева, romanized: vrah Stancheva, IPA: [ˈvrɤx ˈstant͡ʃɛvɐ]) is an ice-covered peak that forms the west extremity of Bigla Ridge on Foyn Coast, Antarctic Peninsula. It rises to 1644 m and has precipitous rocky northwest, southeast and southwest slopes. It surmounts Sleipnir Glacier to the north and Beaglehole Glacier to the south.

The feature is named after Kameliya Stancheva, participant in the 1996/97 Bulgarian Antarctic campaign, for her support for the Bulgarian Antarctic programme.

== Location ==
Stancheva Peak is located at 66°30′55″S 64°08′54″W, which is 4.6 km south of Vologes Ridge, 6.68 km west-southwest of Mount Mecheva and 5.05 km northwest of Chuypetlovo Knoll. British mapping in 1976.

== Maps ==
- British Antarctic Territory. Scale 1:200000 topographic map. DOS 610 Series, Sheet W 66 64. Directorate of Overseas Surveys, Tolworth, UK, 1976.
- Antarctic Digital Database (ADD). Scale 1:250000 topographic map of Antarctica. Scientific Committee on Antarctic Research (SCAR). Since 1993, regularly upgraded and updated.
