= Balabanski Crag =

Rocky peak on Bigla Ridge, Antarctica

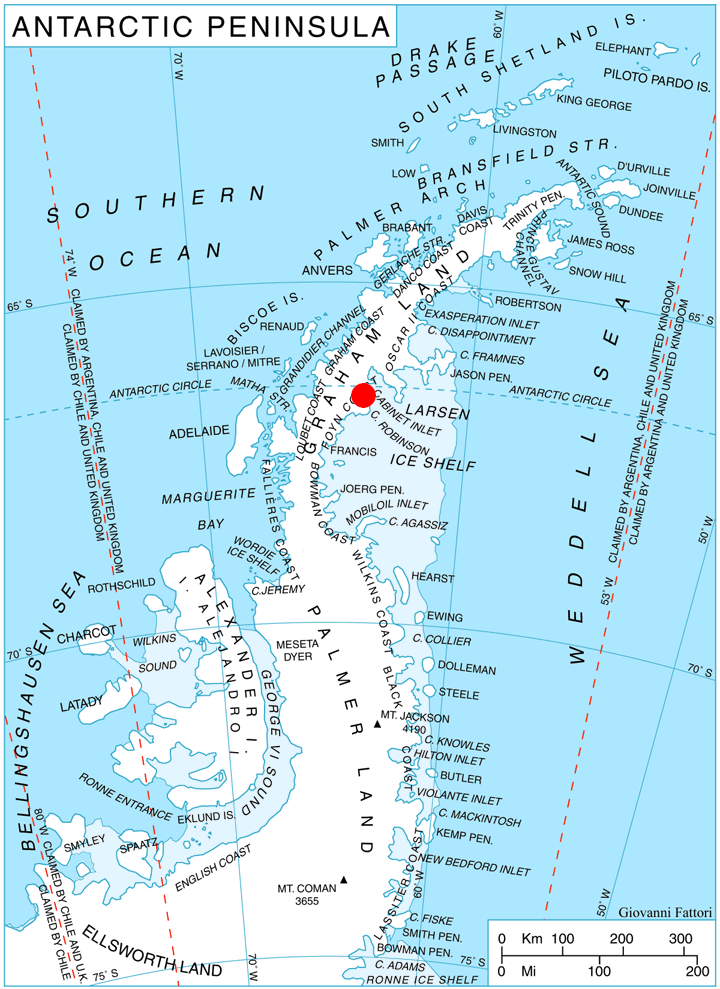
Location of Heros Peninsula in Graham Land, Antarctic Peninsula.

Balabanski Crag (Bulgarian: Балабански камък, ‘Balabanski Kamak’ \ba-la-'ban-ski 'ka-m&k\) is the rocky peak rising to 833 m in eastern Bigla Ridge on Heros Peninsula, Foyn Coast on the Antarctic Peninsula. It surmounts Cabinet Inlet to the northeast.

The feature is named after Dimitar Balabanski, physicist at St. Kliment Ohridski Base in 1994/95 and subsequent seasons.

== Location ==
Balabanski Crag is located at 66°31′40″S 63°50′25″W, which is 3.68 km east of Mount Popov, 10.66 km south-southwest of Balder Point and 7.5 km north by west of Spur Point. British mapping in 1974.

== Maps ==
- British Antarctic Territory: Graham Land. Scale 1:250000 topographic map. BAS 250 Series, Sheet SQ 19–20. London, 1974.
- Antarctic Digital Database (ADD). Scale 1:250000 topographic map of Antarctica. Scientific Committee on Antarctic Research (SCAR). Since 1993, regularly upgraded and updated.
