= Stanley Island, Antarctica =

Island in Antarctica

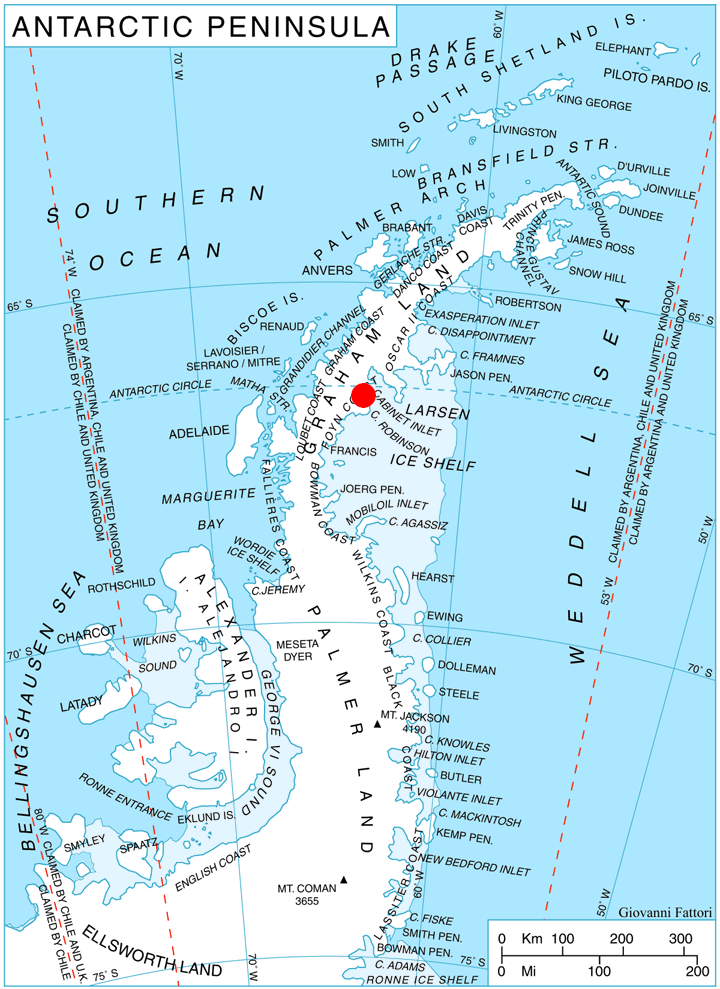
Location of Heros Peninsula in Graham Land, Antarctic Peninsula.

Stanley Island (66°32′S 63°40′W) is a 3.2 km (2 mi) long and 520 m high island off Heros Peninsula on Foyn Coast, Antarctica. It lies in the western part of Cabinet Inlet, 8 km (5 mi) northeast of Spur Point and 6 km (4 mi) east of Balabanski Crag.

The island was charted by the FIDS in 1947 and named for Rt. Hon. Oliver F.G. Stanley, M.P., Secretary of State for the British Colonies, who played an important part in establishing the survey. This island was photographed from the air during 1947 by the Ronne Antarctic Research Expedition under Finn Ronne.
