= Zabergan Peak =

Mountain in Antarctica

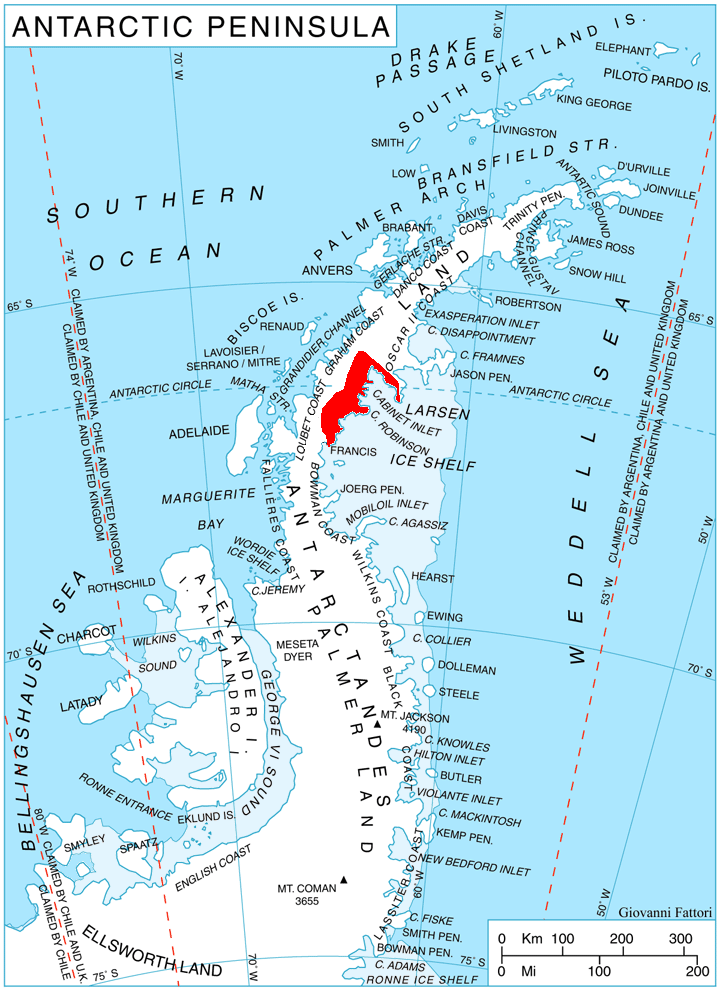
Location of Foyn Coast on Antarctic Peninsula.

Zabergan Peak (Bulgarian: връх Заберган, romanized: vrah Zabergan, IPA: [ˈvrɤɣ zɐbɛrˈɡan]) is the rocky peak rising to 1039 m on Foyn Coast, Antarctic Peninsula, and surmounting Beaglehole Glacier to the northeast and Friederichsen Glacier to the southwest.

The feature is named after the Bulgar ruler Zabergan (6th century).

== Location ==
Zabergan Peak is located at 66°37′00″S 64°06′29″W, which is 7.06 km south of Chuypetlovo Knoll, 9.3 km west of Takev Point and 2.2 km northwest of Varad Point. British mapping in 1976.

== Maps ==
- British Antarctic Territory. Scale 1:200000 topographic map. DOS 610 Series, Sheet W 66 64. Directorate of Overseas Surveys, Tolworth, UK, 1976.
- Antarctic Digital Database (ADD). Scale 1:250000 topographic map of Antarctica. Scientific Committee on Antarctic Research (SCAR). Since 1993, regularly upgraded and updated.
