= Biolchev Peak =

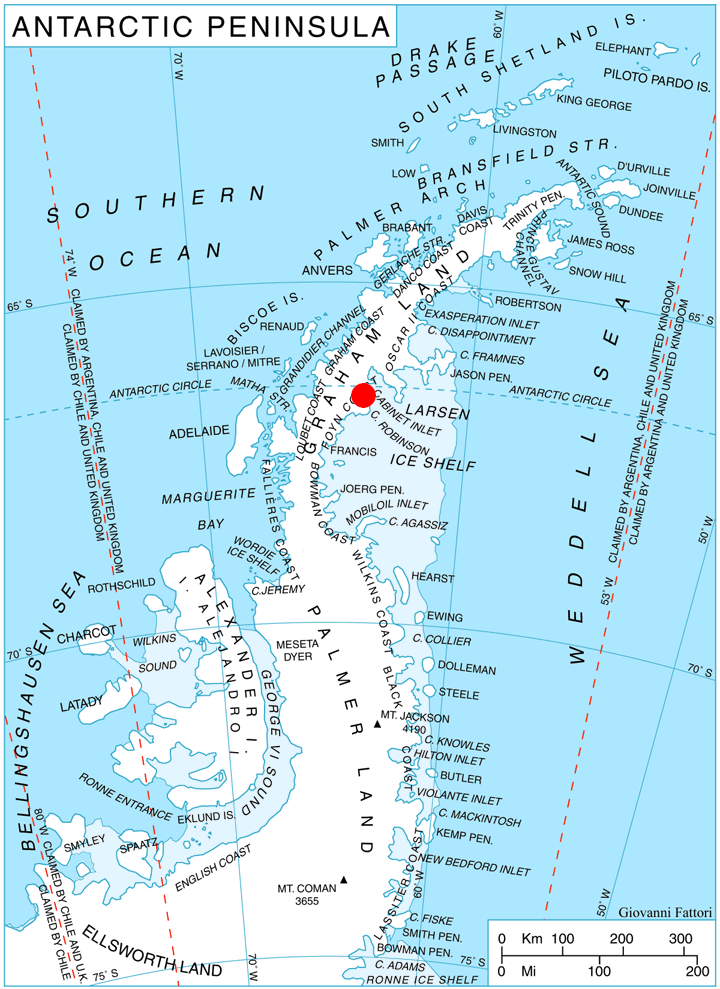
Location of Heros Peninsula in Graham Land, Antarctic Peninsula.

Biolchev Peak (Bulgarian: Биолчев връх, romanized: Biolchev vrah, IPA: [biˈɔɫt͡ʃɛv ˈvrɤx]) is the rocky peak rising to 1066 m in eastern Bigla Ridge on Heros Peninsula, Foyn Coast on the Antarctic Peninsula. It surmounts Beaglehole Glacier to the west.

The feature is named after Boyan Biolchev, participant in the Bulgarian Antarctic campaigns in 2000/01 and subsequent seasons, for his support for the Bulgarian Antarctic programme.

== Location ==
Biolchev Peak is located at 66°33′51″S 63°56′13″W, which is 4.2 km south of Mount Popov, 4.8 km north-northwest of Takev Point and 6.9 km east of Chuypetlovo Knoll. British mapping in 1974.

== Maps ==
- British Antarctic Territory: Graham Land. Scale 1:250000 topographic map. BAS 250 Series, Sheet SQ 19–20. London, 1974.
- Antarctic Digital Database (ADD). Scale 1:250000 topographic map of Antarctica. Scientific Committee on Antarctic Research (SCAR). Since 1993, regularly upgraded and updated.
