= Chuypetlovo Knoll =

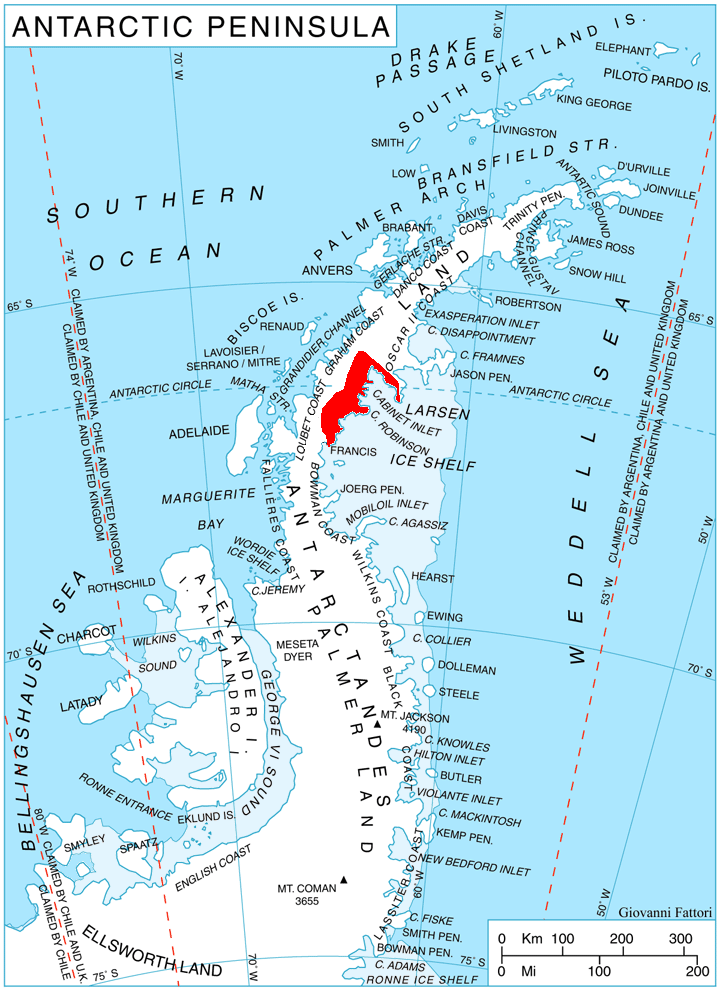
Location of Foyn Coast on Antarctic Peninsula.

Chuypetlovo Knoll (Bulgarian: Чуйпетловска могила, ‘Chuypetlovska Mogila’ \chuy-pe-'tlov-ska mo-'gi-labi-gla\) is the conspicuous rocky ridge in Beaglehole Glacier extending 3.7 km in southeast-northwest direction, 1.9 km wide and rising to 960 m southwest of Bigla Ridge on Foyn Coast, Antarctic Peninsula.

The feature is named after the settlement of Chuypetlovo in Western Bulgaria.

== Location ==
Chuypetlovo Knoll is located at 66°33′14″S 64°05′26″W, which is 5.05 km southeast of Stancheva Peak, 6.87 km southwest of Mount Mecheva, 6.9 km west of Biolchev Peak and 8.62 km north of Varad Point. British mapping in 1976.

== Maps ==
- British Antarctic Territory. Scale 1:200000 topographic map. DOS 610 Series, Sheet W 66 64. Directorate of Overseas Surveys, Tolworth, UK, 1976.
- Antarctic Digital Database (ADD). Scale 1:250000 topographic map of Antarctica. Scientific Committee on Antarctic Research (SCAR). Since 1993, regularly upgraded and updated.
