= Gluhar Hill =

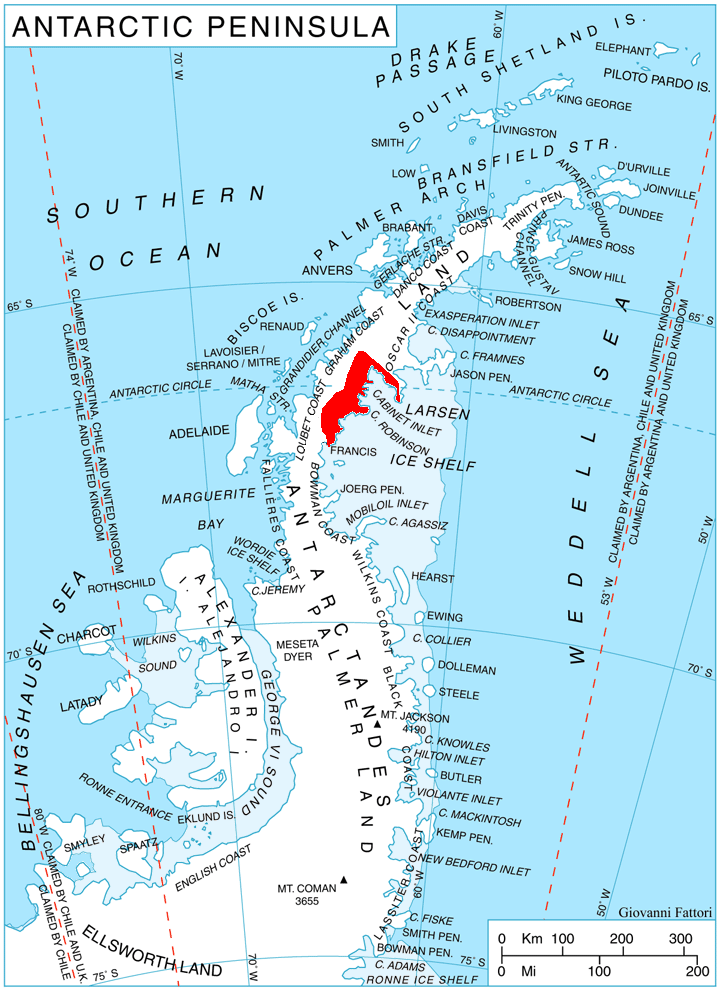
Location of Foyn Coast on Antarctic Peninsula.

Gluhar Hill (Bulgarian: хълм Глухар, ‘Halm Gluhar’ \'h&lm glu-'har\) is the ice-covered hill rising to 1054 m in Bevin Glacier on Foyn Coast, Antarctic Peninsula.

The feature is named after the settlement of Gluhar in Southern Bulgaria.

== Location ==
Gluhar Hill is located at 66°16′06″S 63°58′45″W, which is 6.52 km southwest of Meda Nunatak and 12.25 km W of Fitzmaurice Point. British mapping in 1974.

== Maps ==
- British Antarctic Territory: Graham Land. Scale 1:250000 topographic map. BAS 250 Series, Sheet SQ 19–20. London, 1974.
- Antarctic Digital Database (ADD). Scale 1:250000 topographic map of Antarctica. Scientific Committee on Antarctic Research (SCAR), 1993–2016.
