= Meda Nunatak =

Nunatak in Graham Land, Antarctica

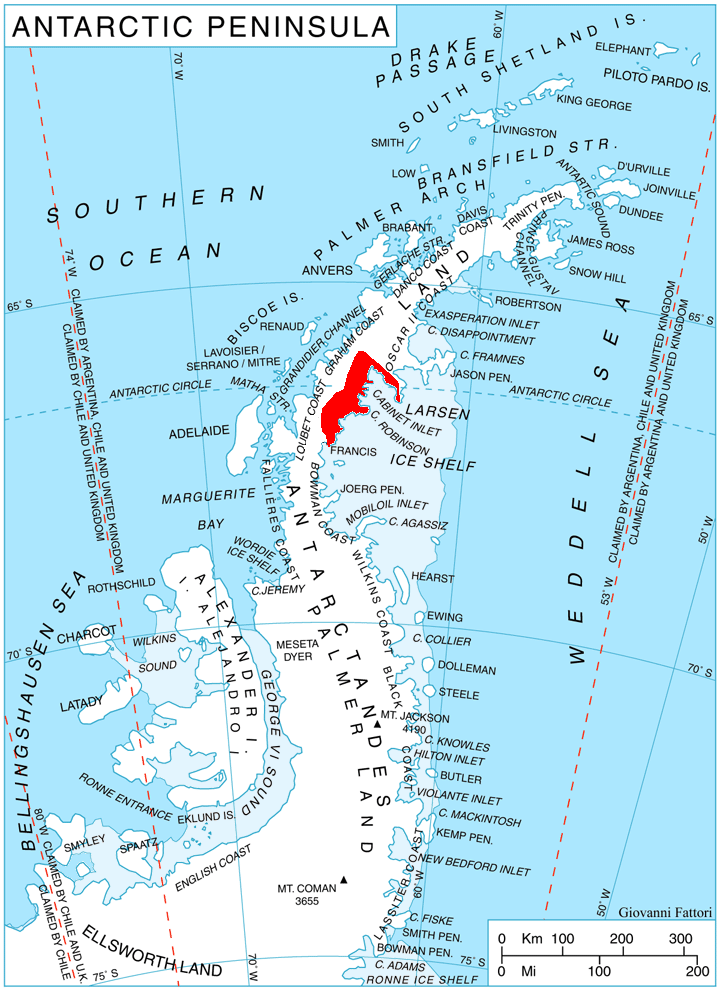
Location of Foyn Coast on Antarctic Peninsula.

Meda Nunatak (Bulgarian: нунатак Меда, ‘Nunatak Meda’ \'nu-na-tak 'me-da\) is the rocky ridge extending 2.65 km in west-northwest to east-southeast direction, 700 m wide and rising to 1128 m in Attlee Glacier on Foyn Coast, Antarctic Peninsula.

The feature is named after Meda of Odessos (4th century BC), a Thracian princess and wife of Philip II of Macedon.

== Location ==
Meda Nunatak is located at 66°13′19″S 63°53′28″W, which is 15.35 km southwest of Bastion Peak, 8.8 km west-northwest of Fitzmaurice Point and 6.52 km northeast of Gluhar Hill. British mapping in 1974.

== Maps ==
- British Antarctic Territory: Graham Land. Scale 1:250000 topographic map. BAS 250 Series, Sheet SQ 19–20. London, 1974.
- Antarctic Digital Database (ADD). Scale 1:250000 topographic map of Antarctica. Scientific Committee on Antarctic Research (SCAR). Since 1993, regularly upgraded and updated.
