= Mount Odin (Graham Land) =

Mountain in Graham Land, Antarctica

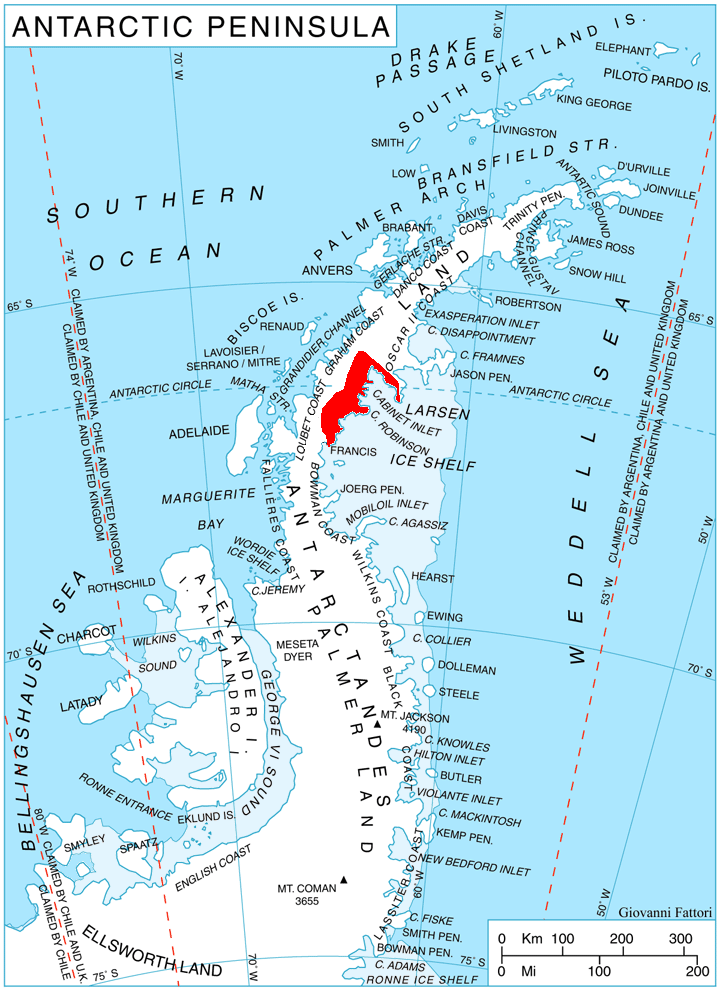
Location of Foyn Coast on Antarctic Peninsula.

Mount Odin (66°26′S 64°03′W) is a saddle-top mountain on the Foyn Coast of Graham Land, Antarctica. It consists of two ice-covered peaks and stands 1,465 m (4,806 ft) tall. It is situated close to Frigga Peak to the southwest, on the divide between Anderson Glacier and Sleipnir Glacier. In 1947, the peak was photographed from the air by the Ronne Antarctic Research Expedition (RARE) and charted from the ground by the Falkland Islands Dependencies Survey (FIDS). It was named by FIDS personnel after the Norse god Odin, the mythological husband of Frigga.
