= Vologes Ridge =

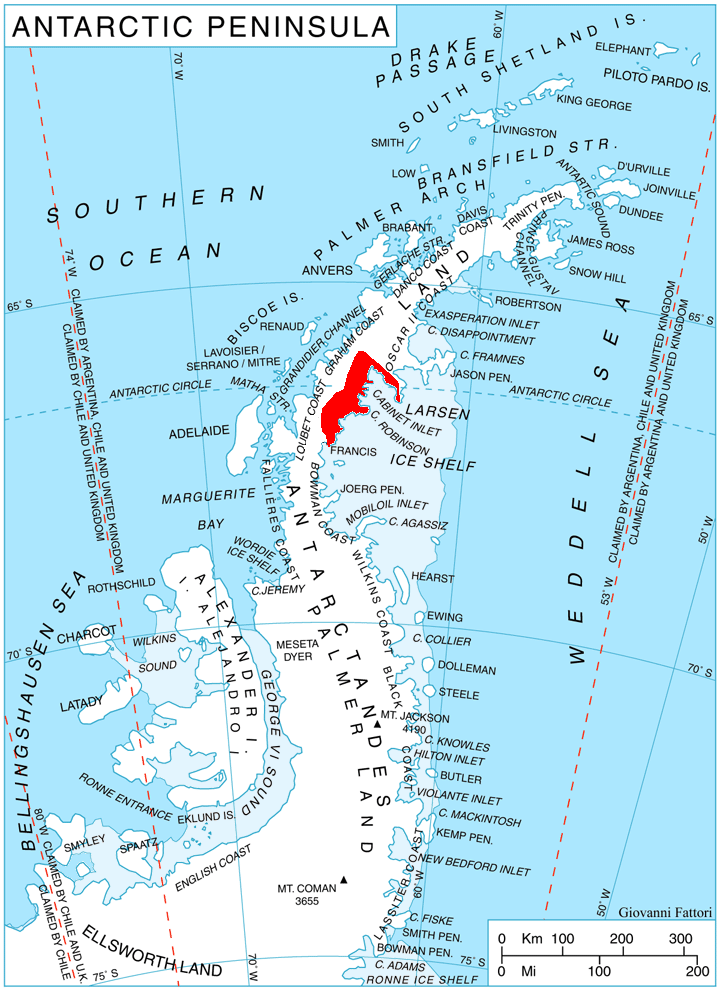
Location of Foyn Coast on Antarctic Peninsula.

Vologes Ridge (Bulgarian: хребет Вологес, ‘Hrebet Vologes’ \'hre-bet 'vo-lo-ges\) is the ice-covered flat-topped ridge extending 5.85 km in east-west direction, 1.55 km wide and rising to 1234 m at its west extremity, situated in central Sleipnir Glacier on Foyn Coast, Antarctic Peninsula.

The feature is named after the Thracian priest and military leader Vologes (1st century BC).

== Location ==
Vologes Ridge is centred at 66°28′25″S 64°09′10″W, which is 18.15 km west-southwest of Balder Point, 20.55 km northwest of Spur Point and 36.9 km east by north of Slessor Peak. British mapping in 1976.

== Maps ==
- British Antarctic Territory. Scale 1:200000 topographic map. DOS 610 Series, Sheet W 66 64. Directorate of Overseas Surveys, Tolworth, UK, 1976.
- Antarctic Digital Database (ADD). Scale 1:250000 topographic map of Antarctica. Scientific Committee on Antarctic Research (SCAR). Since 1993, regularly upgraded and updated.
