= Fricker Glacier =

Glacier in Antarctica

Fricker Glacier (67°3′S 65°0′W) is a glacier, 10 nautical miles (19 km) long, which lies close north of Tindal Bluff and Monnier Point and flows in a northeasterly direction into the southwest side of Mill Inlet, on the east coast of Graham Land, Antarctica. It was charted by the Falkland Islands Dependencies Survey (FIDS) and photographed from the air by the Ronne Antarctic Research Expedition in 1947, and was named by the FIDS for Karl Fricker, a German Antarctic historian.
