= Takev =

Takev may refer to:

- Takéo province, Cambodia, also spelled Takêv
- Takev Point, Antarctica
- Mihael Takev (1864–1920), Bulgarian politician, twice head of the Ministry of Interior (1908–1910, 1918)
