= Breitfuss Glacier =

Glacier in Antarctica

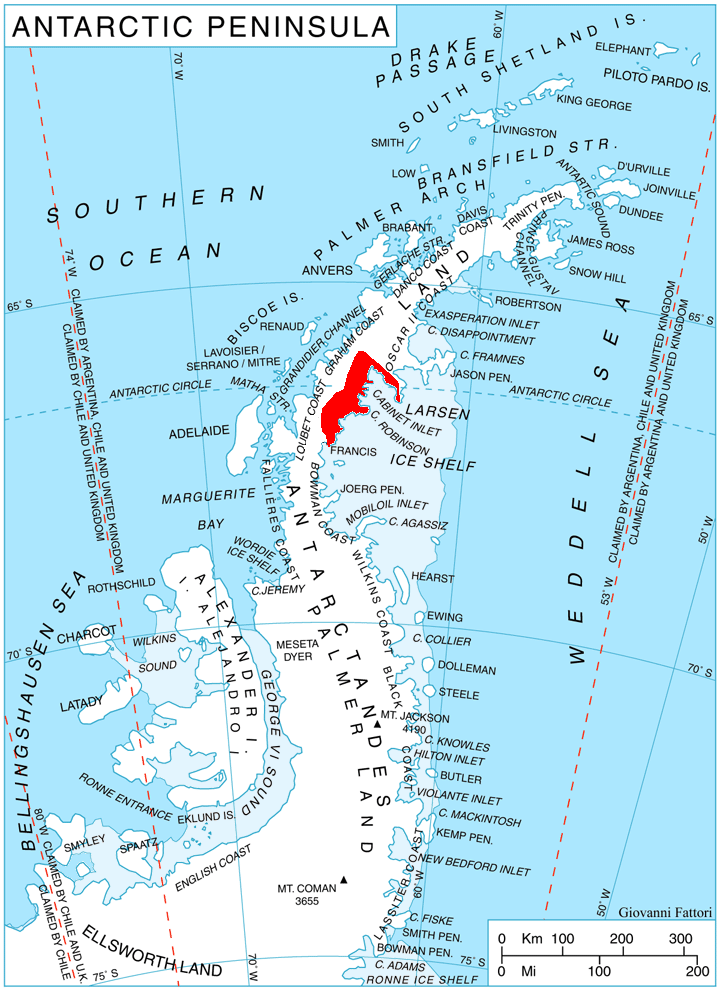
- Location of Foyn Coast on Antarctic Peninsula

- Location within Antarctica
- Location: Graham Land
- Coordinates: 66°58′00″S 64°52′00″W
- Length: 10 nmi (19 km; 12 mi)
- Thickness: unknown
- Highest elevation: 343 m (1,125 ft)
- Terminus: Mill Inlet
- Status: unknown

Breitfuss Glacier (66°58′S 64°52′W) is a glacier 10 nautical miles (19 km) long, which flows southeast from Avery Plateau into Mill Inlet to the west of Cape Chavanne, on the east coast of Graham Land. It was charted by the Falkland Islands Dependencies Survey (FIDS) and photographed from the air by the Ronne Antarctic Research Expedition in 1947. It was named by the FIDS for Leonid Breitfuss, a German polar explorer, historian, and author of many polar bibliographies.

== See also ==
- List of glaciers in the Antarctic
- Glaciology
