= Takev Point =

Headland in Antarctica

Takev Point Такев нос (Bulgarian)
- Headland
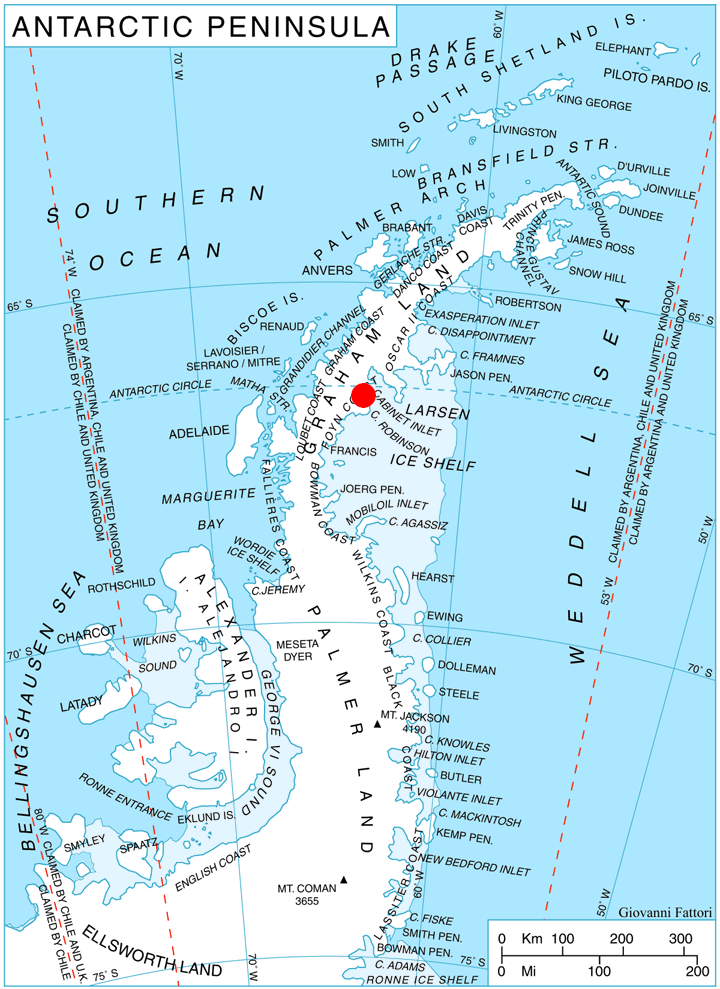
- Location of Heros Peninsula in Graham Land, Antarctic Peninsula.

- Coordinates: 66°36′17″S 63°54′04″W
- Location: Graham Land

Area
  - Total: Antarctica

Takev Point (Bulgarian: Такев нос, ‘Takev Nos’ \'ta-kev 'nos\) is the rocky point forming the south extremity of Heros Peninsula on the Foyn Coast, Antarctic Peninsula.

The feature is named after Vasiliy Takev, a participant in the 1996/97 Bulgarian Antarctic campaign, for his support for the Bulgarian Antarctic programme.

== Location ==
Takev Point is located 4.65 km west-southwest of Spur Point and 8.17 km east-northeast of Varad Point. It was mapped by British cartographers in 1974.

== Maps ==
- British Antarctic Territory: Graham Land. Scale 1:250000 topographic map. BAS 250 Series, Sheet SQ 19–20. London, 1974.
- Antarctic Digital Database (ADD). Scale 1:250000 topographic map of Antarctica. Scientific Committee on Antarctic Research (SCAR). Since 1993, regularly upgraded and updated.
