= Tindal Bluff =

Landform in Antarctica

Tindal Bluff (67°4′S 64°52′W) is a rocky headland rising to 800 m between the terminus of Fricker Glacier and Monnier Point on the east coast of Graham Land. This coastal area was photographed by several American expeditions: United States Antarctic Service (USAS), 1939–41; Ronne Antarctic Research Expedition (RARE), 1947–48; U.S. Navy photos, 1968. Mapped by Falkland Islands Dependencies Survey (FIDS), 1947–48. Named by United Kingdom Antarctic Place-Names Committee (UK-APC) for Ronald Tindal, General Assistant with the British Antarctic Survey (BAS) Larsen Ice Shelf party in 1963–64.
