= Cape Chavanne =

Bluff in Antarctica

Cape Chavanne (66°59′S 64°45′W) is a prominent, partly ice-free bluff, with a conspicuous elongated dome forming the southern tip, standing east of the mouth of Breitfuss Glacier at the head of Mill Inlet, on the east coast of Graham Land. It was charted by the Falkland Islands Dependencies Survey (FIDS) and photographed from the air by the Ronne Antarctic Research Expedition in 1947, and named by FIDS for Josef Chavanne, Austrian polar bibliographer.
