= Ojeda Beach =

Beach in Antarctica

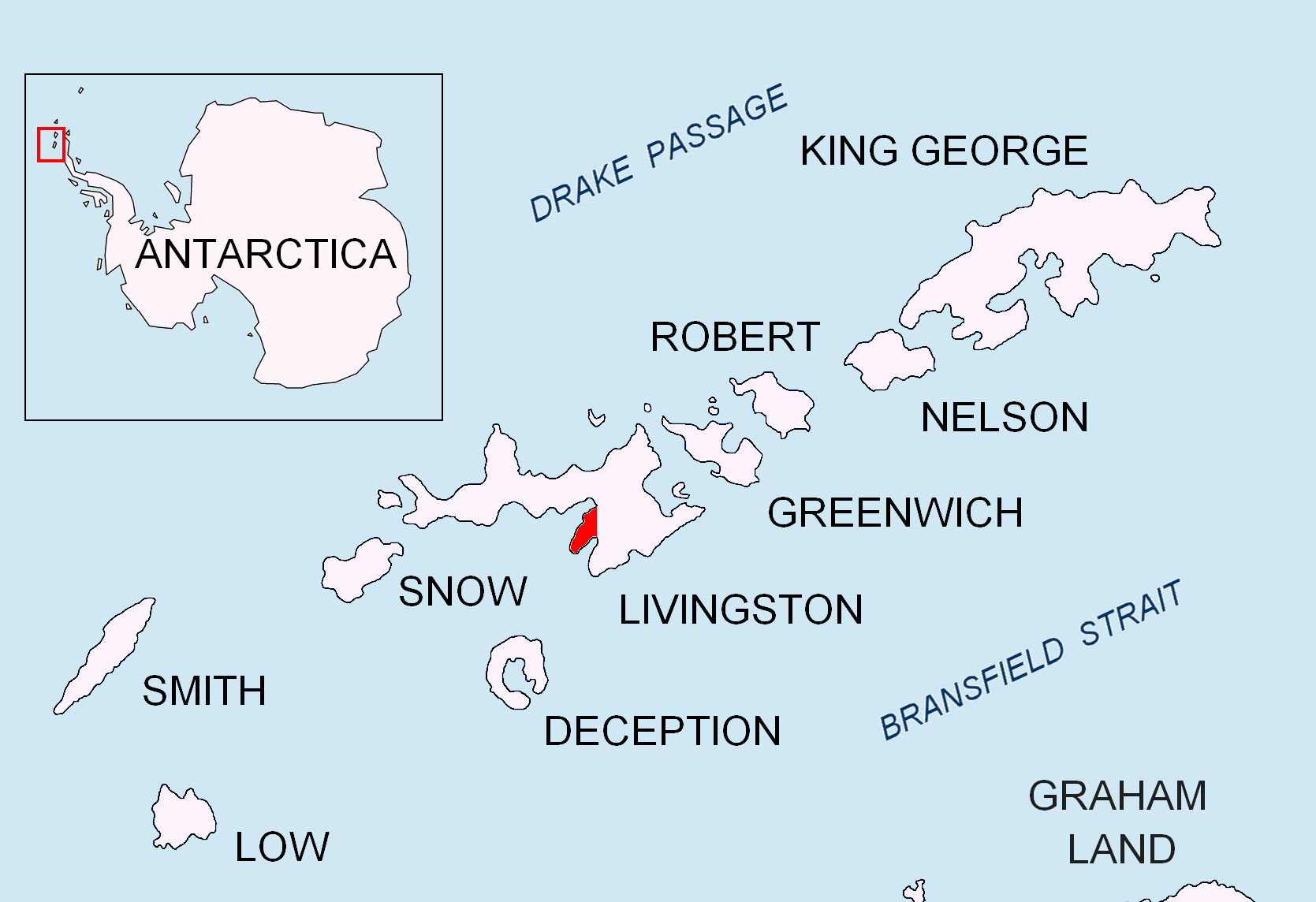
Location of Hurd Peninsula on Livingston Island in the South Shetland Islands.

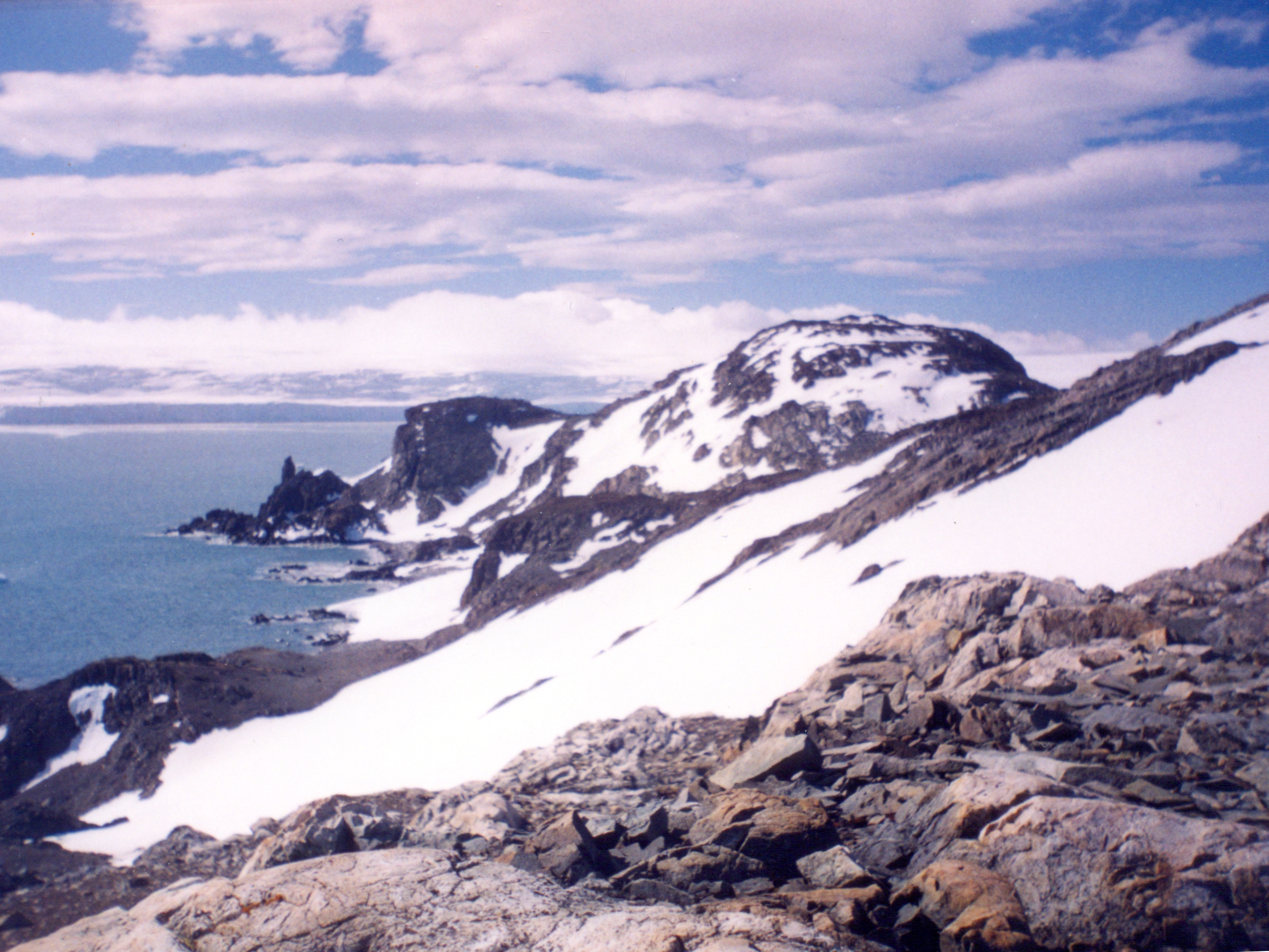
Ojeda Beach from the west slopes of Atlantic Club Ridge

Topographic map of Livingston Island and Smith Island

Ojeda Beach (Bulgarian: бряг Охеда, romanized: bryag Oheda, IPA: [ˈbrʲak oˈxɛdɐ]) is the ice-free beach extending 730 m on the southeast coast of South Bay, Hurd Peninsula on Livingston Island in the South Shetland Islands, Antarctica. It is bounded by Hespérides Point to the north, Hesperides Hill and Atlantic Club Ridge to the east, and Boeritsa Point to the south. The beach was possibly visited by early 19th century sealers frequenting the nearby Johnsons Dock.

The feature is named after Miguel Ángel Ojeda Cárdenes, manager of the Spanish Antarctic logistics and base commander at Juan Carlos I base during several seasons, for his support for the Bulgarian Antarctic programme.

== Location ==
Ojeda Beach is centred at 62°38′49″S 60°22′13″W.

== Maps ==
- Isla Livingston: Península Hurd. Mapa topográfico de escala 1:25000. Madrid: Servicio Geográfico del Ejército, 1991. (Map reproduced on p. 16 of the linked work)
- L.L. Ivanov. Livingston Island: Central-Eastern Region. Scale 1:25000 topographic map. Sofia: Antarctic Place-names Commission of Bulgaria, 1996.
- L.L. Ivanov et al. Antarctica: Livingston Island and Greenwich Island, South Shetland Islands. Scale 1:100000 topographic map. Sofia: Antarctic Place-names Commission of Bulgaria, 2005.
- L.L. Ivanov. Antarctica: Livingston Island and Greenwich, Robert, Snow and Smith Islands. Scale 1:120000 topographic map. Troyan: Manfred Wörner Foundation, 2009. ISBN 978-954-92032-6-4
- Antarctica, South Shetland Islands, Livingston Island: Bulgarian Antarctic Base. Sheets 1 and 2. Scale 1:2000 topographic map. Geodesy, Cartography and Cadastre Agency, 2016. (in Bulgarian)* Antarctic Digital Database (ADD). Scale 1:250000 topographic map of Antarctica. Scientific Committee on Antarctic Research (SCAR). Since 1993, regularly upgraded and updated.
- L.L. Ivanov. Antarctica: Livingston Island and Smith Island. Scale 1:100000 topographic map. Manfred Wörner Foundation, 2017. ISBN 978-619-90008-3-0
