= Cape Casey =

Coordinates: 66°22′S 63°35′W

Cape Casey is a conspicuous cape surmounted by a peak 755 metres (2,480 ft) high, marking the east end of the peninsula projecting into Cabinet Inlet immediately south of Bevin Glacier, on the east coast of Graham Land. It was charted by the Falkland Islands Dependencies Survey (FIDS) and photographed from the air by the Ronne Antarctic Research Expedition in 1947. It was named by the FIDS for Rt. Hon. Richard G. Casey, Minister of State and Australian member of the British War Cabinet.
