= Mount Odin (disambiguation) =

Mount Odin may refer to:

- Mount Odin, in Qikiqtaaluk, Nunavut, Canada
- Mount Odin (British Columbia), in Canada
- Mount Odin (Graham Land), in Graham Land, Antarctica
- Mount Odin (Victoria Land), in Victoria Land, Antarctica
