= Fitzmaurice Point =

Point in the Cabinet Inlet, Foyn Coast, Antarctica

Coordinates: 66°16′S 63°43′W

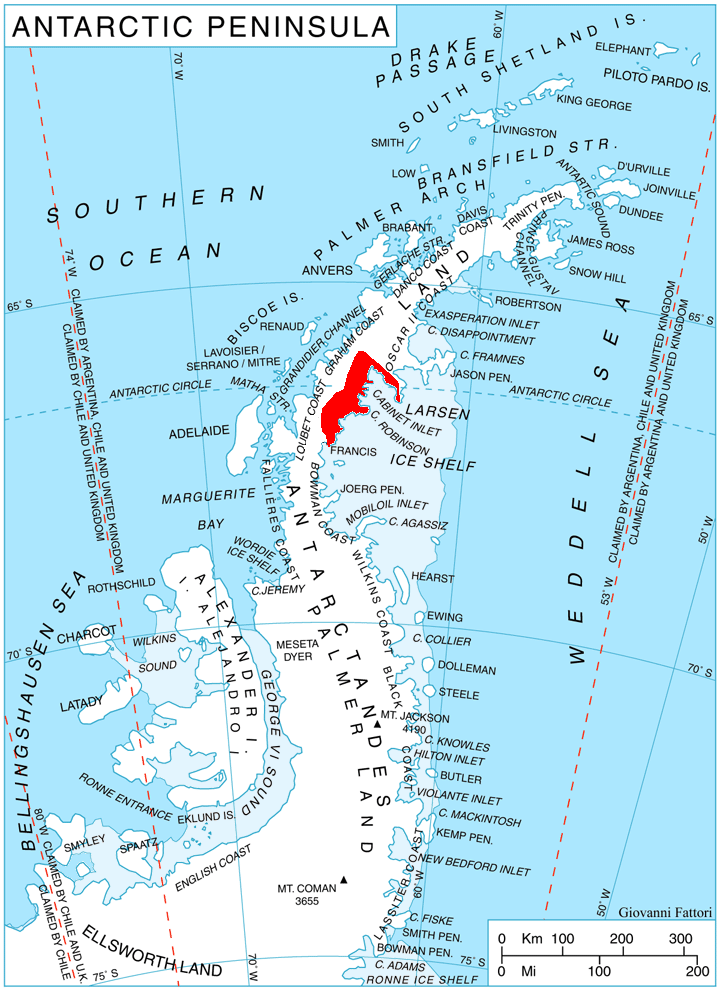
Location of Foyn Coast on Antarctic Peninsula.

Fitzmaurice Point is a point on the northwest side of Cabinet Inlet, Foyn Coast, Antarctica, between Attlee Glacier and Bevin Glacier. It was photographed from the air by the Ronne Antarctic Research Expedition and surveyed from the ground by the Falkland Islands Dependencies Survey in December 1947. It was named in 1985 by the UK Antarctic Place-Names Committee (UK-APC) after Sir Gerald G. Fitzmaurice, Legal Advisor at the Foreign Office, 1953–60 (Second Legal Advisor, 1945–53), who served some of the Cabinet Ministers commemorated in this area. Fitzmaurice was chairman of the UK-APC, 1952–60.
