= Roumiana Metcheva =

Bulgarian Antarctic researcher

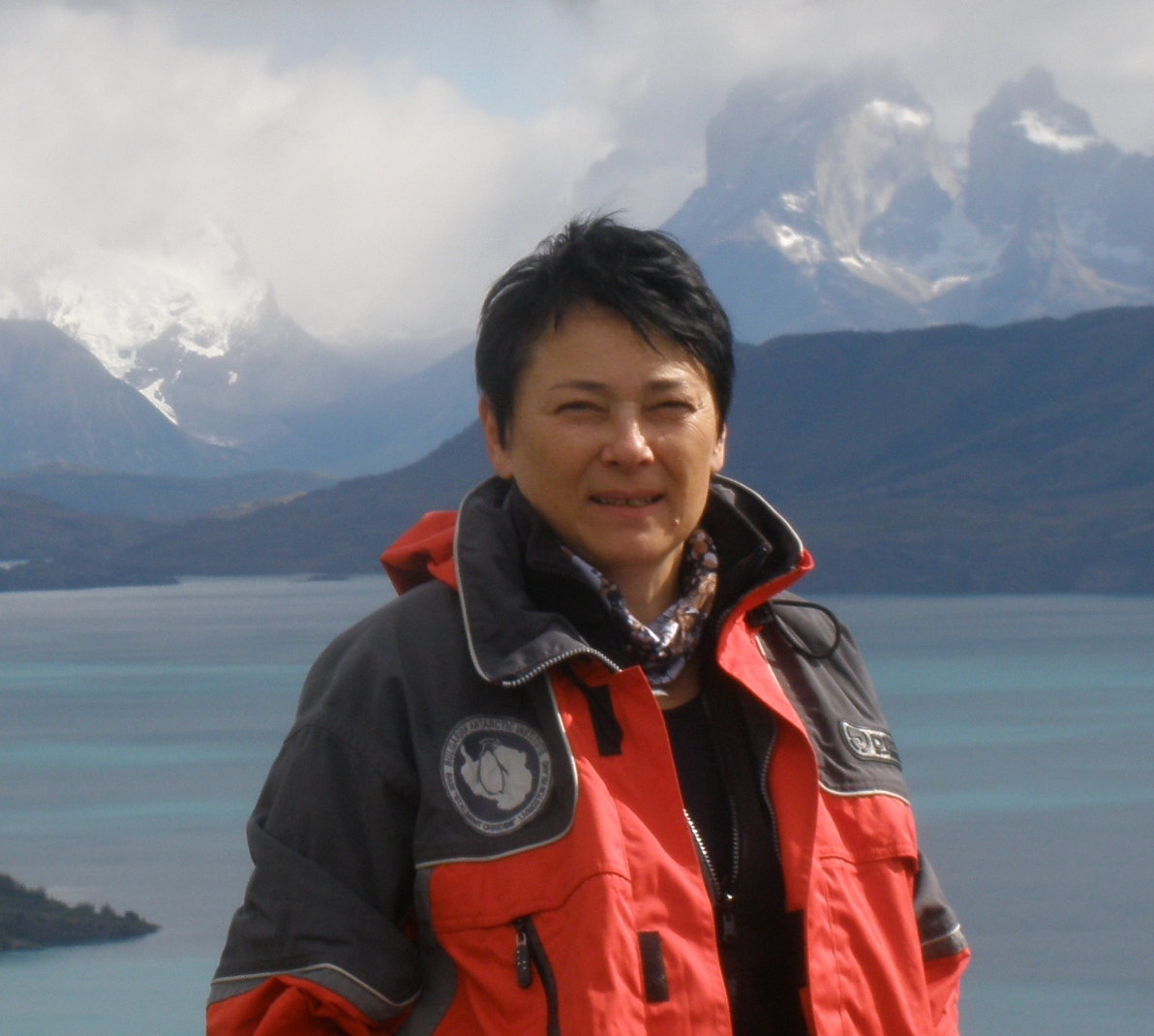
- Born: July 13, 1950
- Education: BSc Sofia University; PhD Jagiellonian University
- Scientific career
- Fields: Ecotoxicology
- Workplaces: Bulgarian Academy of Sciences; Bulgarian Antarctic Institute
- Website: www.roumiana-mecheva.net

Roumiana Panayotova Metcheva (Bulgarian: Румяна Панайотова Мечева) is a Bulgarian Antarctic researcher, best known for her work on ecotoxicology and biodiversity protection in the Antarctic. She is the Head of Department of Ecosystem Research, Environmental Risk Assessment and Conservation Biology at the Bulgarian Academy of Sciences. Mount Mecheva was named after Metcheva for recognition of her work.

== Early life and education ==
Metcheva was born on July 13, 1950, in Sofia, Bulgaria. She graduated with a Master in Biology from the Faculty of Biology at the Sofia University (St. Kliment Ohridski) in October 1975. She completed her D.Sc. in Biology, from the Institute of biology and environment at Jagiellonian University, Poland in 1980, researching the bioenergetics and energy flow in Strix aluco (Tawny owl) populations.

== Career and impact ==
Metcheva was a scientific researcher at the Institute of Zoology, Bulgarian Academy of Sciences from 1980 – 1993. She was then appointed as the chief of the ‘Physiological Ecology’ laboratory at the Institute of Zoology at the Bulgarian Academy of Sciences in 1993 and at present works at the Institute of Biodiversity and Ecosystem Research (IBER). She is now Head of Department of Ecosystem Research, Environmental Risk Assessment and Conservation Biology, as well as Chairman of the General Assembly of Researchers at the Institute of Biodiversity and Ecosystem Research at the Bulgarian Academy of Sciences.

Metcheva was a Member of Bulgarian Antarctic Expeditions from 1999 – 2010 and has been a member of the Bulgarian Antarctic Institute since 2000. Her research has focused on Antarctic penguins and fishes with a particular focus on toxin accumulation in the food chain.

== Awards and honours ==
Mount Mecheva was named after Metcheva for recognition of her work at St Kilment Ohridski Base in 1999/2000 and subsequent seasons.
