= Frigga Peak =

Mountain in Antarctica

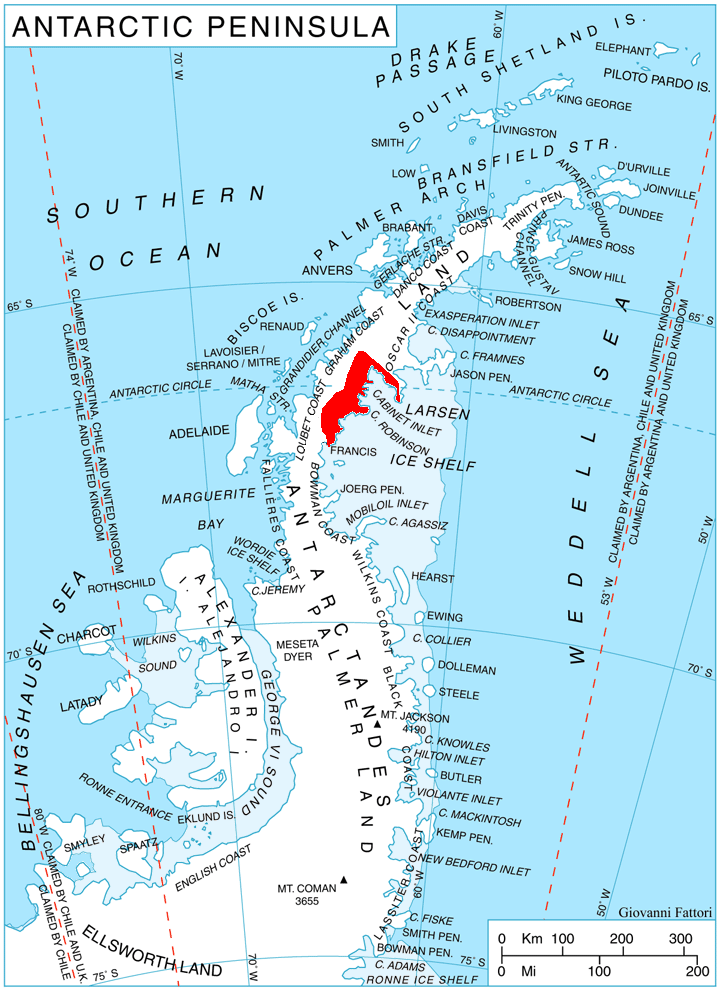
Location of Foyn Coast on Antarctic Peninsula.

Frigga Peak (66°25′S 64°0′W) is a peak, 1,570 metres (5,150 ft) high, which stands at the south side of Anderson Glacier on the east coast of Graham Land, Antarctica. It was charted by the Falkland Islands Dependencies Survey (FIDS) and photographed from the air by the Ronne Antarctic Research Expedition in 1947. The FIDS named it after the Norse goddess Frigga, the "cloud spinner," because clouds were observed to form on the summit of this peak earlier than on any other feature in this vicinity. Nearby Mount Odin was named in association, since Odin is Frigga's wife in Norse mythology.
