= Cape Robinson =

Location in Antarctica

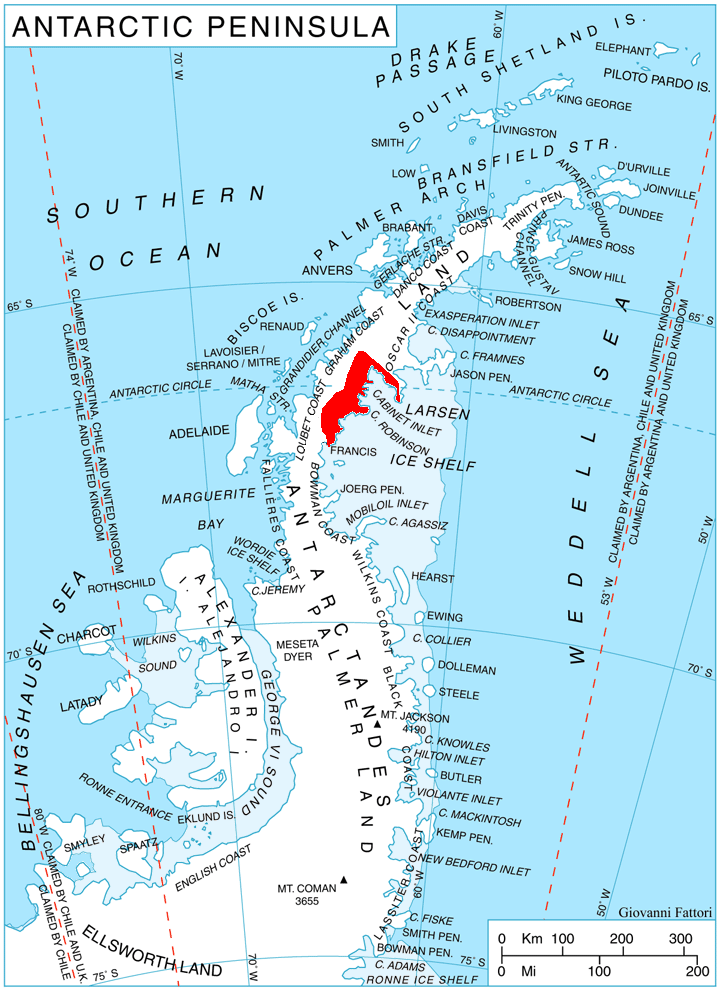
Location of Foyn Coast on Antarctic Peninsula.

Cape Robinson (66°52′S 63°43′W) is a cape marking the east end of Cole Peninsula, between Cabinet and Mill Inlets on Foyn Coast, Graham Land. Sir Hubert Wilkins, while on his flight of December 20, 1928 along this coast, named an island for W.S. Robinson of London and Australia, which he reported to lie in about 67°20′S 61°40′W. Absence of photographs of this island by Wilkins has prevented its positive reidentification. For this reason, and for the sake of historical continuity, it is recommended that the east end of the peninsula here described be given the name Cape Robinson. This cape was charted by the Falkland Islands Dependencies Survey (FIDS) and photographed from the air by the Ronne Antarctic Research Expedition (RARE) in 1947.
