= Anderson Glacier (Antarctica) =

Glacier in Antarctica

Aleksiev Glacier
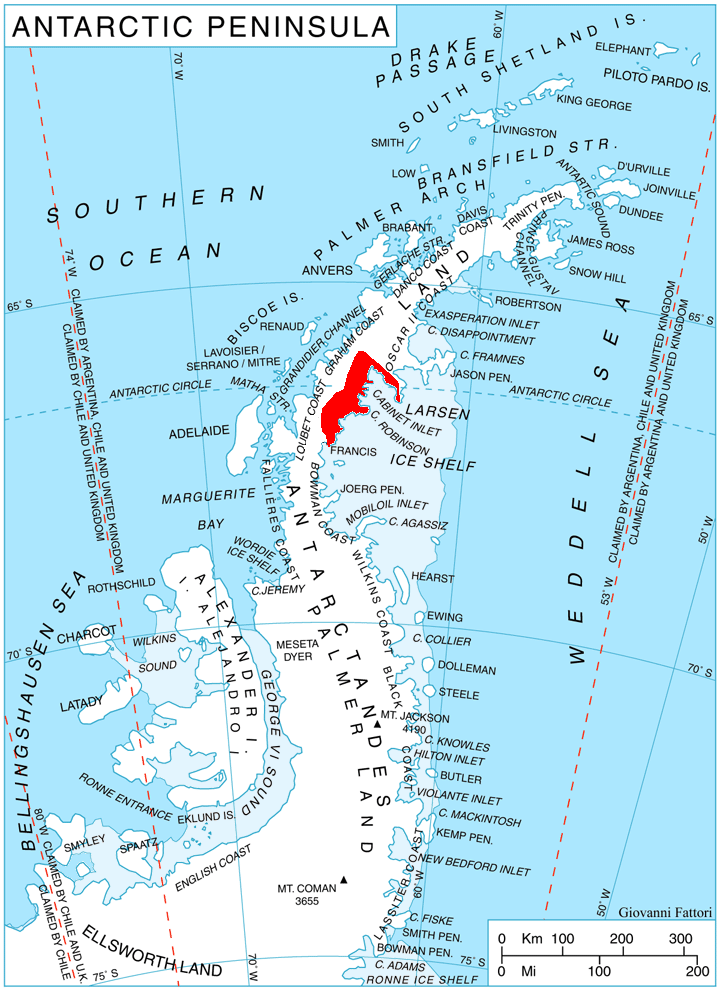
- Location of Foyn Coast on the Antarctic Peninsula

- Location within Antarctica
- Location: Graham Land
- Coordinates: 66°24′00″S 63°55′00″W
- Length: 12 nmi (22 km; 14 mi)
- Thickness: unknown
- Highest elevation: 213 m (699 ft)
- Terminus: Cabinet Inlet
- Status: unknown

Anderson Glacier is a heavily crevassed glacier 12 nautical miles (22 km) long, flowing southeast into Cabinet Inlet between Cape Casey and Balder Point, on the east coast of Graham Land.

== History ==
Anderson Glacier was charted by the Falkland Islands Dependencies Survey (FIDS) and photographed from the air by the Ronne Antarctic Research Expedition in December 1947. It was named by FIDS for Sir John Anderson, M.P., Lord President of the Council and member of the British War Cabinet.

== See also ==
- List of glaciers in the Antarctic
- Glaciology
