= Belchin Rock =

Rock off of Livingston Island, Antarctica

- Location of Livingston Island in the South Shetland Islands.

- Location within Antarctica Location within Antarctic Peninsula

Geography
- Location: Antarctica
- Coordinates: 62°31′37″S 60°24′26″W
- Archipelago: South Shetland Islands

Administration
- Administered under the Antarctic Treaty System

Demographics
- Population: Uninhabited

Belchin Rock (Bulgarian: скала Белчин, ‘Skala Belchin’ ska-'la bel-'chin) is a rock off the north coast of Livingston Island in the South Shetland Islands, Antarctica situated in Hero Bay 2.2 km (1.4 mi) northeast of Siddins Point and 2 km (1.2 mi) north of Melta Point.

The rock is named after the settlement of Belchin in western Bulgaria.

== Location ==
Belchin Rock is located at 62°31′37″S 60°24′26″W. Bulgarian mapping in 2009 and 2010.

== See also ==
- Composite Gazetteer of Antarctica
- List of Antarctic islands south of 60° S
- Scientific Committee on Antarctic Research
- Territorial claims in Antarctica

== Map ==
- L.L. Ivanov. Antarctica: Livingston Island and Greenwich, Robert, Snow and Smith Islands. Scale 1:120000 topographic map. Troyan: Manfred Wörner Foundation, 2009. ISBN 978-954-92032-6-4
