= Ballestilla Reef =

Antarctic reef

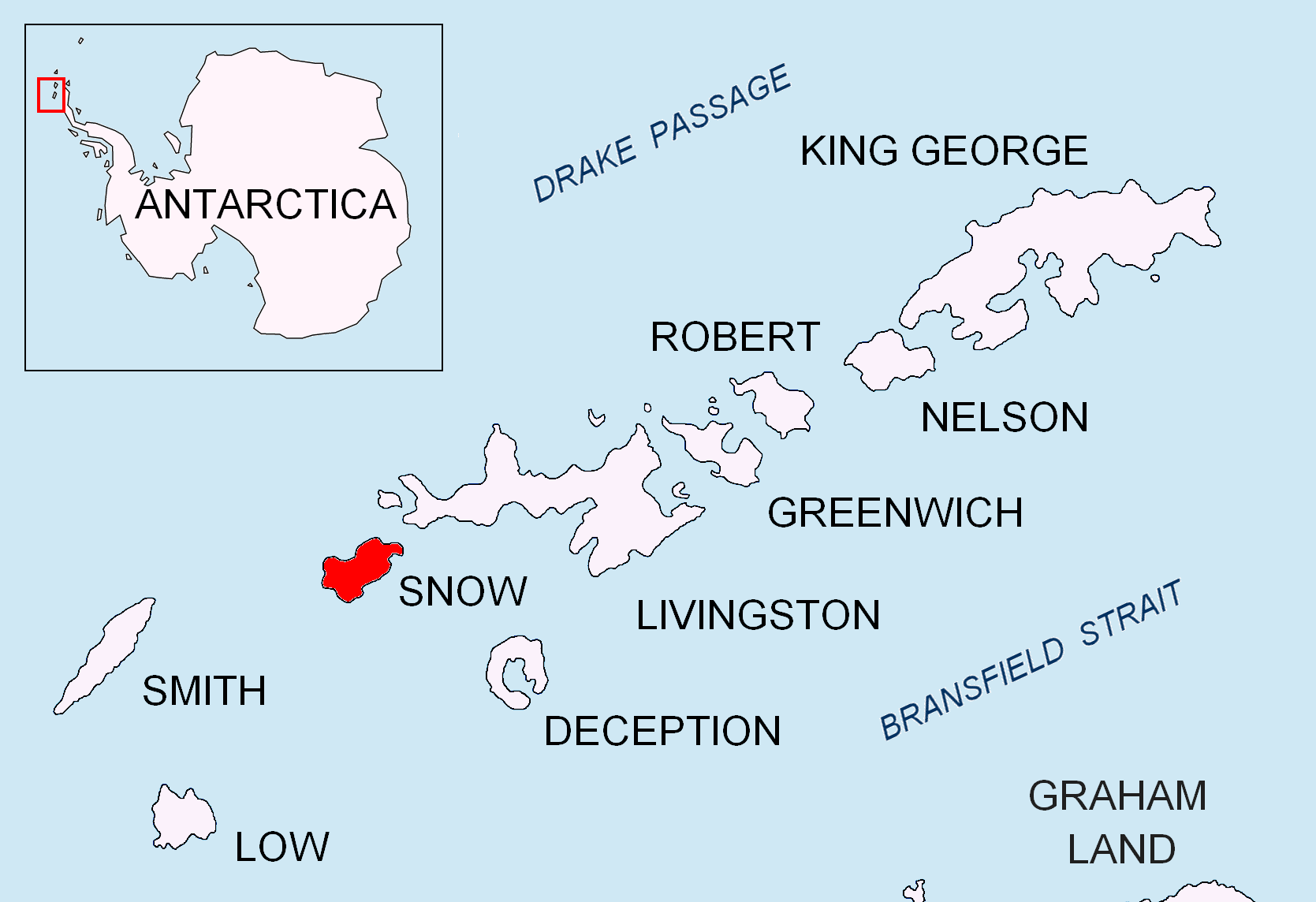
- Location of Snow Island in the South Shetland Islands

- Location within Antarctica Location within South Shetland Islands

Geography
- Location: Antarctica
- Coordinates: 62°44′05″S 61°31′46″W
- Archipelago: South Shetland Islands
- Area: 0.38 ha (0.94 acres)
- Length: 160 m (520 ft)
- Width: 40 m (130 ft)

Administration
- Administered under the Antarctic Treaty

Demographics
- Population: uninhabited

Topographic map of Livingston, Greenwich, Robert, Snow and Smith Islands

Ballestilla Reef (Bulgarian: риф Балестиля, romanized: rif Ballestilla, IPA: [ˈrif bɐlɛˈstilʲɐ]) is a 160m long (in the southeast-northwest direction) by 40m wide flat and rocky low-tide elevation off the northwest coast of Snow Island in the South Shetland Islands, Antarctica. Its surface area is 0.38 ha. The vicinity was visited by early 19th century sealers.

The feature is named after the geodetic instrument ballestilla, also known as Jacob's staff or cross-staff; in association with other names in the area deriving from the early development or use of geodetic instruments and methods.

== Location ==
Ballestilla Reef is located at 62°44′05″S 61°31′46″W, which is 2.25 km northwest of Byewater Point, determined by Bulgarian mapping in 2009.

== See also ==
- List of Antarctic and subantarctic islands

== Maps ==
- South Shetland Islands. Scale 1:200000 topographic map. DOS 610 Sheet W 62 60. Tolworth, UK, 1968
- L. Ivanov. Antarctica: Livingston Island and Greenwich, Robert, Snow and Smith Islands. Scale 1:120000 topographic map. Troyan: Manfred Wörner Foundation, 2010. ISBN 978-954-92032-9-5 (First edition 2009. ISBN 978-954-92032-6-4)
- Antarctic Digital Database (ADD). Scale 1:250000 topographic map of Antarctica. Scientific Committee on Antarctic Research (SCAR). Since 1993, regularly upgraded and updated
