= Gluhar =

Gluhar Глухар
- Village
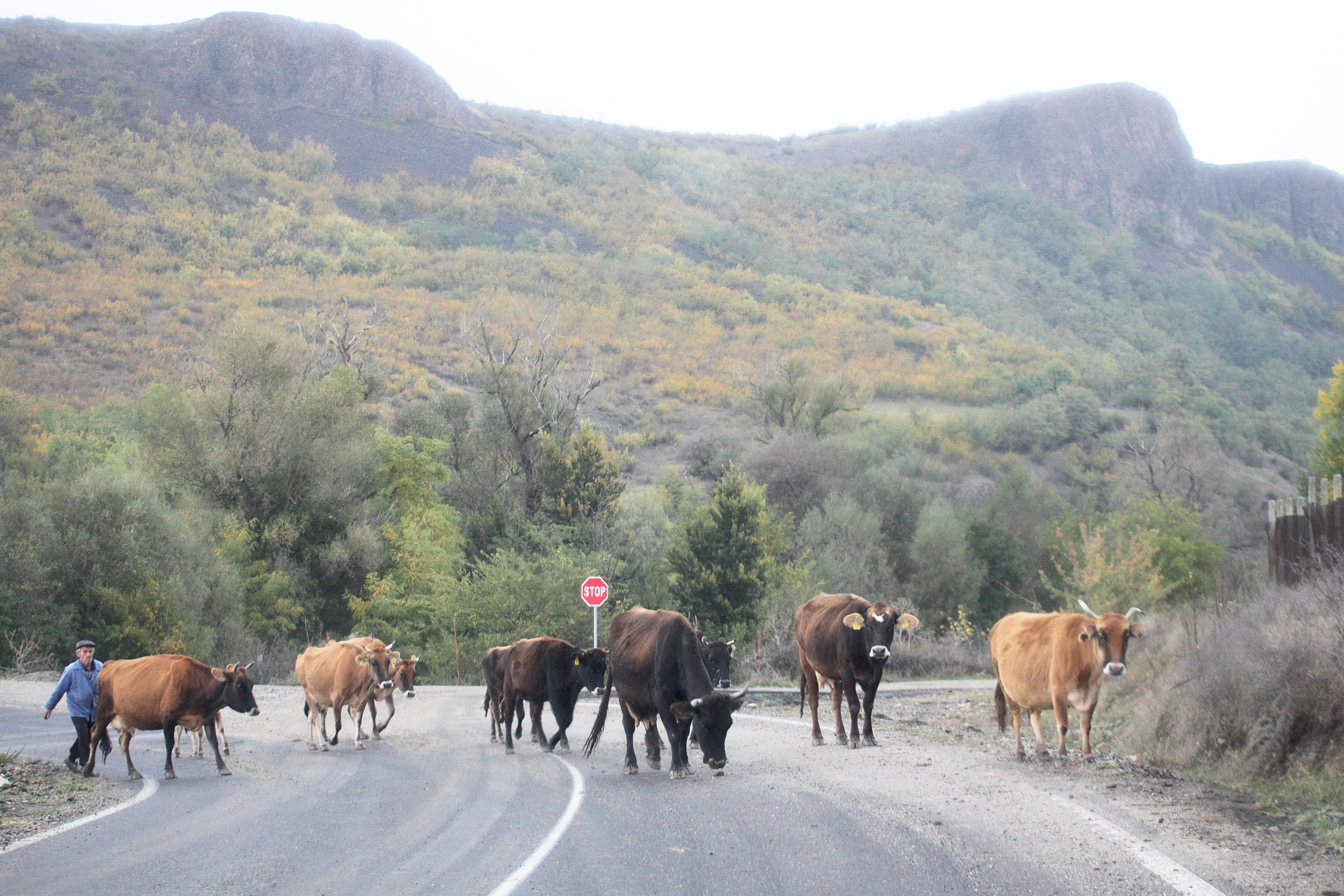
- A view of Gluhar

- Location within Bulgaria
- Coordinates: 41.6000°N 25.4000°E
- Country: Bulgaria
- Province: Kardzhali Province
- Municipality: Kardzhali
- Time zone: UTC+2 (EET)
  - Summer (DST): UTC+3 (EEST)

Gluhar is a village in Kardzhali Municipality, Kardzhali Province, southern Bulgaria.
