= Baktriana Reef =

Antarctic reef

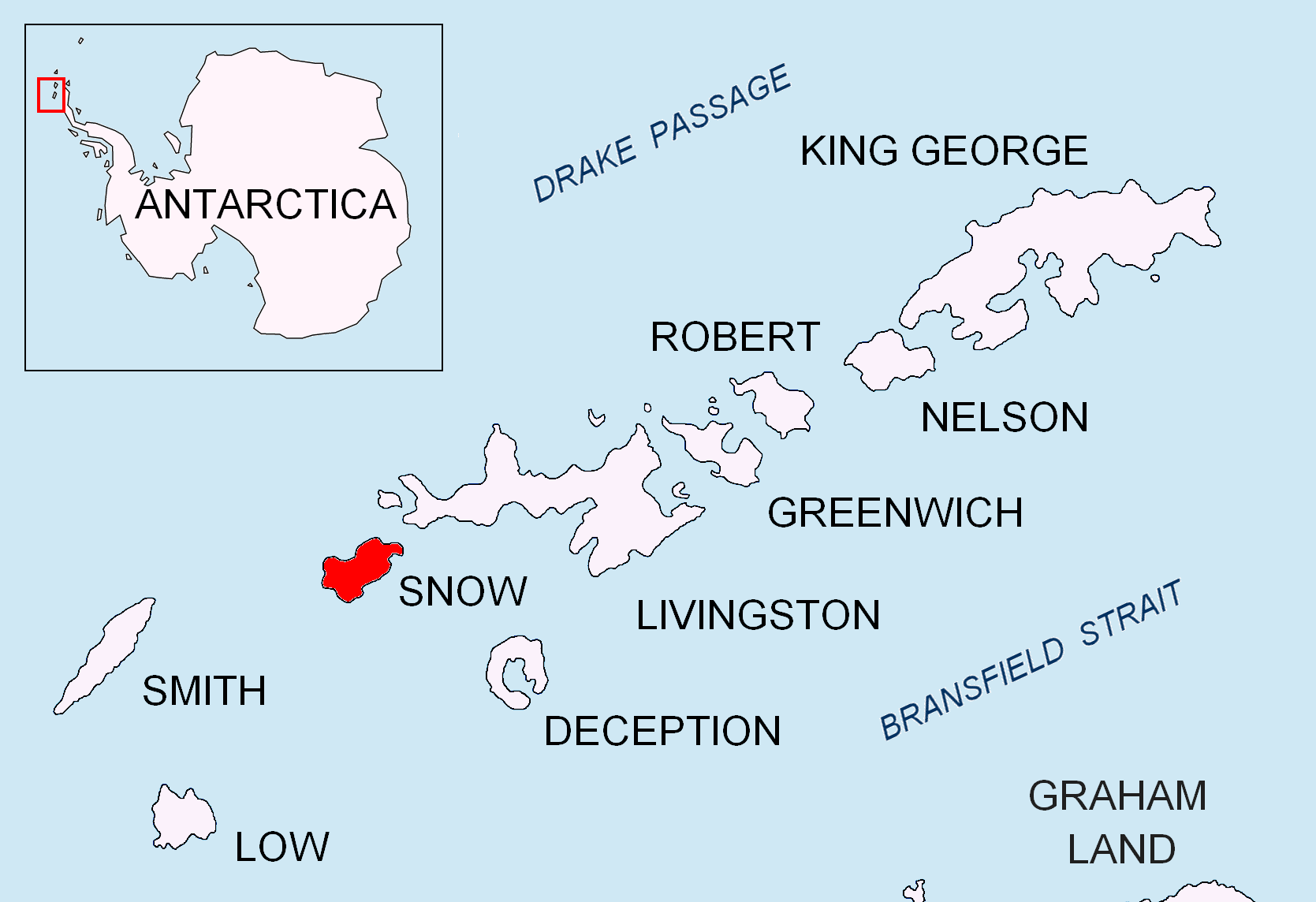
- Location of Snow Island in the South Shetland Islands

- Location within Antarctica Location within South Shetland Islands

Geography
- Location: Antarctica
- Coordinates: 62°45′51.5″S 61°33′38″W
- Archipelago: South Shetland Islands
- Area: 0.33 ha (0.82 acres)
- Length: 360 m (1180 ft)
- Width: 40 m (130 ft)

Administration
- Administered under the Antarctic Treaty

Demographics
- Population: uninhabited

Topographic map of Livingston, Greenwich, Robert, Snow and Smith Islands

Baktriana Reef (Bulgarian: риф Бактриана, romanized: rif Baktriana, IPA: [ˈrif bɐktriˈanɐ]) is the 360 m long in east-west direction and 40 m wide flat and rocky low-tide elevation off the west coast of Snow Island in the South Shetland Islands, Antarctica. Its surface area is 0.33 ha. The vicinity was visited by early 19th century sealers.

The feature is so named because of its shape supposedly resembling the two humps of a Bactrian camel (‘baktriana’ in Bulgarian).

== Location ==
Baktriana Reef lies in Boyd Strait at 62°45′51.5″S 61°33′38″W, which is 2.96 km southwest of Byewater Point, 1.8 km northwest of Esteverena Point and 2.7 km north-northeast of Castle Rock. British mapping in 1968.

== See also ==
- List of Antarctic and subantarctic islands

== Maps ==
- South Shetland Islands. Scale 1:200000 topographic map. DOS 610 Sheet W 62 60. Tolworth, UK, 1968
- L. Ivanov. Antarctica: Livingston Island and Greenwich, Robert, Snow and Smith Islands. Scale 1:120000 topographic map. Troyan: Manfred Wörner Foundation, 2010. ISBN 978-954-92032-9-5 (First edition 2009. ISBN 978-954-92032-6-4)
- Antarctic Digital Database (ADD). Scale 1:250000 topographic map of Antarctica. Scientific Committee on Antarctic Research (SCAR). Since 1993, regularly upgraded and updated
