= Bris Rock =

Rock in Antarctica

- Location within South Shetland Islands Location within Antarctica

Geography
- Location: Antarctica
- Coordinates: 62°15′01.5″S 59°10′12″W
- Archipelago: South Shetland Islands
- Area: 0.21 ha (0.52 acres)
- Length: 70 m (230 ft)
- Width: 60 m (200 ft)

Administration
- Administered under the Antarctic Treaty

Demographics
- Population: uninhabited

Bris Rock (Bulgarian: скала Брис, romanized: skala Bris, IPA: [skɐˈla ˈbris]) is the rock off the northwest coast of Nelson Island in the South Shetland Islands, Antarctica extending 70 m in south–north direction and 60 m in west–east direction. Its surface area is 0.21 ha. The vicinity was visited by early 19th century sealers.

The feature is named after the Bris sextant invented by the Swedish sailor and writer Sven Yrvind; in association with other names in the area deriving from the early development or use of geodetic instruments and methods.

== Location ==
Bris Rock is located at 62°15′01.5″S 59°10′12″W, which is 1.41 km west-northwest of Retamales Point, 2 km northeast of Smilets Point and 2.1 km southwest of Withem Island. British mapping in 1968.

== See also ==
- List of Antarctic and subantarctic islands

== Maps ==
- Livingston Island to King George Island. Scale 1:200000. Admiralty Nautical Chart 1776. Taunton: UK Hydrographic Office, 1968.
- South Shetland Islands. Scale 1:200000 topographic map No. 3373. DOS 610 - W 62 58. Tolworth, UK, 1968.
- Antarctic Digital Database (ADD). Scale 1:250000 topographic map of Antarctica. Scientific Committee on Antarctic Research (SCAR). Since 1993, regularly upgraded and updated.
