= Marla Glacier =

Glacier in Antarctica

- Location within Antarctica
- Location: Trinity Peninsula
- Coordinates: 64°00′30″S 58°53′00″W
- Length: 8 nmi (15 km; 9 mi)
- Width: 1 nmi (2 km; 1 mi)
- Terminus: Prince Gustav Channel

Marla Glacier (64°00′30″S 58°53′00″W) is a glacier 8 nautical miles (15 km; 9.2 mi) long and 1 nautical mile (1.9 km; 1.2 mi) wide on the northeast side of Detroit Plateau on the southern Trinity Peninsula in Graham Land, Antarctica.

== Location ==
Trinity Peninsula, Antarctic Peninsula. Marla Glacier in east of south coast

Marla Glacier is in Graham Land on the southeast coast of the Trinity Peninsula, which forms the tip of the Antarctic Peninsula. It is situated south of Aitkenhead Glacier and north of Diplock Glacier. It drains southeastwards along the east slopes of Povien Peak, then turns east between Mount Roberts and Bezenšek Spur, and flows into Prince Gustav Channel in Weddell Sea.

== Name ==
Marla Glacier glacier is named after Marla River in Northern Bulgaria.

== Nearby features ==
=== Simpson Nunatak ===
63°58′S 58°54′W. A nunatak, 1,165 metres (3,822 ft) high, rising 2.5 nautical miles (4.6 km; 2.9 mi) northwest of Mount Roberts, on the south margin of Aitkenhead Glacier. Named by the UK Antarctic Place-Names Committee (UK-APC) for Hugh W. Simpson of the Falkland Islands Dependencies Survey (FIDS), a member of the Detroit Plateau reconnaissance party from Hope Bay in 1957.

=== Povien Peak ===
63°58′56″S 58°58′12″W. An ice-covered peak rising to 1,455 metres (4,774 ft) high in the northeast foothills of Detroit Plateau. Situated between the upper courses of Marla and Diplock Glaciers, 9.48 kilometres (5.89 mi) southwest of Mancho Buttress and, 7.3 kilometres (4.5 mi) west-northwest of Mount Roberts. Bezenšek Spur projects east-southeastwards from the peak. Named after the settlement of Povien in Southern Bulgaria.

=== Bezenšek Spur ===
64°01′15″S 58°52′00″W. A 5.5 kilometres (3.4 mi) long and 665 metres (2,182 ft) high wide rocky ridge rising to 900 metres (3,000 ft) high in the northeast foothills of Detroit Plateau. It projects from the southeast side of Povien Peak eastwards between Marla Glacier and Diplock Glacier. Named after the Slovene-Bulgarian linguist Anton Bezenšek (1854-1915) who developed the stenographic system for the Bulgarian language.

== Sources ==
- Alberts, Fred G., ed. (1995), Geographic Names of the Antarctic (PDF) (2 ed.), United States Board on Geographic Names This article incorporates public domain material from websites or documents of the United States Board on Geographic Names.

REMA Explorer
The Reference Elevation Model of Antarctica (REMA) gives ice surface measurements of most of the continent. When a feature is ice-covered, the ice surface will differ from the underlying rock surface and will change over time. To see ice surface contours and elevation of a feature as of the last REMA update,
- Open the Antarctic REMA Explorer
- Enter the feature's coordinates in the box at the top left that says "Find address or place", then press enter
  The coordinates should be in DMS format, e.g. 65°05'03"S 64°01'02"W. If you only have degrees and minutes, you may not be able to locate the feature.
- Hover over the icons at the left of the screen
- Find "Hillshade" and click on that
  In the bottom right of the screen, set "Shading Factor" to 0 to get a clearer image
- Find "Contour" and click on that
  In the "Contour properties" box, select Contour Interval = 1m
  You can zoom in and out to see the ice surface contours of the feature and nearby features
- Find "Identify" and click on that
  Click the point where the contour lines seem to indicate the top of the feature
  The "Identify" box will appear to the top left. The Orthometric height is the elevation of the ice surface of the feature at this point.

- Antarctic REMA Explorer (Digital Elevation Models created by the Polar Geospatial Center from Maxar imagery), Polar Geospatial Center, University of Minnesota, 2019
- "Bezenšek Spur", Composite Gazetteer of Antarctica, Scientific Committee on Antarctic Research
- Graham Land and South Shetland Islands, BAS: British Antarctic Survey, 2005
- "Marla Glacier", Composite Gazetteer of Antarctica, Scientific Committee on Antarctic Research
- "Povien Peak", Composite Gazetteer of Antarctica, Scientific Committee on Antarctic Research
- Trinity Peninsula (PDF) (Scale 1:250000 topographic map No. 5697), Institut für Angewandte Geodäsie and British Antarctic Survey, 1996, archived from the original (PDF) on 23 September 2015

This article incorporates public domain material from websites or documents of the United States Geological Survey.

This article includes information from the Antarctic Place-names Commission of Bulgaria which is used with permission.
