= Sleipnir Glacier =

Glacier in Graham Land, Antarctica

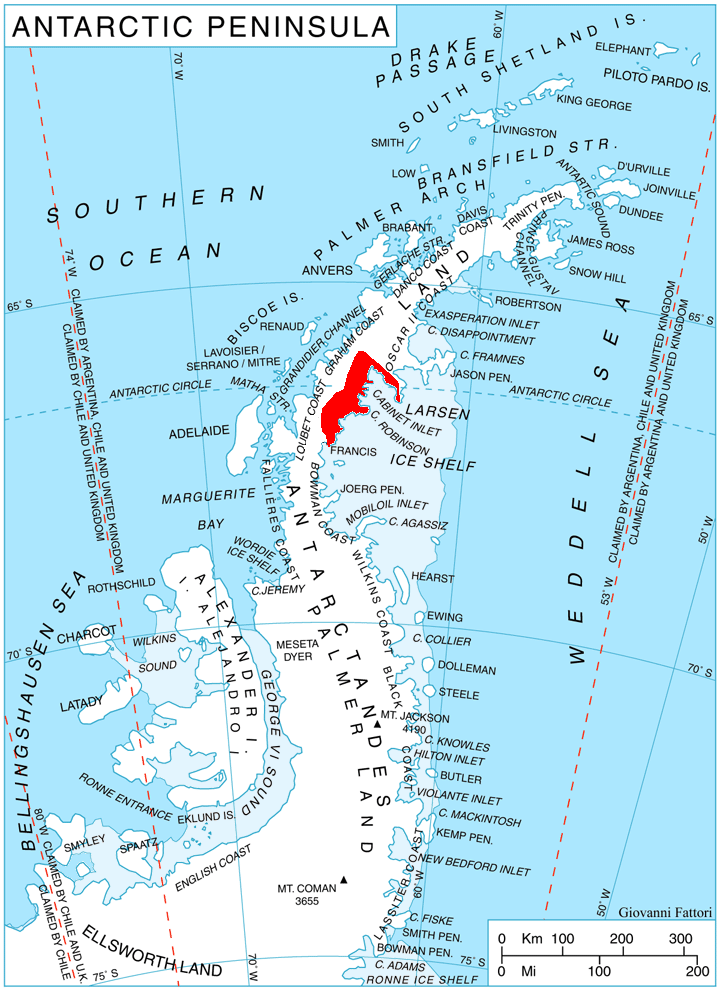
Location of Foyn Coast on Antarctic Peninsula.

Sleipnir Glacier (66°29′S 63°59′W) is a glacier 10 nautical miles (18 km) long, flowing into the west side of Cabinet Inlet between Balder and Spur Points, on the east coast of Graham Land, Antarctica. The Vologes Ridge is in the central portion of the glacier.

The feature was charted in 1947 by the Falkland Islands Dependencies Survey (FIDS), who named it after the horse of the mythological Norse god Odin. It was photographed from the air during 1947 by the Ronne Antarctic Research Expedition (RARE) under Ronne.

== Maps ==
- British Antarctic Territory: Graham Land. Scale 1:250000 topographic map. BAS 250 Series, Sheet SQ 19-20. London, 1974.
- British Antarctic Territory. Scale 1:200000 topographic map. DOS 610 Series, Sheet W 66 64. Directorate of Overseas Surveys, Tolworth, UK, 1976.
- Antarctic Digital Database (ADD). Scale 1:250000 topographic map of Antarctica. Scientific Committee on Antarctic Research (SCAR), 1993–2016.
