= Bevin Glacier =

Glacier in Antarctica

- Location within Antarctica
- Location: Graham Land
- Coordinates: 66°17′00″S 63°47′00″W
- Length: 5 nmi (9 km; 6 mi)
- Thickness: unknown
- Highest elevation: 177 m (581 ft)
- Terminus: Cabinet Inlet
- Status: unknown

Bevin Glacier (66°17′S 63°47′W) is a glacier 5 nautical miles (9 km) long, which flows east from the plateau escarpment on the east side of Graham Land into the northwest end of Cabinet Inlet between Attlee Glacier and Anderson Glacier. During December 1947 it was charted by the Falkland Islands Dependencies Survey (FIDS) and photographed from the air by the Ronne Antarctic Research Expedition. It was named by the FIDS for Rt. Hon. Ernest Bevin, M.P., British Minister of Labour and National Service and member of the War Cabinet.

== See also ==
- List of glaciers in the Antarctic
- Glaciology
