= Monnier Point =

Point in Graham Land, Antarctica

Monnier Point (67°6′S 64°45′W) is a low, mainly ice-covered point forming the south side of the entrance to Mill Inlet, on the east coast of Graham Land, Antarctica. During 1947 it was photographed from the air by the Ronne Antarctic Research Expedition under Finn Ronne, and charted from the ground by the Falkland Islands Dependencies Survey (FIDS). it was named by the FIDS for the Austrian polar bibliographer Franz R.V. Le Monnier.
