= Varad Point =

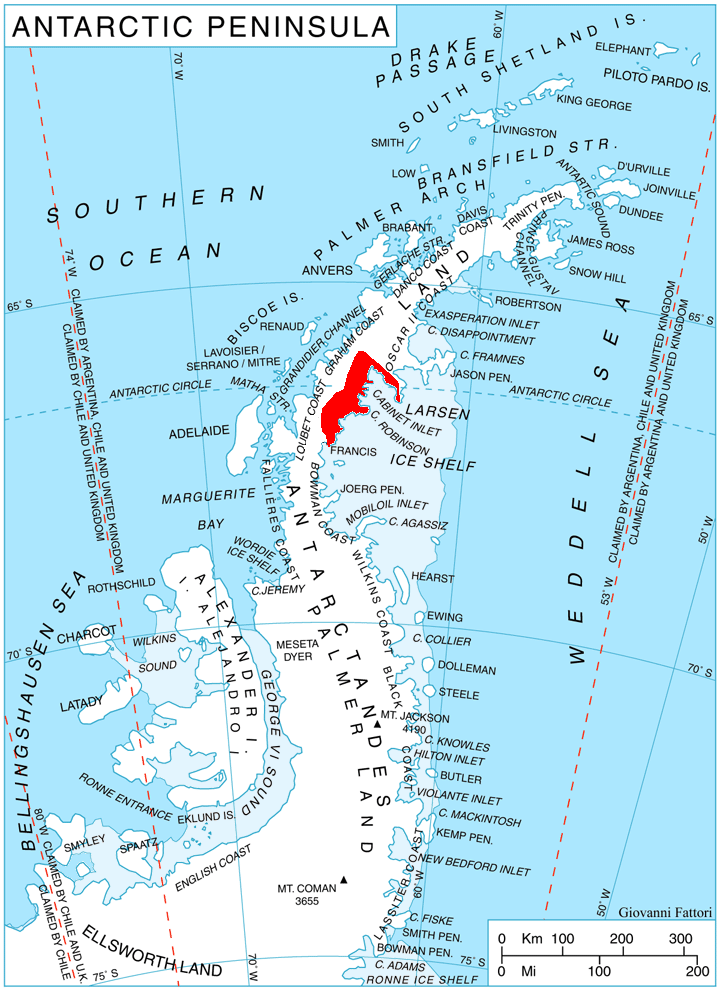
Location of Foyn Coast on Antarctic Peninsula.

Varad Point (Bulgarian: нос Варад, ‘Nos Varad’ \'nos va-'rad\) is the rocky point on Foyn Coast, Antarctic Peninsula situated 12.8 km west-southwest of Spur Point and 33.6 km north-northwest of Cape Robinson.

The feature is named after the settlement of Varad in Southern Bulgaria.

== Location ==
Varad Point is located at 66°37′51″S 64°04′24″W. British mapping in 1976.

== Maps ==
- British Antarctic Territory. Scale 1:200000 topographic map. DOS 610 Series, Sheet W 66 64. Directorate of Overseas Surveys, Tolworth, UK, 1976.
- Antarctic Digital Database (ADD). Scale 1:250000 topographic map of Antarctica. Scientific Committee on Antarctic Research (SCAR). Since 1993, regularly upgraded and updated.
