= Boeritsa Point =

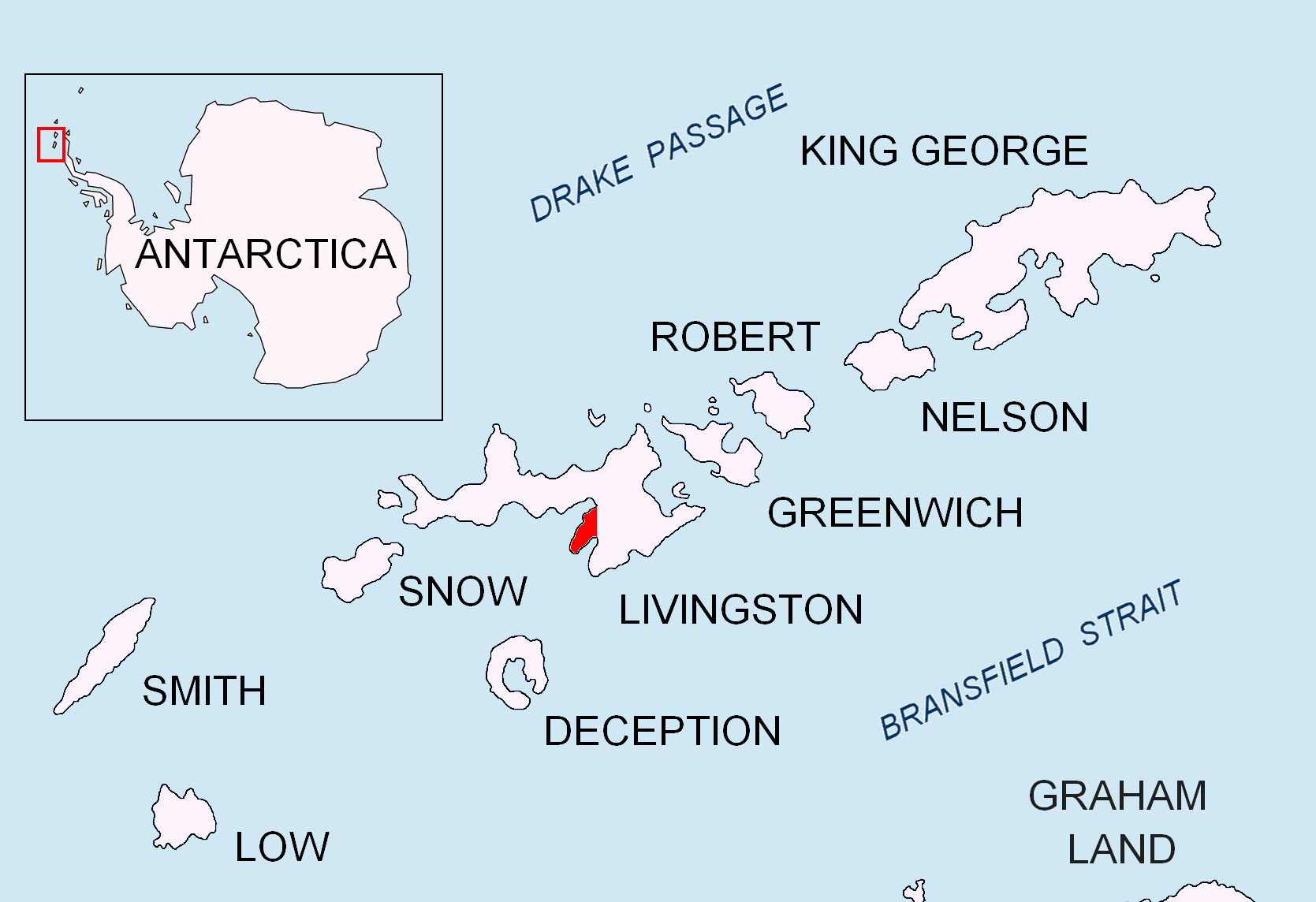
Location of Hurd Peninsula on Livingston Island in the South Shetland Islands

Topographic map of Livingston Island and Smith Island

Boeritsa Point (Bulgarian: нос Боерица, ‘Nos Boeritsa’ \'nos 'bo-e-ri-tsa\) is the rocky point on the southeast coast of South Bay, Hurd Peninsula on Livingston Island in the South Shetland Islands, Antarctica formed by an offshoot of Atlantic Club Ridge. Its shape is enhanced by the retreat of adjacent Contell Glacier in the late 20th and early 21st century.

The feature is named after the settlement of Boeritsa in western Bulgaria.

== Location ==
Boeritsa Point is located at 62°39′00″S 60°22′22″W, which is 730 m south of Hespérides Point and 880 m north-northeast of Ballester Point. Bulgarian mapping in 1996 and 2009.

== Maps ==
- L.L. Ivanov. Livingston Island: Central-Eastern Region. Scale 1:25000 topographic map. Sofia: Antarctic Place-names Commission of Bulgaria, 1996.
- L.L. Ivanov. Antarctica: Livingston Island and Greenwich, Robert, Snow and Smith Islands. Scale 1:120000 topographic map. Troyan: Manfred Wörner Foundation, 2009. ISBN 978-954-92032-6-4
