= Attlee Glacier =

Glacier in Antarctica

- Location within Antarctica
- Location: Graham Land
- Coordinates: 66°13′S 63°46′W
- Length: 13 km (8.1 mi)
- Thickness: unknown
- Highest elevation: 255 m (837 ft)
- Terminus: Cabinet Inlet
- Status: unknown

Attlee Glacier (66°13′S 63°46′W) is a glacier 8 miles (13 km) long, which flows east-southeast from the plateau escarpment on the east side of Graham Land to the head of Cabinet Inlet to the north of Bevin Glacier.

== History ==
Attlee Glacier was charted, in December 1947, from the ground by the Falkland Islands Dependencies Survey (FIDS) and photographed from the air by the Ronne Antarctic Research Expedition. It was named by the FIDS for Rt. Hon. Clement Attlee, M.P., British Secretary of State for Dominion Affairs, member of the War Cabinet, and later Prime Minister of the United Kingdom.

== See also ==
- List of glaciers in the Antarctic
- Glaciology
