= Mill Inlet =

Body of water in Graham Land, Antarctica

Mill Inlet (67°0′S 64°20′W) is an ice-filled inlet which recedes 8 nautical miles (15 km) in a northwesterly direction and is some 20 nautical miles (37 km) wide at its entrance between Cape Robinson and Monnier Point, along the east coast of Graham Land, Antarctica. It was charted by the Falkland Islands Dependencies Survey in 1947 and named for Hugh Robert Mill. It was photographed from the air during 1947 by the Ronne Antarctic Research Expedition under Finn Ronne.

== See also ==
- Aagaard Glacier, flows in a southerly direction into Mill Inlet
