= Bigla Ridge =

Ridge on the Foyn Coast, Antarctic Peninsula

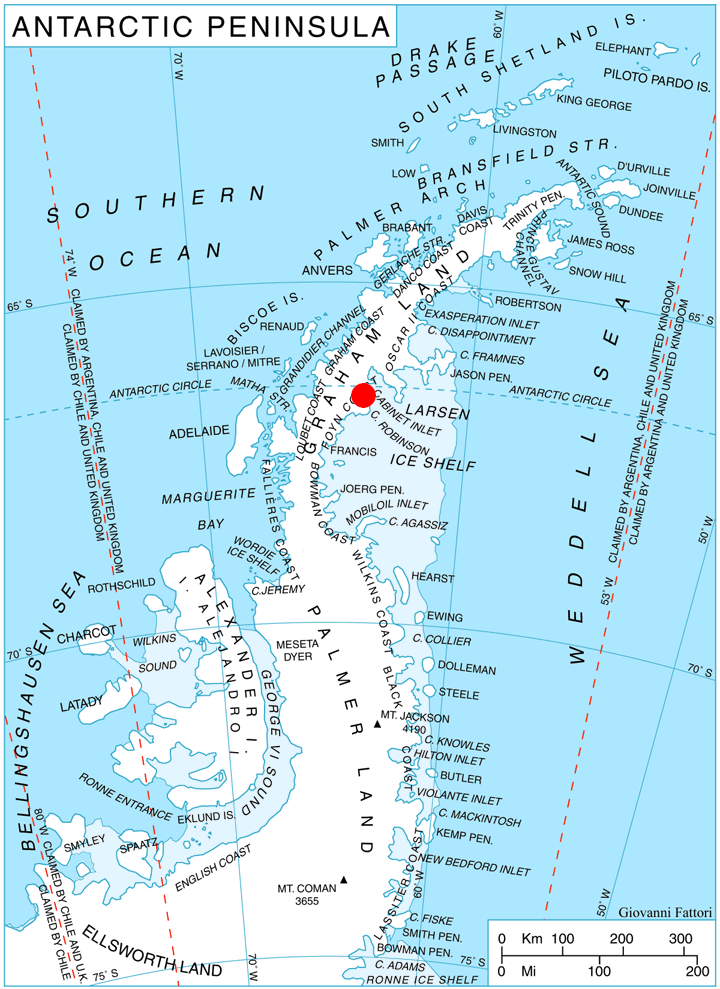
Location of Heros Peninsula in Graham Land, Antarctic Peninsula.

Bigla Ridge (Bulgarian: хребет Бигла, ‘Hrebet Bigla’ \'hre-bet 'bi-gla\) is the rocky, partly ice-free ridge extending 19 km in northwest-southeast direction, 8.8 km wide and rising to 1644 m (Stancheva Peak) on Foyn Coast, Antarctic Peninsula. The ridge is crescent-shaped facing southwest and surmounting Sleipnir Glacier to the northwest and Beaglehole Glacier to the southwest, with its southeast half forming Heros Peninsula.

The feature is named after Bigla Peak in the Balkan Mountains, Bulgaria.

== Location ==
Bigla Ridge is centred at 66°32′00″S 63°57′00″W. British mapping in 1974 and 1976.

== Maps ==
- British Antarctic Territory: Graham Land. Scale 1:250000 topographic map. BAS 250 Series, Sheet SQ 19-20. London, 1974.
- British Antarctic Territory. Scale 1:200000 topographic map. DOS 610 Series, Sheet W 66 64. Directorate of Overseas Surveys, Tolworth, UK, 1976.
- Antarctic Digital Database (ADD). Scale 1:250000 topographic map of Antarctica. Scientific Committee on Antarctic Research (SCAR), 1993–2016.
