= Balder Point =

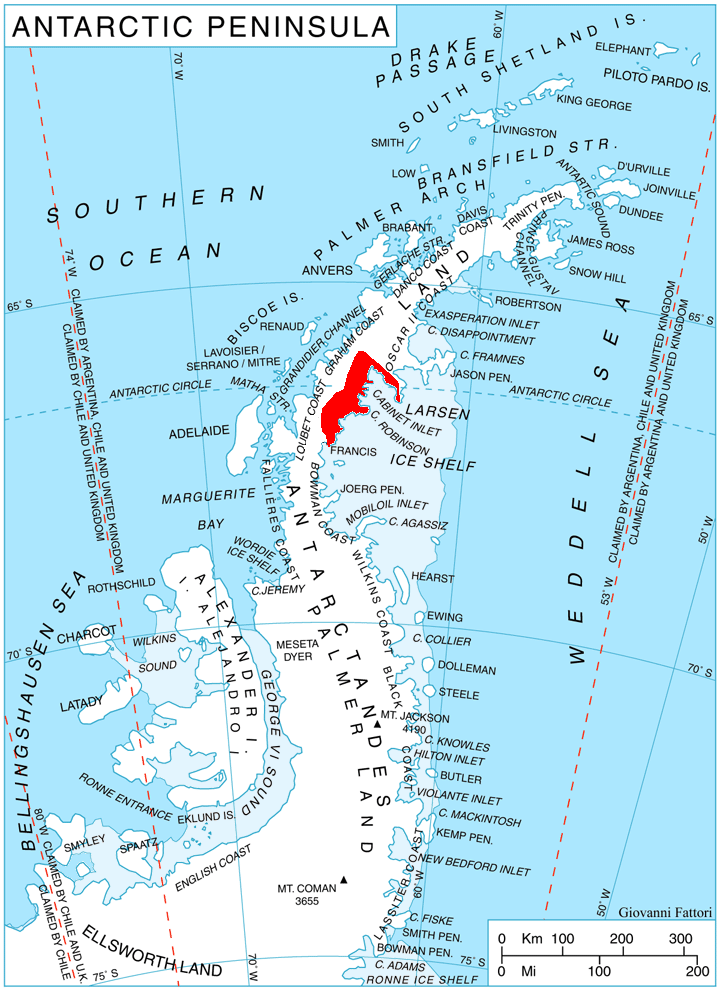
Location of Foyn Coast on Antarctic Peninsula

Balder Point (66°27′S 63°45′W) is a headland in Antarctica marking the eastern tip of a narrow, rocky "cockscomb" ridge, which extends from Frigga Peak for 6 nautical miles (11 km) in an east-southeast direction to the west side of Cabinet Inlet, on the east coast of Graham Land. It was charted in 1947 by the Falkland Islands Dependencies Survey, who named it after the Norse god Balder, the mythological son of Frigga and Odin.
