= Heros Peninsula =

Peninsula in Antarctica

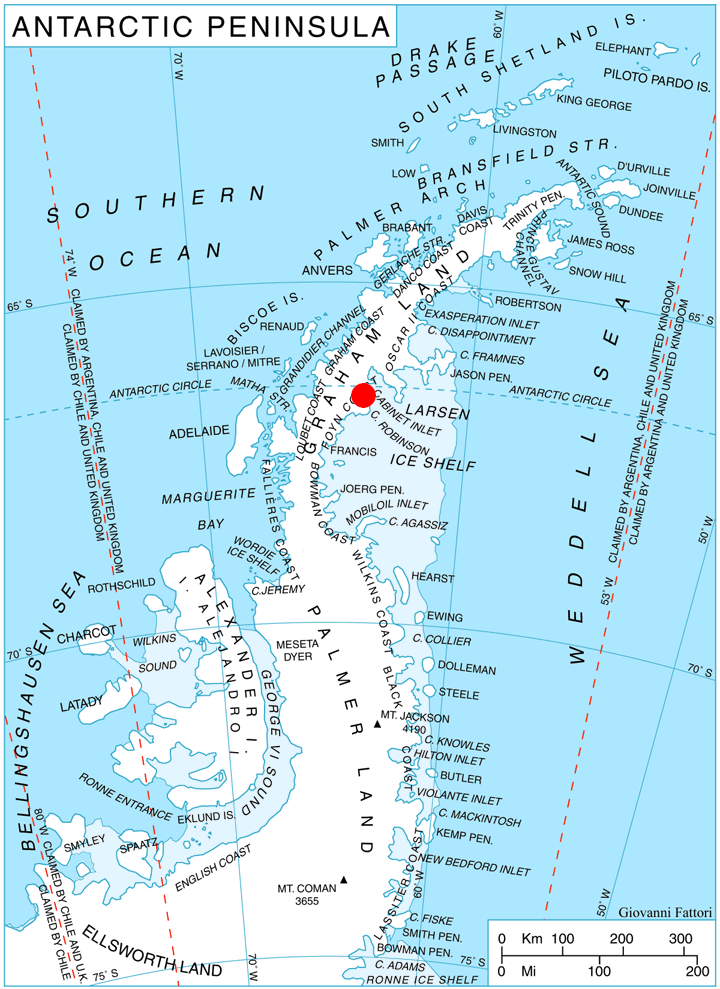
Location of Heros Peninsula in Graham Land, Antarctic Peninsula.

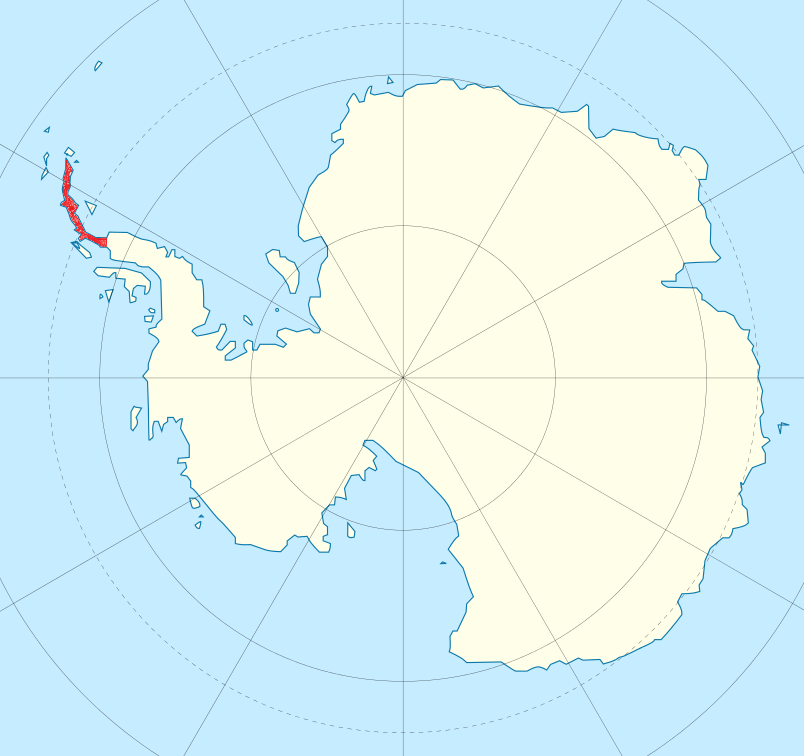
Location of Heros Peninsula (highlited red) on a map of Antarctica.

Heros Peninsula (Bulgarian: полуостров Херос, romanized: poluostrov Heros, IPA: [poɫuˈɔstrof ˈxɛros]) is the partly ice-free 8.9 km wide peninsula projecting from Foyn Coast, Antarctic Peninsula 13 km southeastwards into Cabinet Inlet. It ends in Spur Point to the southeast.

The feature is named after the Thracian god Heros (the Thracian Rider).

== Location ==
Heros Peninsula is centred at 66°33′00″S 63°54′00″W. British mapping in 1974.

== Maps ==
- British Antarctic Territory: Graham Land. Scale 1:250000 topographic map. BAS 250 Series, Sheet SQ 19–20. London, 1974.
- Antarctic Digital Database (ADD). Scale 1:250000 topographic map of Antarctica. Scientific Committee on Antarctic Research (SCAR). Since 1993, regularly upgraded and updated.
