= Spur Point =

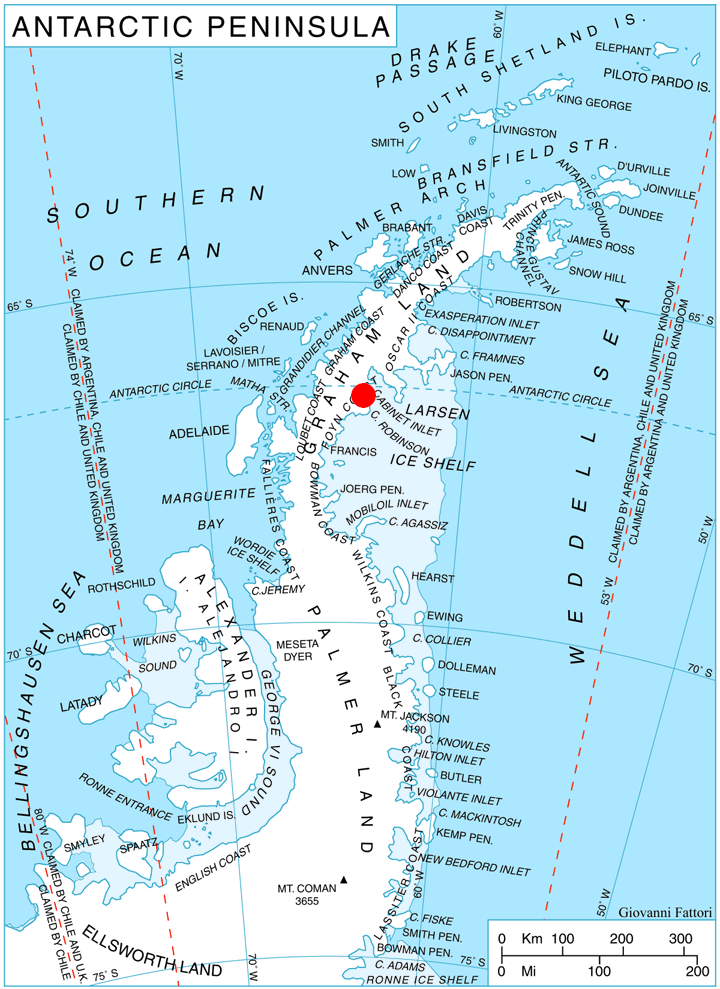
Location of Heros Peninsula in Graham Land, Antarctic Peninsula.

Spur Point (66°36′S 63°48′W) is a point at the east end of Bigla Ridge, a black, rocky spur that extends southeast between Sleipnir Glacier and Beaglehole Glacier to the west side of Cabinet Inlet, forming the southeast extremity of Heros Peninsula on the east coast of Graham Land. This descriptive name was given by the Falkland Islands Dependencies Survey (FIDS) following their survey in 1947. The feature was photographed from the air during 1947 by the Ronne Antarctic Research Expedition (RARE) under Ronne.
