= Beaglehole Glacier =

Glacier in Antarctica

- Location within Antarctica
- Location: Graham Land
- Coordinates: 66°33′S 64°7′W
- Thickness: unknown
- Highest elevation: 58 m (190 ft)
- Status: unknown

Beaglehole Glacier (66°33′S 64°7′W) is a glacier between Spur Point and Friederichsen Glacier on the east coast of Graham Land. It was named by the UK Antarctic Place-Names Committee after John Cawte Beaglehole, New Zealand historian of the Antarctic and biographer of Captain James Cook.

== See also ==
- List of glaciers in the Antarctic
- Glaciology
