= Cabinet Inlet =

Body of water in Graham Land, Antarctica

Cabinet Inlet (66°35′S 63°10′W) is an icy inlet, 36 miles (58 km) long in a northwest–southeast direction, and some 27 miles (43 km) wide at its entrance between Cape Alexander and Cape Robinson, along the east coast of Graham Land, Antarctica. It was named and charted by the Falkland Islands Dependencies Survey (FIDS) and aerially photographed by the Ronne Antarctic Research Expedition in December 1947. It is named for the British War Cabinet which authorized the FIDS in 1943.
