= Foyn Coast =

Antarctic Peninsula coast

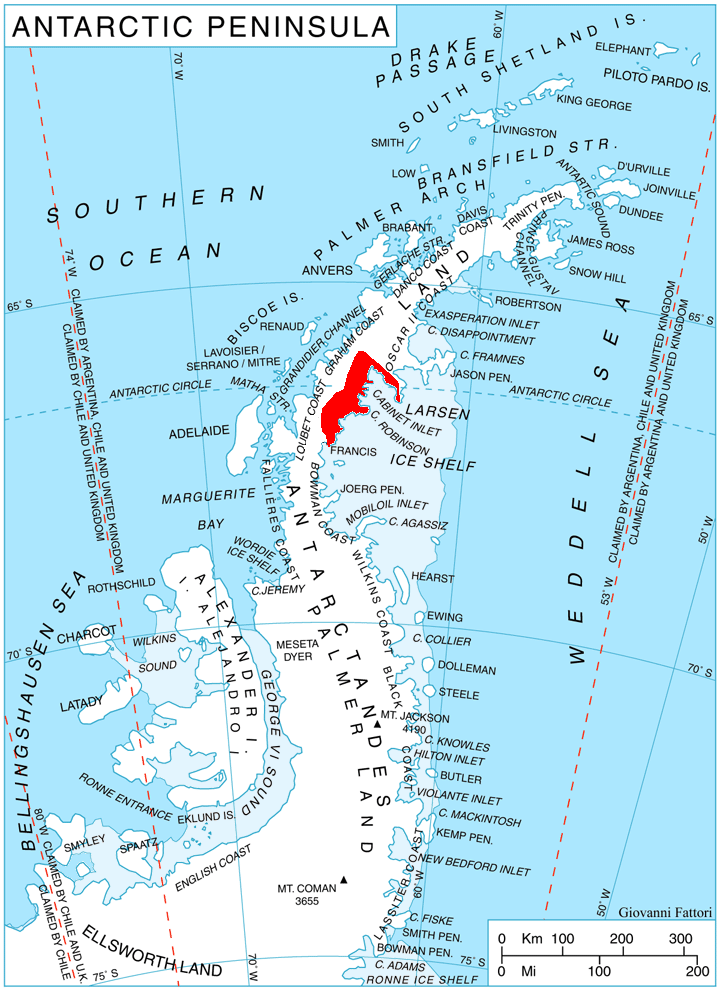
Location of Foyn Coast on Antarctic Peninsula.

The Foyn Coast (66°40′S 64°20′W) is that portion of the east coast of the Antarctic Peninsula between Cape Alexander and Cape Northrop. It was discovered in 1893 by a Norwegian expedition under Captain Carl Anton Larsen, who named it for Svend Foyn, a Norwegian whaler of Tønsberg whose invention of the grenade harpoon greatly facilitated modern whaling.
