= Kaska Lake =

Antarctic lake

- езеро Каската (Bulgarian)
- Location of Nelson Island in the South Shetland Islands

- Location within South Shetland Islands Location within Antarctic Peninsula Location within Antarctica
- Interactive map of Kaska Lake
- Location: Triangulation Beach, Nelson Island, South Shetland Islands
- Coordinates: 62°21′07″S 59°02′28″W
- Type: Lake
- Basin countries: Antarctica
- Max. length: 220 m (720 ft)
- Max. width: 115 m (377 ft)
- Surface area: 1.85 ha (4.6 acres)

Kaska Lake (Bulgarian: езеро Каската, romanized: ezero Kaskata, IPA: ['ɛzɛro 'kaskɐtɐ]) is the 220 m (720 ft) long in west–east direction and 115 m (377 ft) wide lake on Triangulation Beach, Nelson Island in the South Shetland Islands, Antarctica. It has a surface area of 1.85 ha (4.6 acres) and is separated from the waters of Bransfield Strait by a 12 to 38 m (39 to 125 ft) wide strip of land. The area was visited by early 19th century sealers.

The feature is so named because of its shape supposedly resembling a combat helmet ('kaska' in Bulgarian).

== Location ==
Kaska Lake is centred 460 m (1,510 ft) northeast of Vidaurre Point, the south extremity of the island, and 3.24 km (2.01 mi) west-southwest of Ivan Alexander Point. British mapping of the area in 1968.

== Maps ==
- Livingston Island to King George Island. Scale 1:200000. Admiralty Nautical Chart 1776. Taunton: UK Hydrographic Office, 1968
- South Shetland Islands. Scale 1:200000 topographic map No. 3373. DOS 610 - W 62 58. Tolworth, UK, 1968
- Antarctic Digital Database (ADD). Scale 1:250000 topographic map of Antarctica. Scientific Committee on Antarctic Research (SCAR). Since 1993, regularly upgraded and updated
