= Ginkgo Tarn =

Antarctic lake

- езеро Гинкго (Bulgarian)
- Location of Nelson Island in the South Shetland Islands

- Location within South Shetland Islands Location within Antarctic Peninsula Location within Antarctica
- Interactive map of Ginkgo Tarn
- Location: Long Beach, Nelson Island, South Shetland Islands
- Coordinates: 62°20′47″S 59°06′26″W
- Type: Lake
- Basin countries: Antarctica
- Max. length: 100 m (330 ft)
- Max. width: 140 m (460 ft)
- Surface area: 1.5 ha (3.7 acres)

Ginkgo Tarn (Bulgarian: езеро Гинкго, romanized: ezero Ginkgo, IPA: ['ɛzɛro 'ginko]) is the lake extending 140 m (460 ft) in southeast–northwest direction and 100 m (330 ft) in southwest–northeast direction on Long Beach, Nelson Island in the South Shetland Islands, Antarctica. It has a surface area of 1.5 ha (3.7 acres) and drains westwards into Platno Lake by way of a 250 m (820 ft) long stream. The area was visited by early 19th century sealers.

The feature is so named because of its shape supposedly resembling a ginkgo tree leaf.

== Location ==
Ginkgo Tarn is centred 820 m (0.5 mi) east-northeast of Ross Point, 6.55 km (4.07 mi) west of Ivan Alexander Point and 3.4 km (2.1 mi) west-northwest of Vidaurre Point, the south extremity of the island. British mapping of the area in 1968.

== Maps ==
- Livingston Island to King George Island. Scale 1:200000. Admiralty Nautical Chart 1776. Taunton: UK Hydrographic Office, 1968
- South Shetland Islands. Scale 1:200000 topographic map No. 3373. DOS 610 - W 62 58. Tolworth, UK, 1968
- Antarctic Digital Database (ADD). Scale 1:250000 topographic map of Antarctica. Scientific Committee on Antarctic Research (SCAR). Since 1993, regularly upgraded and updated
