= Triangulation (disambiguation) =

Triangulation is the process of determining the location of a point by forming triangles to it from known points.

Triangulation may also refer to:

== Arts, entertainment, and media ==
- Triangulation (chess), a maneuver in which one player moves a piece (often a king) in a triangular pattern in order to force the opponent to make a weakening move
- Triangulation (TWiT.tv), an interview podcast
- Triangulation (novel), a 1999 novel by Phil Whitaker

== Mathematics and technology ==
=== Graph theory ===
- Plane triangulation, and a maximal planar supergraph of a graph G may be called a triangulation of G
- Triangulated graph, and a chordal completion of a graph G may be called a triangulation of G

=== Spatial subdivisions ===
- Triangulation (geometry), division of the Euclidean plane into triangles and of Euclidean spaces into simplices
- Triangulation (topology), generalizations to topological spaces other than R^{d}
- Point-set triangulation, division of the convex hull of a point set into triangles using only that set as triangle vertices
- Polygon triangulation, division of a polygon into triangles
- Surface triangulation, division of a surface into triangles

=== Other uses in mathematics and technology ===
- Triangulation (computer vision), the computation of a 3D point given its projection onto two, or more, images
- Triangulation (surveying), a process used in surveying to determine unknown distances, angles and positions from those that are known
- Mobile phone tracking, a process which uses triangulation (actually, trilateration) to calculate the location of the handset
- Operation Triangulation, a targeted cyberattack on iOS devices disclosed in 2023
- Schur triangulation, a process of finding an upper triangular matrix similar to a given matrix
- Stellar triangulation, a method of geodesy which uses cosmic instead of terrestrial targets
- Triangulated category, a category defined by a set of axioms involving triangles of arrows
- Triangulation station, a fixed surveying station

== Psychology and social sciences ==
- Triangulation (psychology), situation in which one person interacts with another person via an intermediary third person
- Triangulation (social science), the use of multiple cross-checked sources and methodology
- Karpman drama triangle, resulting from "triangulation", a psychological and social model of human interaction – typically among the roles of persecutor, victim, and rescuer

== Other uses ==
- Triangulation (finance), a financial strategy whereby the relationship between three currencies is exploited
- Triangulation (politics), the act of a candidate presenting his or her ideology as "above and between" the left and right side of the political spectrum
- Triangulation Beach, in Antarctica
