= Ginkgo (disambiguation) =

Ginkgo is a genus of plants.

Ginkgo may also refer to:

- Ginkgo (album), an album by the rock band Panchiko
- Ginkgo Bioworks, a U.S. biotech company
- Ginkgo CADx, open-source image-processing software
- Ginkgo Creek, a stream in the U.S. state of Oregon
- Ginkgo Prize, a poetry prize awarded by Poetry School
- Ginkgo Tarn, a lake on Nelson Island, Antarctica
- 85197 Ginkgo, a minor planet
- USS Ginkgo, a U.S. Navy ship now known as USS Mastic
- Gingko (organisation), stylized "GINGKO", a British academic book publisher, conference organiser, and grant administrator
