= Solar eclipse of October 24, 1995 =

Total eclipse

- Total eclipse
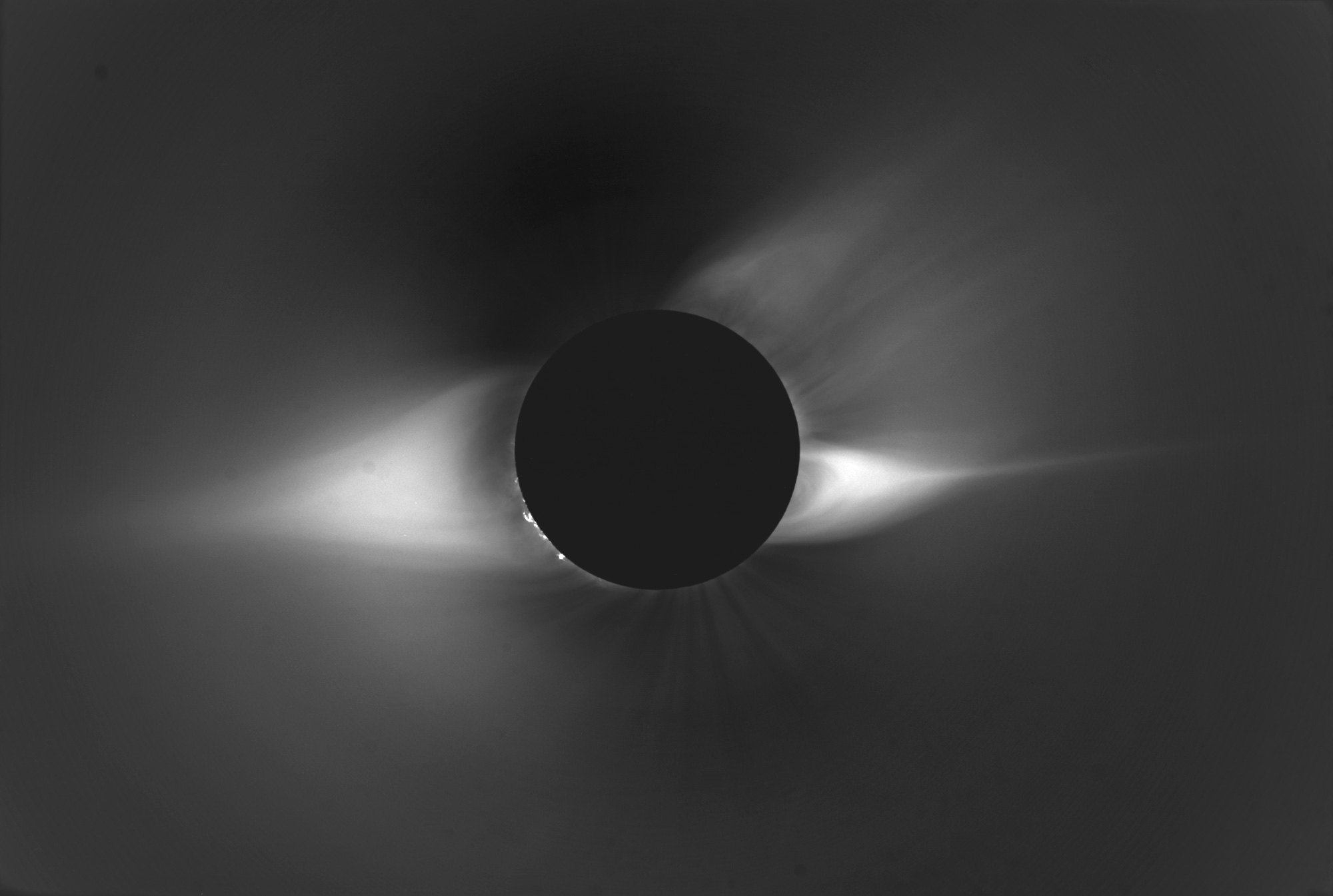
- Corona during total solar eclipse by Fred Espenak from Dundlod, India

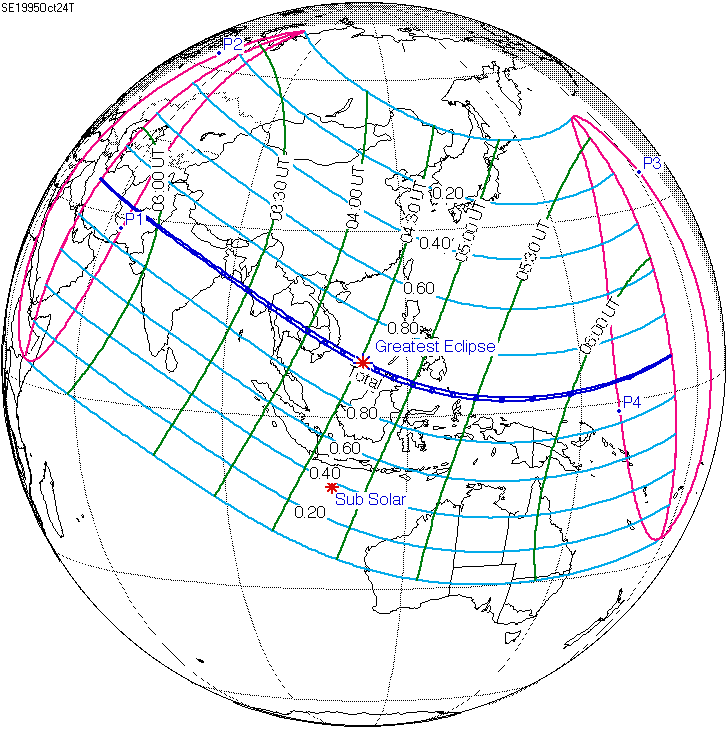
- Map
- Gamma: 0.3518
- Magnitude: 1.0213

Maximum eclipse
- Duration: 130 s (2 min 10 s)
- Coordinates: 8.4°N 113.2°E
- Max. width of band: 78 km (48 mi)

Times (UTC)
- Greatest eclipse: 4:33:30

References
- Saros: 143 (22 of 72)
- Catalog # (SE5000): 9498

A total solar eclipse occurred at the Moon's ascending node of orbit on Tuesday, October 24, 1995, with a magnitude of 1.0213. A solar eclipse occurs when the Moon passes between Earth and the Sun, thereby totally or partly obscuring the image of the Sun for a viewer on Earth. A total solar eclipse occurs when the Moon's apparent diameter is larger than the Sun's, blocking all direct sunlight, turning day into darkness. Totality occurs in a narrow path across Earth's surface, with the partial solar eclipse visible over a surrounding region thousands of kilometres wide. Occurring about 2.7 days before perigee (on October 26, 1995, at 21:00 UTC), the Moon's apparent diameter was larger.

The path of totality went through Iran, Afghanistan, Pakistan, India, southwestern tip of Bangladesh, Burma, Thailand, Cambodia, Vietnam, Spratly Islands, northeastern tip of Sabah of Malaysia, Philippines and Indonesia. A partial eclipse was visible for parts of Northeast Africa, Asia, Australia, and northern Oceania.

== Observation ==
Animated path

=== India ===
An aerial observation of this eclipse was done over India, when a MiG-25 reconnaissance aircraft of the Indian Air Force was used to take images of this eclipse at an altitude of 25 km.

The Indian Institute of Astrophysics established camps along the path of totality in Rajasthan, Uttar Pradesh, Iradatganj and Diamond Harbour near Kolkata. Astronomers from other institutions and abroad from the Slovakia, Brazil, Russia, Japan and Germany joined IIA at its camps. An IIA team also photographed the eclipse by chasing the Moon’s shadow in an Indian Air Force plane AN-32 from the crew escape hatch on the roof of the cockpit at an altitude of 10,000 feet (3,000 m) above the sea level, which was the first time efforts made by the institute. Doordarshan and All India Radio made live coverages of the eclipse. The eclipse happened to occur on the day of the Diwali.

=== China ===
Within the Spratly Islands claimed by China, only Cuarteron Reef was controlled by China and lay in the path of totality. Instead of going to the faraway island, The Popular Science Committee of the Chinese Astronomical Society, Beijing Astronomical Society, Beijing Planetarium and Beijing Astronomical Observatory (now incorporated into the National Astronomical Observatories of China) jointly organized observations abroad for the first time. A team of 4 was sent to Sikhio district, Nakhon Ratchasima, Thailand by the Beijing Planetarium, and successfully photographed the whole process of the eclipse, the corona at the greatest eclipse, and the Baily's beads at the 2nd and 3rd contact.

In addition, the Chinese Academy of Sciences, Ministry of Electronics Industry, China Earthquake Administration, State Education Commission (now Ministry of Education) and departments in charge of water conservancy and meteorology conducted joint observations on changes of solar radiation, ionosphere, geomagnetic field, radio and acoustic heavy waves, mainly in the Paracel Islands, Sanya, Haikou and Zhengzhou. From all these places, only a partial solar eclipse was visible instead of a total solar eclipse.

== Eclipse timing ==
=== Places experiencing total eclipse ===
Solar Eclipse of October 24, 1995 (Local Times)
Country or territory	City or place	Start of partial eclipse	Start of total eclipse	Maximum eclipse	End of total eclipse	End of partial eclipse	Duration of totality (min:s)	Duration of eclipse (hr:min)	Maximum magnitude
Iran	Birjand	05:43:41 (sunrise)	06:23:23	06:23:27	06:23:32	07:30:24	0:09	1:47	1.0006
Afghanistan	Lashkargah	06:22:36	07:24:53	07:25:09	07:25:24	08:35:00	0:31	2:13	1.0033
Pakistan	Bahawalpur	06:53:06	07:59:11	07:59:16	07:59:20	09:13:50	0:09	2:21	1.0005
India	Sikar	07:23:54	08:31:40	08:32:04	08:32:29	09:49:14	0:49	2:25	1.0055
India	Alwar	07:24:26	08:33:11	08:33:28	08:33:45	09:51:42	0:34	2:27	1.0018
India	Mathura	07:24:45	08:34:05	08:34:16	08:34:28	09:53:08	0:23	2:28	1.001
India	Bharatpur	07:24:47	08:34:03	08:34:22	08:34:40	09:53:18	0:37	2:29	1.002
India	Dholpur	07:24:54	08:34:38	08:34:47	08:34:58	09:54:09	0:20	2:29	1.0008
India	Auraiya	07:25:42	08:36:28	08:36:34	08:36:40	09:57:06	0:12	2:31	1.0005
India	Manjhanpur	07:26:42	08:38:23	08:38:52	08:39:22	10:01:01	0:59	2:34	1.0049
India	Prayagraj	07:26:59	08:39:07	08:39:27	08:39:48	10:01:58	0:41	2:35	1.002
India	Mirzapur	07:27:27	08:40:10	08:40:27	08:40:43	10:03:33	0:33	2:36	1.0013
India	Robertsganj	07:27:47	08:40:39	08:41:11	08:41:44	10:04:49	1:05	2:37	1.0068
India	Medininagar	07:28:31	08:42:24	08:42:41	08:42:58	10:07:16	0:34	2:39	1.0013
India	Purulia	07:30:23	08:45:50	08:46:18	08:46:45	10:12:49	0:55	2:42	1.003
India	Panskura	07:31:38	08:48:06	08:48:40	08:49:15	10:16:29	1:09	2:45	1.0047
India	Tamluk	07:31:50	08:48:28	08:49:03	08:49:37	10:17:03	1:09	2:45	1.0046
India	Batanagar	07:32:04	08:49:05	08:49:25	08:49:46	10:17:33	0:41	2:45	1.0015
Thailand	Nakhon Sawan	09:19:28	10:47:04	10:47:58	10:48:52	12:26:03	1:48	3:07	1.0083
Thailand	Nakhon Ratchasima	09:23:12	10:53:13	10:53:30	10:53:47	12:32:35	0:34	3:09	1.0007
Cambodia	Siem Reap	09:27:34	10:58:59	10:59:47	11:00:36	12:39:50	1:37	3:12	1.0047
Cambodia	Kratié	09:32:25	11:05:37	11:06:33	11:07:29	12:47:10	1:52	3:15	1.0066
Vietnam	Phan Thiết	09:38:11	11:13:24	11:14:17	11:15:11	12:55:13	1:47	3:17	1.0053

=== Places experiencing partial eclipse ===
Solar Eclipse of October 24, 1995 (Local Times)
Country or territory	City or place	Start of partial eclipse	Maximum eclipse	End of partial eclipse	Duration of eclipse (hr:min)	Maximum coverage
United Arab Emirates	Dubai	06:21:29 (sunrise)	06:50:17	07:53:27	1:32	67.51%
Iran	Tehran	06:18:10 (sunrise)	06:23:05	07:26:09	1:08	97.01%
Turkmenistan	Ashgabat	07:23:03 (sunrise)	07:55:44	09:01:08	1:38	82.90%
Kuwait	Kuwait City	05:54:55 (sunrise)	05:57:27	06:50:51	0:56	72.37%
Afghanistan	Kabul	06:24:53	07:28:57	08:40:20	2:15	84.50%
Pakistan	Islamabad	06:55:33	08:01:24	09:15:01	2:19	82.86%
Pakistan	Lahore	06:54:48	08:01:50	09:17:09	2:22	89.02%
Uzbekistan	Tashkent	07:01:31	08:02:37	09:09:36	2:08	60.87%
Azerbaijan	Baku	07:00:29 (sunrise)	07:03:24	07:57:19	0:57	75.08%
India	New Delhi	07:24:56	08:34:06	09:52:22	2:27	95.91%
Nepal	Kathmandu	07:44:53	08:58:42	10:22:12	2:37	87.08%
Bhutan	Thimphu	08:03:52	09:20:03	10:45:54	2:42	80.95%
Bangladesh	Dhaka	08:04:05	09:22:31	10:51:25	2:47	92.62%
Myanmar	Yangon	08:43:03	10:07:59	11:43:35	3:01	97.42%
Thailand	Bangkok	09:21:36	10:50:56	12:29:41	3:08	95.58%
Laos	Vientiane	09:22:21	10:51:37	12:29:24	3:07	89.55%
Vietnam	Hanoi	09:27:52	10:56:40	12:32:13	3:04	73.36%
Cambodia	Phnom Penh	09:31:14	11:04:47	12:45:22	3:14	97.14%
Vietnam	Ho Chi Minh City	09:35:30	11:10:37	12:51:31	3:16	97.94%
Singapore	Singapore	10:46:00	12:16:07	13:51:32	3:06	59.64%
Brunei	Bandar Seri Begawan	11:01:46	12:42:29	14:20:56	3:19	92.65%
Malaysia	Kota Kinabalu	11:03:05	12:44:18	14:22:30	3:19	98.21%
Philippines	Manila	11:09:21	12:47:07	14:19:52	3:11	69.29%
Philippines	General Santos	11:29:12	13:10:23	14:41:24	3:12	93.45%
Palau	Ngerulmud	12:57:43	14:32:30	15:53:59	2:56	81.79%
Indonesia	Manokwari	13:04:49	14:39:03	15:59:56	2:55	90.03%
Federated States of Micronesia	Palikir	15:53:10	17:06:24	18:09:20 (sunset)	2:16	86.85%
Marshall Islands	Majuro	17:07:20	18:11:34	18:16:20 (sunset)	1:09	94.80%
Kiribati	Tarawa	17:12:00	18:12:19	18:14:31 (sunset)	1:03	82.75%
Nauru	Yaren	17:08:33	18:14:03	18:40:26 (sunset)	1:32	80.43%

== In popular culture ==
Phil Whitaker's prize-winning debut novel Eclipse of the Sun published in 1997 and set in India has at its centre a dramatic attempt to organize a public viewing of the eclipse.

Meet Me at the Eclipse (Vietnamese: Hẹn em ngày nhật thực) is a 2026 high-grossing Vietnamese film unfolding around the eclipse.

== Eclipse details ==
Shown below are two tables displaying details about this particular solar eclipse. The first table outlines times at which the Moon's penumbra or umbra attains the specific parameter, and the second table describes various other parameters pertaining to this eclipse.

October 24, 1995 Solar Eclipse Times
Event	Time (UTC)
First Penumbral External Contact	1995 October 24 at 01:52:54.3 UTC
First Umbral External Contact	1995 October 24 at 02:53:31.6 UTC
First Central Line	1995 October 24 at 02:53:39.8 UTC
First Umbral Internal Contact	1995 October 24 at 02:53:47.9 UTC
First Penumbral Internal Contact	1995 October 24 at 04:03:07.3 UTC
Equatorial Conjunction	1995 October 24 at 04:23:32.2 UTC
Greatest Eclipse	1995 October 24 at 04:33:30.5 UTC
Ecliptic Conjunction	1995 October 24 at 04:37:13.7 UTC
Greatest Duration	1995 October 24 at 04:37:39.5 UTC
Last Penumbral Internal Contact	1995 October 24 at 05:04:10.7 UTC
Last Umbral Internal Contact	1995 October 24 at 06:13:17.4 UTC
Last Central Line	1995 October 24 at 06:13:27.9 UTC
Last Umbral External Contact	1995 October 24 at 06:13:38.5 UTC
Last Penumbral External Contact	1995 October 24 at 07:14:06.3 UTC

October 24, 1995 Solar Eclipse Parameters
Parameter	Value
Eclipse Magnitude	1.02135
Eclipse Obscuration	1.04315
Gamma	0.35176
Sun Right Ascension	13h52m45.4s
Sun Declination	-11°34'24.4"
Sun Semi-Diameter	16'04.7"
Sun Equatorial Horizontal Parallax	08.8"
Moon Right Ascension	13h53m07.2s
Moon Declination	-11°14'17.0"
Moon Semi-Diameter	16'10.1"
Moon Equatorial Horizontal Parallax	0°59'20.4"
ΔT	61.4 s

== Eclipse season ==
This eclipse is part of an eclipse season, a period, roughly every six months, when eclipses occur. Only two (or occasionally three) eclipse seasons occur each year, and each season lasts about 35 days and repeats just short of six months (173 days) later; thus two full eclipse seasons always occur each year. Either two or three eclipses happen each eclipse season. In the sequence below, each eclipse is separated by a fortnight.

Eclipse season of October 1995
October 8 Descending node (full moon)	October 24 Ascending node (new moon)
Penumbral lunar eclipse Lunar Saros 117	Total solar eclipse Solar Saros 143

== Related eclipses ==
=== Eclipses in 1995 ===
- A partial lunar eclipse on April 15.
- An annular solar eclipse on April 29.
- A penumbral lunar eclipse on October 8.
- A total solar eclipse on October 24.

=== Metonic ===
- Preceded by: Solar eclipse of January 4, 1992
- Followed by: Solar eclipse of August 11, 1999

=== Tzolkinex ===
- Preceded by: Solar eclipse of September 11, 1988
- Followed by: Solar eclipse of December 4, 2002

=== Half-Saros ===
- Preceded by: Lunar eclipse of October 17, 1986
- Followed by: Lunar eclipse of October 28, 2004

=== Tritos ===
- Preceded by: Solar eclipse of November 22, 1984
- Followed by: Solar eclipse of September 22, 2006

=== Solar Saros 143 ===
- Preceded by: Solar eclipse of October 12, 1977
- Followed by: Solar eclipse of November 3, 2013

=== Inex ===
- Preceded by: Solar eclipse of November 12, 1966
- Followed by: Solar eclipse of October 2, 2024

=== Triad ===
- Preceded by: Solar eclipse of December 23, 1908
- Followed by: Solar eclipse of August 24, 2082

=== Solar eclipses of 1993–1996 ===
This eclipse is a member of a semester series. An eclipse in a semester series of solar eclipses repeats approximately every 177 days and 4 hours (a semester) at alternating nodes of the Moon's orbit.

Solar eclipse series sets from 1993 to 1996
Descending node			Ascending node		
Saros	Map	Gamma	Saros	Map	Gamma
118	May 21, 1993 Partial	1.1372	123	November 13, 1993 Partial	−1.0411
128 Partial in Bismarck, ND, USA	May 10, 1994 Annular	0.4077	133 Totality in Bolivia	November 3, 1994 Total	−0.3522
138	April 29, 1995 Annular	−0.3382	143 Totality in Dundlod, India	October 24, 1995 Total	0.3518
148	April 17, 1996 Partial	−1.058	153	October 12, 1996 Partial	1.1227

=== Saros 143 ===
This eclipse is a part of Saros series 143, repeating every 18 years, 11 days, and containing 72 events. The series started with a partial solar eclipse on March 7, 1617. It contains total eclipses from June 24, 1797 through October 24, 1995; hybrid eclipses from November 3, 2013 through December 6, 2067; and annular eclipses from December 16, 2085 through September 16, 2536. The series ends at member 72 as a partial eclipse on April 23, 2897. Its eclipses are tabulated in three columns; every third eclipse in the same column is one exeligmos apart, so they all cast shadows over approximately the same parts of the Earth.

The longest duration of totality was produced by member 16 at 3 minutes, 50 seconds on August 19, 1887, and the longest duration of annularity will be produced by member 51 at 4 minutes, 54 seconds on September 6, 2518. All eclipses in this series occur at the Moon’s ascending node of orbit.

Series members 12–33 occur between 1801 and 2200:
12	13	14
July 6, 1815	July 17, 1833	July 28, 1851
15	16	17
August 7, 1869	August 19, 1887	August 30, 1905
18	19	20
September 10, 1923	September 21, 1941	October 2, 1959
21	22	23
October 12, 1977	October 24, 1995	November 3, 2013
24	25	26
November 14, 2031	November 25, 2049	December 6, 2067
27	28	29
December 16, 2085	December 29, 2103	January 8, 2122
30	31	32
January 20, 2140	January 30, 2158	February 10, 2176
33
February 21, 2194

=== Metonic series ===
The metonic series repeats eclipses every 19 years (6939.69 days), lasting about 5 cycles. Eclipses occur in nearly the same calendar date. In addition, the octon subseries repeats 1/5 of that or every 3.8 years (1387.94 days). All eclipses in this table occur at the Moon's ascending node.

22 eclipse events between January 5, 1935 and August 11, 2018
January 4–5	October 23–24	August 10–12	May 30–31	March 18–19
111	113	115	117	119
January 5, 1935		August 12, 1942	May 30, 1946	March 18, 1950
121	123	125	127	129
January 5, 1954	October 23, 1957	August 11, 1961	May 30, 1965	March 18, 1969
131	133	135	137	139
January 4, 1973	October 23, 1976	August 10, 1980	May 30, 1984	March 18, 1988
141	143	145	147	149
January 4, 1992	October 24, 1995	August 11, 1999	May 31, 2003	March 19, 2007
151	153	155		
January 4, 2011	October 23, 2014	August 11, 2018		

=== Tritos series ===
This eclipse is a part of a tritos cycle, repeating at alternating nodes every 135 synodic months (≈ 3986.63 days, or 11 years minus 1 month). Their appearance and longitude are irregular due to a lack of synchronization with the anomalistic month (period of perigee), but groupings of 3 tritos cycles (≈ 33 years minus 3 months) come close (≈ 434.044 anomalistic months), so eclipses are similar in these groupings.

Series members between 1801 and 2200
April 4, 1810 (Saros 126)	March 4, 1821 (Saros 127)	February 1, 1832 (Saros 128)	December 31, 1842 (Saros 129)	November 30, 1853 (Saros 130)
October 30, 1864 (Saros 131)	September 29, 1875 (Saros 132)	August 29, 1886 (Saros 133)	July 29, 1897 (Saros 134)	June 28, 1908 (Saros 135)
May 29, 1919 (Saros 136)	April 28, 1930 (Saros 137)	March 27, 1941 (Saros 138)	February 25, 1952 (Saros 139)	January 25, 1963 (Saros 140)
December 24, 1973 (Saros 141)	November 22, 1984 (Saros 142)	October 24, 1995 (Saros 143)	September 22, 2006 (Saros 144)	August 21, 2017 (Saros 145)
July 22, 2028 (Saros 146)	June 21, 2039 (Saros 147)	May 20, 2050 (Saros 148)	April 20, 2061 (Saros 149)	March 19, 2072 (Saros 150)
February 16, 2083 (Saros 151)	January 16, 2094 (Saros 152)	December 17, 2104 (Saros 153)	November 16, 2115 (Saros 154)	October 16, 2126 (Saros 155)
September 15, 2137 (Saros 156)	August 14, 2148 (Saros 157)	July 15, 2159 (Saros 158)	June 14, 2170 (Saros 159)	May 13, 2181 (Saros 160)
April 12, 2192 (Saros 161)

=== Inex series ===
This eclipse is a part of the long period inex cycle, repeating at alternating nodes, every 358 synodic months (≈ 10,571.95 days, or 29 years minus 20 days). Their appearance and longitude are irregular due to a lack of synchronization with the anomalistic month (period of perigee). However, groupings of 3 inex cycles (≈ 87 years minus 2 months) comes close (≈ 1,151.02 anomalistic months), so eclipses are similar in these groupings.

Series members between 1801 and 2200
February 21, 1822 (Saros 137)	February 1, 1851 (Saros 138)	January 11, 1880 (Saros 139)
December 23, 1908 (Saros 140)	December 2, 1937 (Saros 141)	November 12, 1966 (Saros 142)
October 24, 1995 (Saros 143)	October 2, 2024 (Saros 144)	September 12, 2053 (Saros 145)
August 24, 2082 (Saros 146)	August 4, 2111 (Saros 147)	July 14, 2140 (Saros 148)
June 25, 2169 (Saros 149)	June 4, 2198 (Saros 150)	
