= Platno Lake (South Shetland Islands) =

Lake on Nelson Island, Antarctica

- езеро Платното (Bulgarian)

- Location in Antarctica
- Location: Nelson Island, South Shetland Islands, Antarctica
- Type: Natural lake
- Basin countries: Antarctica
- Max. length: 410 m (1,350 ft)
- Max. width: 170 m (560 ft)
- Surface area: 4.2 ha (10 acres)

Platno Lake (Bulgarian: езеро Платното, romanized: ezero Platnoto, IPA: ['ɛzɛro plɐt'nɔto]) is the 410 m long in southwest–northeast direction and 170 m wide lake on Long Beach, Nelson Island in the South Shetland Islands, Antarctica. It has a surface area of 4.2 ha and is separated from the waters of Bransfield Strait by a 40 to 110 m wide strip of land. The area was visited by early 19th century sealers.

The feature is so named because of its shape supposedly resembling a sail ('platno' in Bulgarian).

== Location ==
Platno Lake is situated at the base of Ross Point and centred at 62°20′51″S 59°06′48″W, which is 3.56 km southeast of The Toe and 3.4 km west-northwest of Vidaurre Point, the south extremity of the island. British mapping of the area in 1968.

== Maps ==
- Livingston Island to King George Island. Scale 1:200000. Admiralty Nautical Chart 1776. Taunton: UK Hydrographic Office, 1968
- South Shetland Islands. Scale 1:200000 topographic map No. 3373. DOS 610 - W 62 58. Tolworth, UK, 1968
- Antarctic Digital Database (ADD). Scale 1:250000 topographic map of Antarctica. Scientific Committee on Antarctic Research (SCAR). Since 1993, regularly upgraded and updated
