= Solar eclipse of November 3, 2013 =

Total eclipse

- Hybrid eclipse
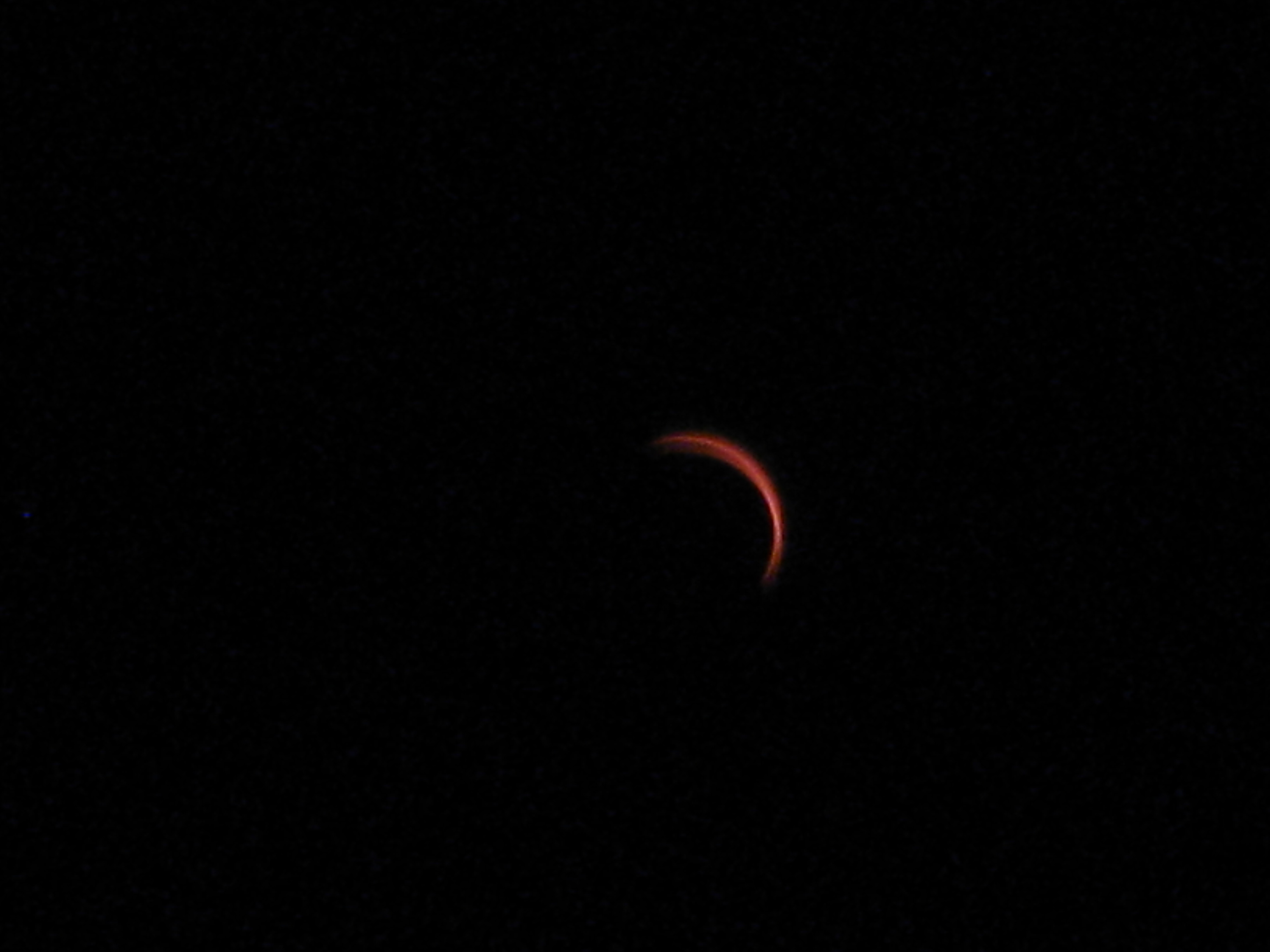
- Partial from Libreville, Gabon

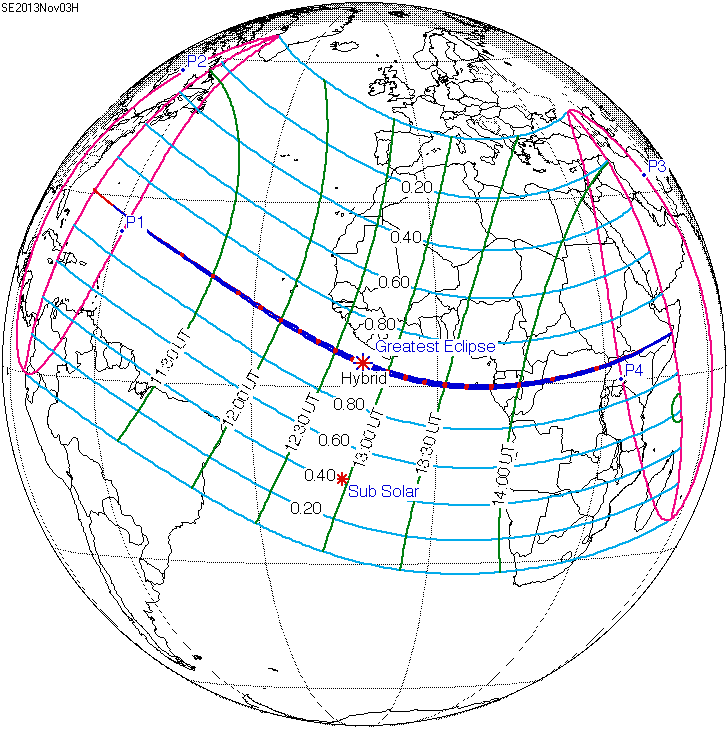
- Map
- Gamma: 0.3272
- Magnitude: 1.0159

Maximum eclipse
- Duration: 100 s (1 min 40 s)
- Coordinates: 3.5°N 11.7°W
- Max. width of band: 58 km (36 mi)

Times (UTC)
- (P1) Partial begin: 10:04:34
- (U1) Total begin: 11:05:17
- Greatest eclipse: 12:47:36
- (U4) Total end: 14:27:42
- (P4) Partial end: 15:28:21

References
- Saros: 143 (23 of 72)
- Catalog # (SE5000): 9538

A total solar eclipse occurred at the Moon's ascending node of orbit on Sunday, November 3, 2013, with a magnitude of 1.0159. It was a hybrid event, a narrow total eclipse, and beginning as an annular eclipse and concluding as a total eclipse, in this particular case. A solar eclipse occurs when the Moon passes between Earth and the Sun, thereby totally or partly obscuring the image of the Sun for a viewer on Earth. A hybrid solar eclipse is a rare type of solar eclipse that changes its appearance from annular to total and back as the Moon's shadow moves across the Earth's surface. Totality occurs between the annularity paths across the surface of the Earth, with the partial solar eclipse visible over a surrounding region thousands of kilometres wide. Occurring about 2.9 days before perigee (on November 6, 2013, at 9:20 UTC), the Moon's apparent diameter was larger.

== Visibility ==
Animation of eclipse path.

Totality was visible from the northern Atlantic Ocean (east of Florida) to Africa (Gabon (landfall), the Republic of the Congo, the Democratic Republic of the Congo, Uganda, South Sudan, Kenya, Ethiopia, Somalia), with a maximum duration of totality of 1 minute and 39 seconds, visible from the Atlantic Ocean south of Ivory Coast and Ghana.

Places with partial darkening were the eastern coast of North America, southern Greenland, Bermuda, the Caribbean islands, Costa Rica, Panama, northern South America, almost all the African continent, the Iberian Peninsula, Italy, Greece, Malta, Southern Russia, the Caucasus, Turkey and the Middle East.

This solar eclipse happened simultaneously with the 2013 Abu Dhabi Grand Prix, and it was possible to observe a partial solar eclipse in Abu Dhabi before the sunset while the F1 race took place, as shown briefly during its broadcast.

== Eclipse timing ==
=== Places experiencing total eclipse ===
Solar Eclipse of November 3, 2013 (Local Times)
Country or territory	City or place	Start of partial eclipse	Start of total eclipse	Maximum eclipse	End of total eclipse	End of partial eclipse	Duration of totality (min:s)	Duration of eclipse (hr:min)	Maximum magnitude
Democratic Republic of the Congo	Mbandaka	13:38:51	15:07:58	15:08:04	15:08:10	16:23:04	0:12	2:44	1.0004
Uganda	Gulu	16:07:37	17:23:00	17:23:10	17:23:20	18:27:56	0:20	2:20	1.0024

=== Places experiencing partial eclipse ===
Solar Eclipse of November 3, 2013 (Local Times)
Country or territory	City or place	Start of partial eclipse	Maximum eclipse	End of partial eclipse	Duration of eclipse (hr:min)	Maximum coverage
Bermuda	Hamilton	06:38:03 (sunrise)	07:07:26	08:14:04	1:36	86.17%
United States	New York City	06:28:58 (sunrise)	06:32:00	07:11:10	0:42	45.80%
Cape Verde	Praia	09:31:14	10:59:53	12:39:31	3:08	82.40%
Senegal	Dakar	10:43:29	12:16:18	13:56:51	3:13	72.27%
Gambia	Banjul	10:45:41	12:20:01	14:01:28	3:16	74.83%
Guinea-Bissau	Bissau	10:48:30	12:24:39	14:07:03	3:19	78.47%
Guinea	Conakry	10:54:12	12:33:02	14:16:12	3:22	83.40%
Sierra Leone	Freetown	10:56:02	12:35:44	14:19:06	3:23	86.17%
Liberia	Monrovia	11:03:58	12:46:02	14:28:48	3:25	90.12%
Ivory Coast	Yamoussoukro	11:19:40	13:03:22	14:41:58	3:22	81.44%
Ivory Coast	Abidjan	11:24:39	13:09:05	14:46:47	3:22	85.55%
Ghana	Accra	11:36:57	13:20:48	14:54:34	3:18	81.66%
Togo	Lomé	11:41:26	13:24:33	14:56:37	3:15	78.68%
Benin	Porto-Novo	12:46:02	14:28:20	15:58:45	3:13	76.68%
Nigeria	Lagos	12:48:33	14:30:28	16:00:05	3:12	76.49%
São Tomé and Príncipe	São Tomé	12:03:56	13:44:30	15:10:47	3:07	98.38%
Equatorial Guinea	Malabo	13:08:16	14:47:06	16:11:19	3:03	85.28%
Gabon	Libreville	13:12:40	14:50:56	16:14:23	3:02	98.05%
Cameroon	Yaoundé	13:17:03	14:53:19	16:14:41	2:58	84.98%
Republic of the Congo	Brazzaville	13:34:07	15:04:37	16:21:08	2:47	84.78%
Democratic Republic of the Congo	Kinshasa	13:34:15	15:04:41	16:21:09	2:47	84.54%
Central African Republic	Bangui	13:37:32	15:06:27	16:21:12	2:44	85.20%
South Sudan	Juba	16:05:38	17:21:48	18:27:02	2:21	91.94%
Rwanda	Kigali	15:06:21	16:22:40	17:28:05	2:22	84.26%
Burundi	Gitega	15:07:07	16:22:49	17:27:48	2:21	78.60%
Uganda	Kampala	16:09:18	17:24:06	18:28:21	2:19	90.86%
Ethiopia	Addis Ababa	16:14:18	17:24:17	18:02:08 (sunset)	1:48	82.51%
Djibouti	Djibouti	16:17:58	17:24:29	17:41:42 (sunset)	1:24	77.17%
Kenya	Nairobi	16:16:30	17:26:58	18:21:08 (sunset)	2:05	80.69%
Somalia	Mogadishu	16:23:54	17:28:58	17:43:26 (sunset)	1:20	84.85%

== Gallery ==
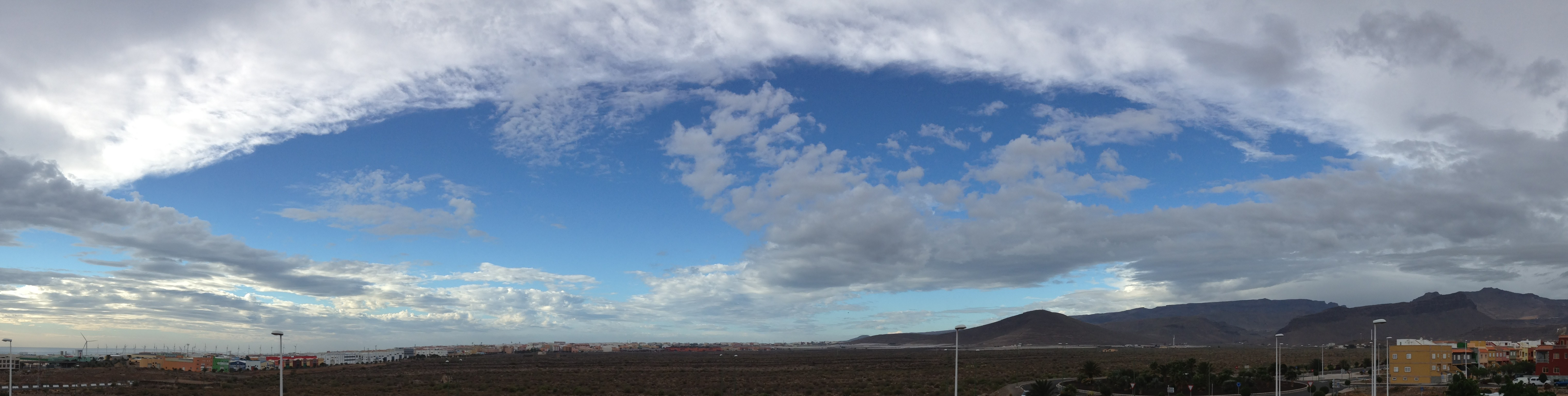
Wind angle view in Agüimes, Las Palmas during the eclipse
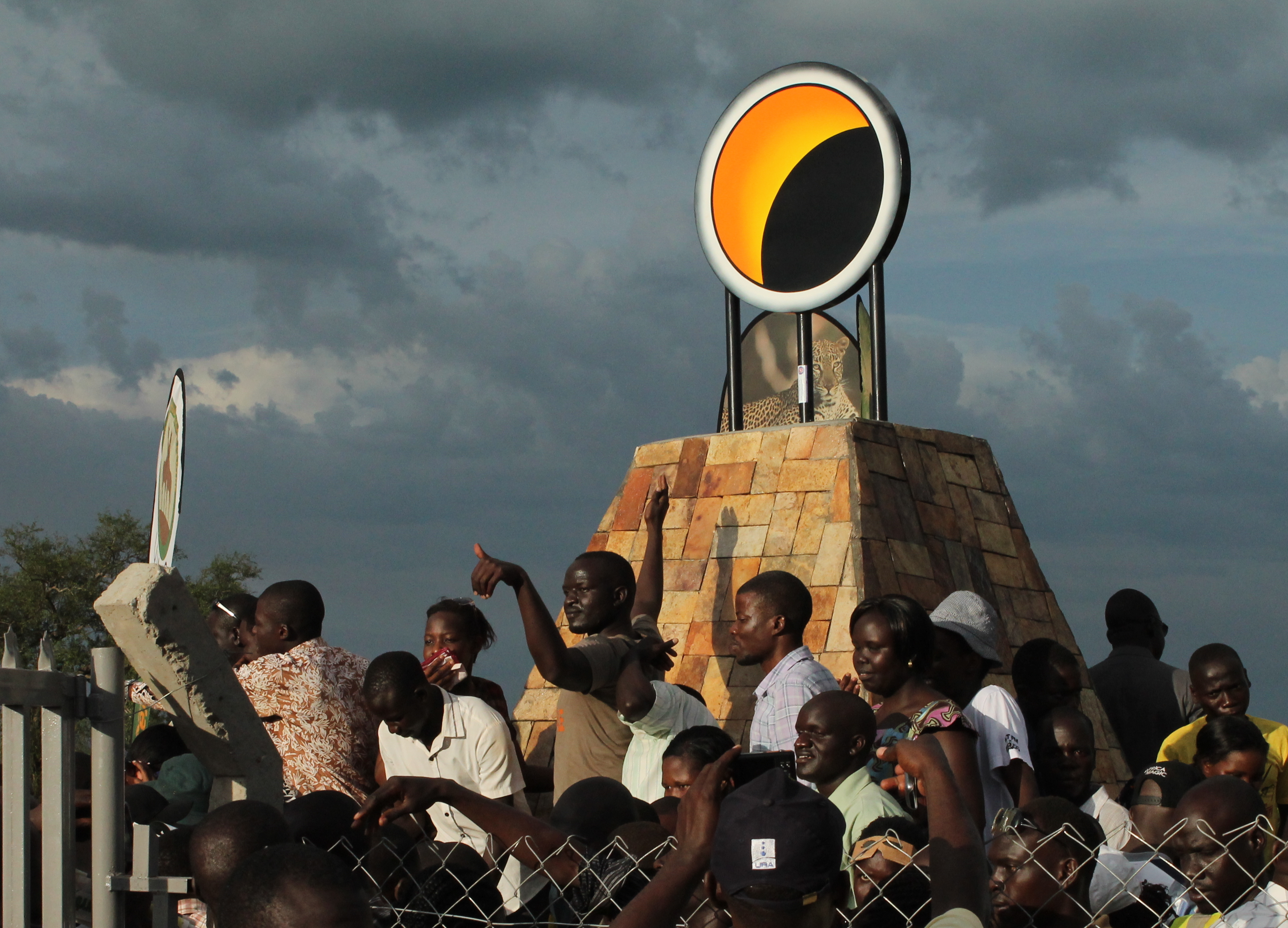
An eclipse monument in Pakwach, Uganda

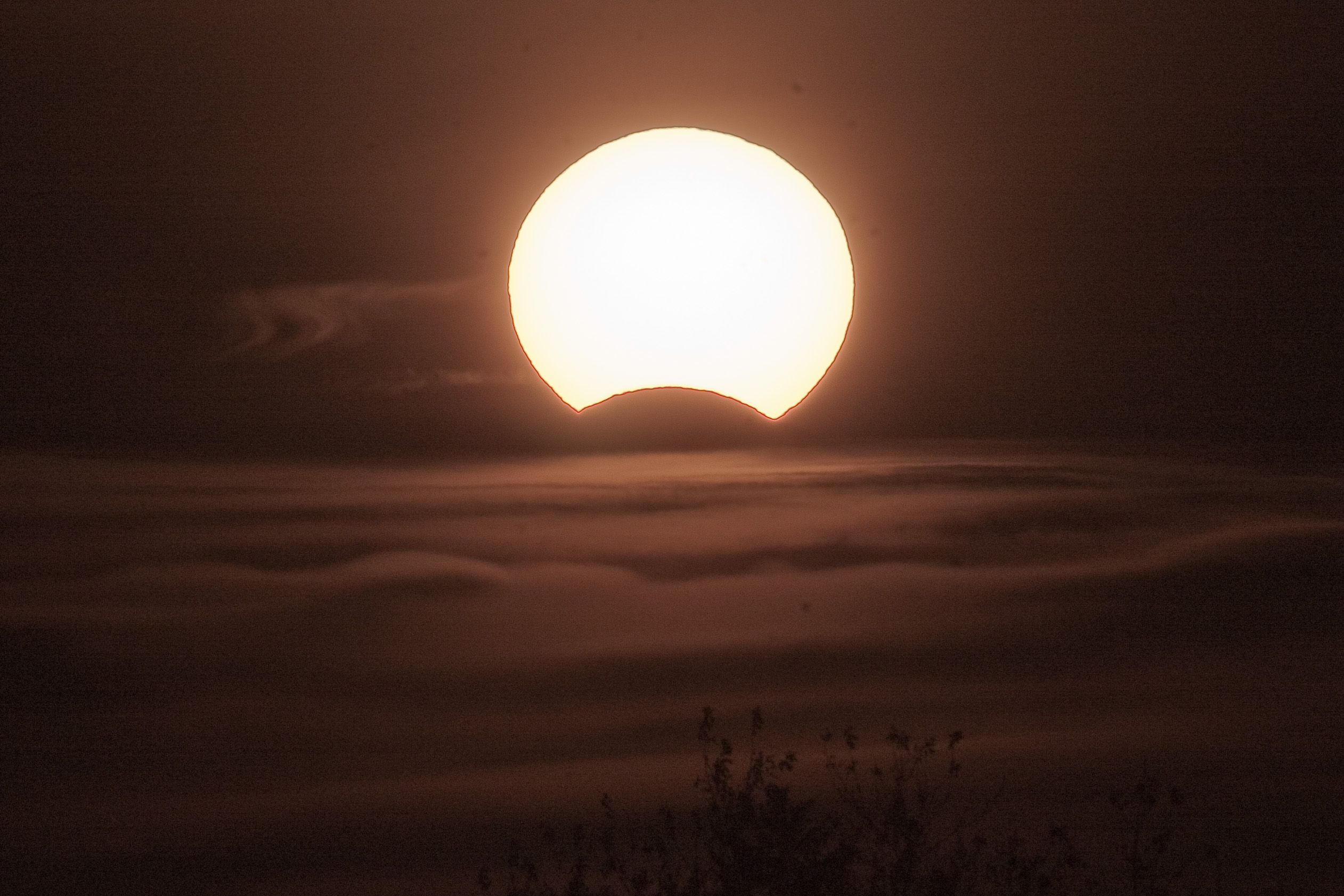
From Ottawa, Canada at sunrise, 11:24 UTC

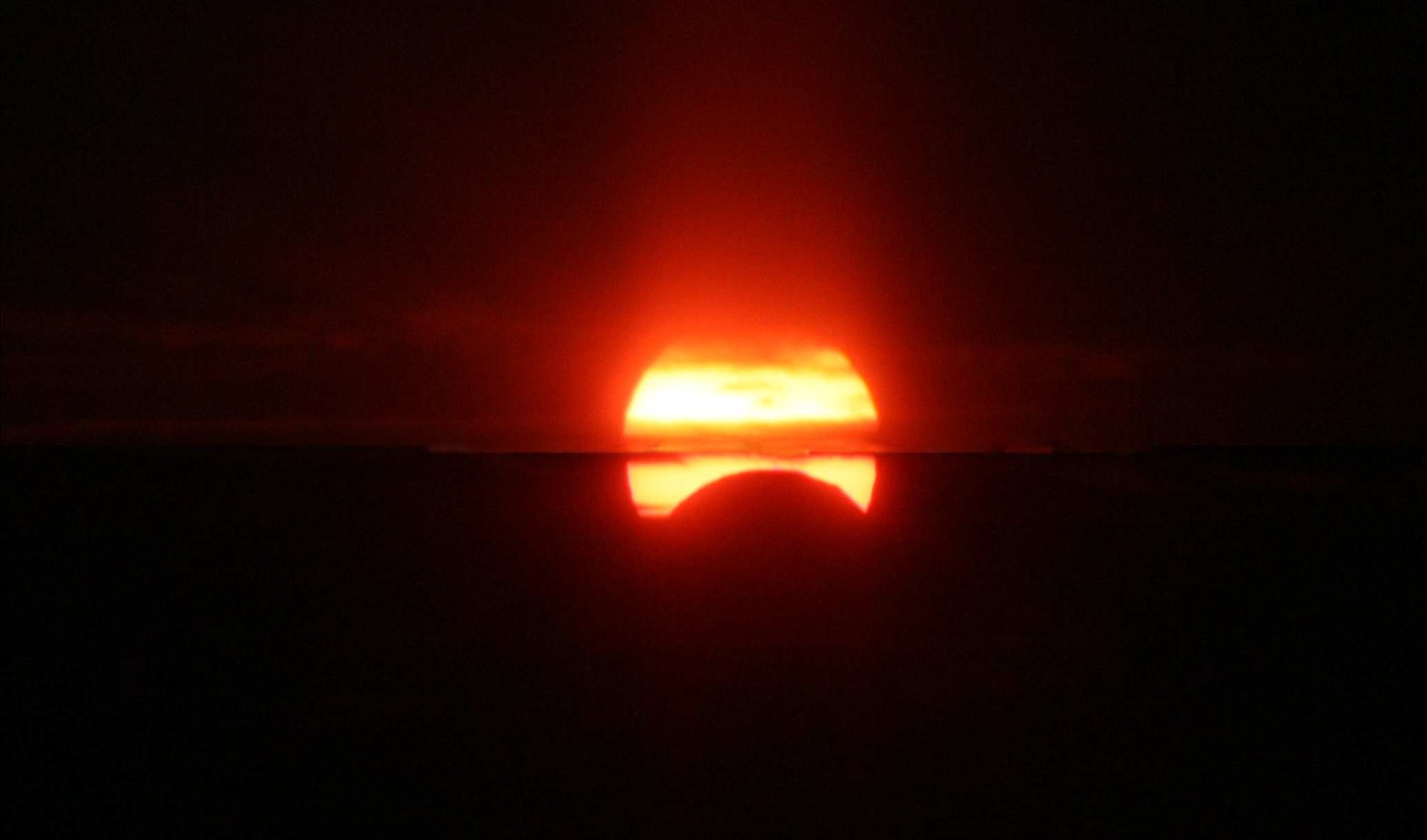
From Liberty State Park, New Jersey at sunrise, 11:37 UTC

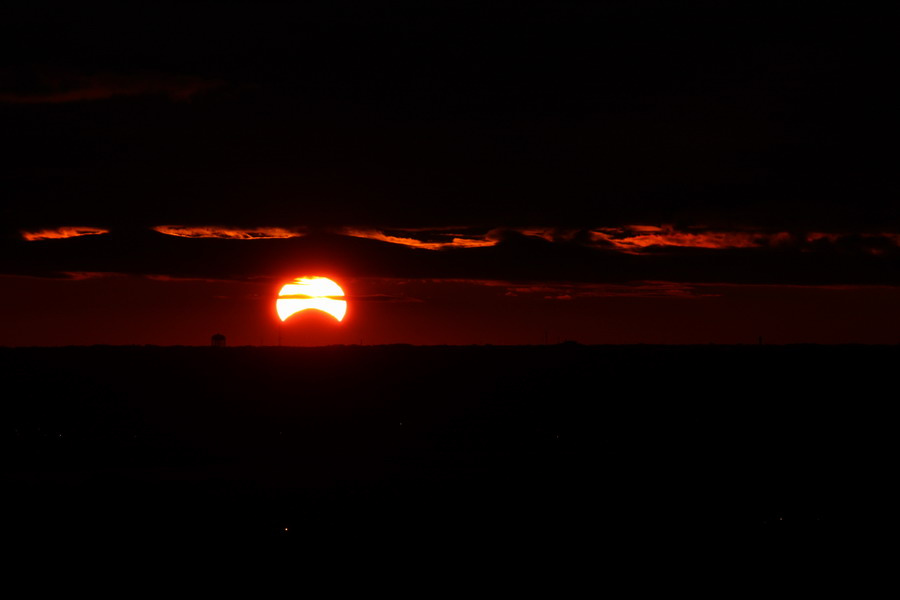
From Arlington, Virginia at sunrise, 11:40 UTC

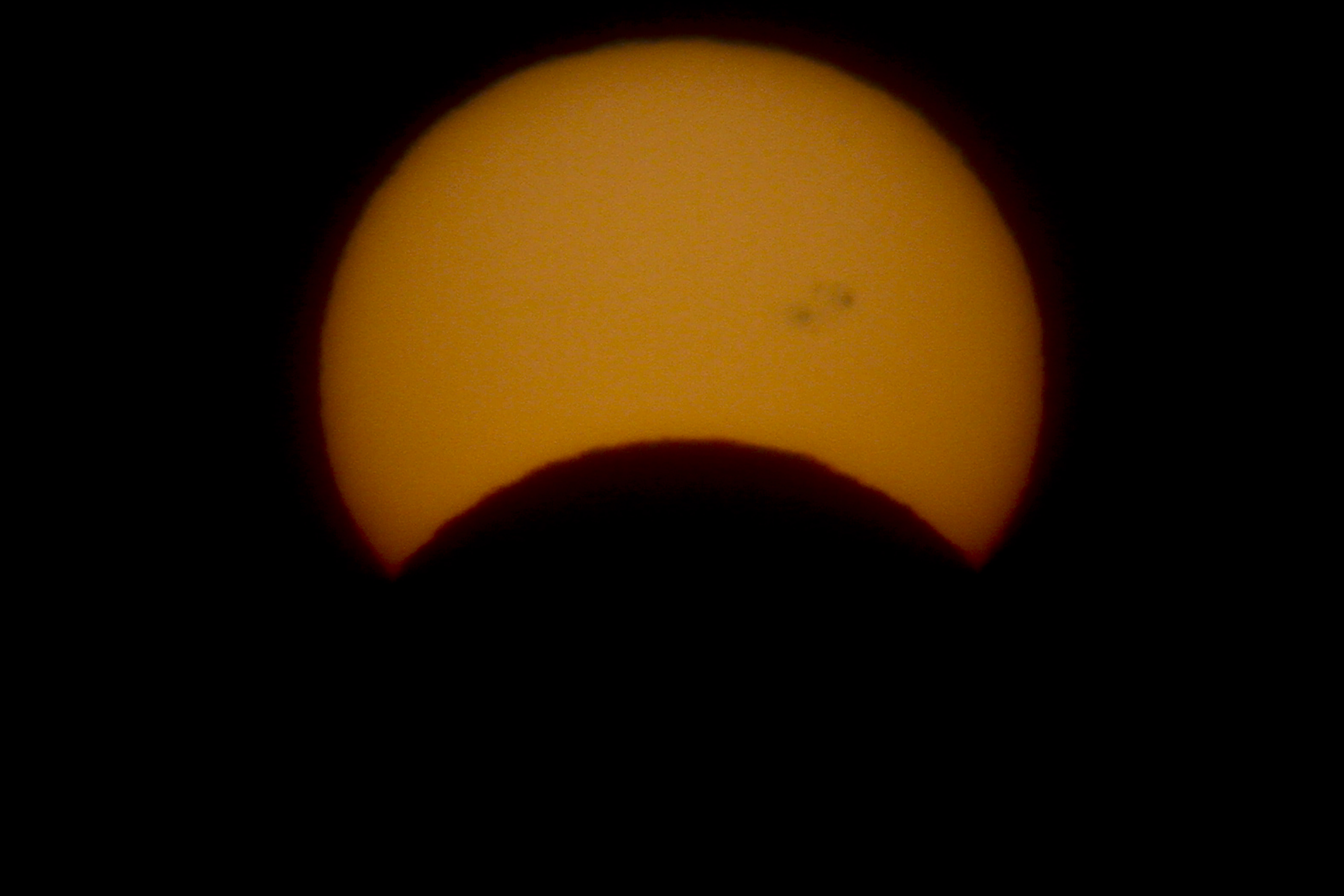
From Egg Harbor Township, New Jersey at sunrise, 11:40 UTC

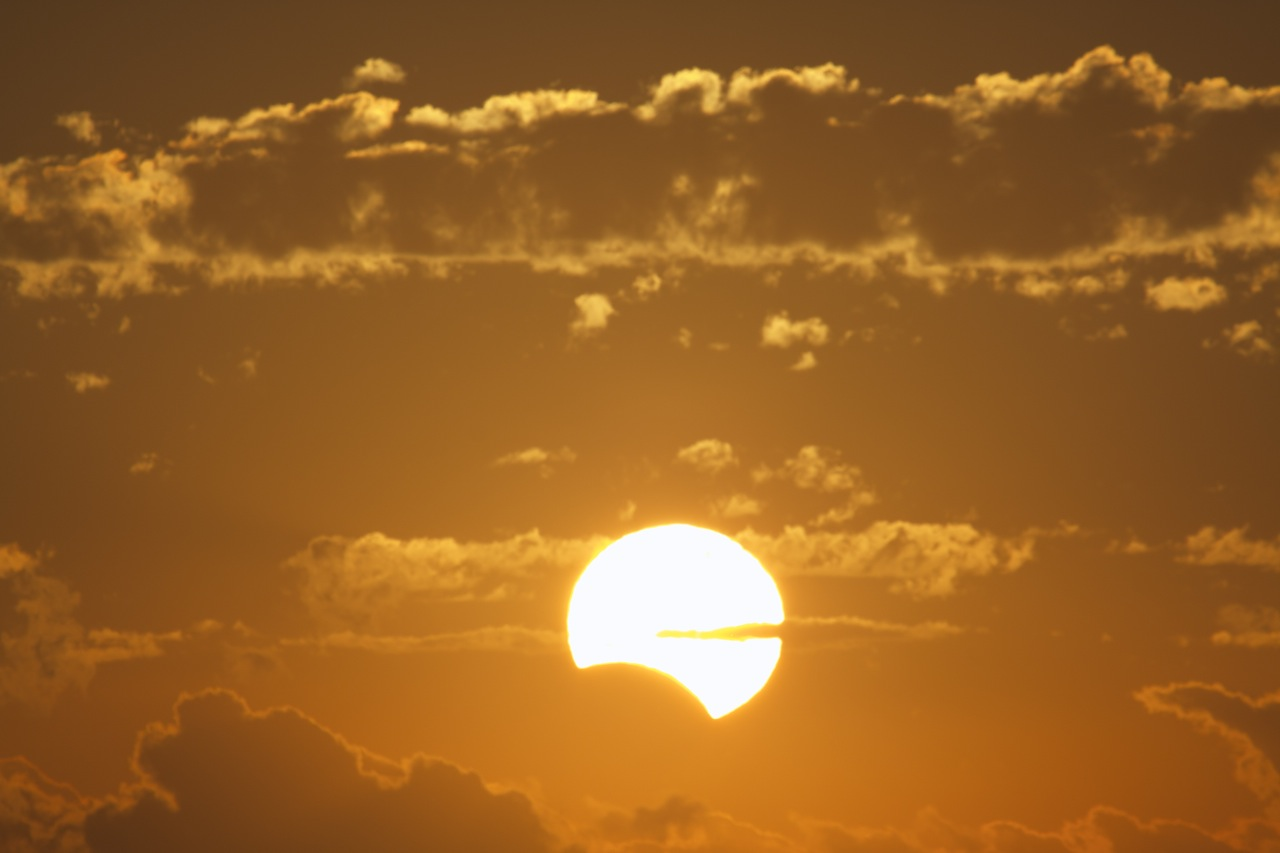
From Melbourne, Florida at sunrise, 11:45 UTC

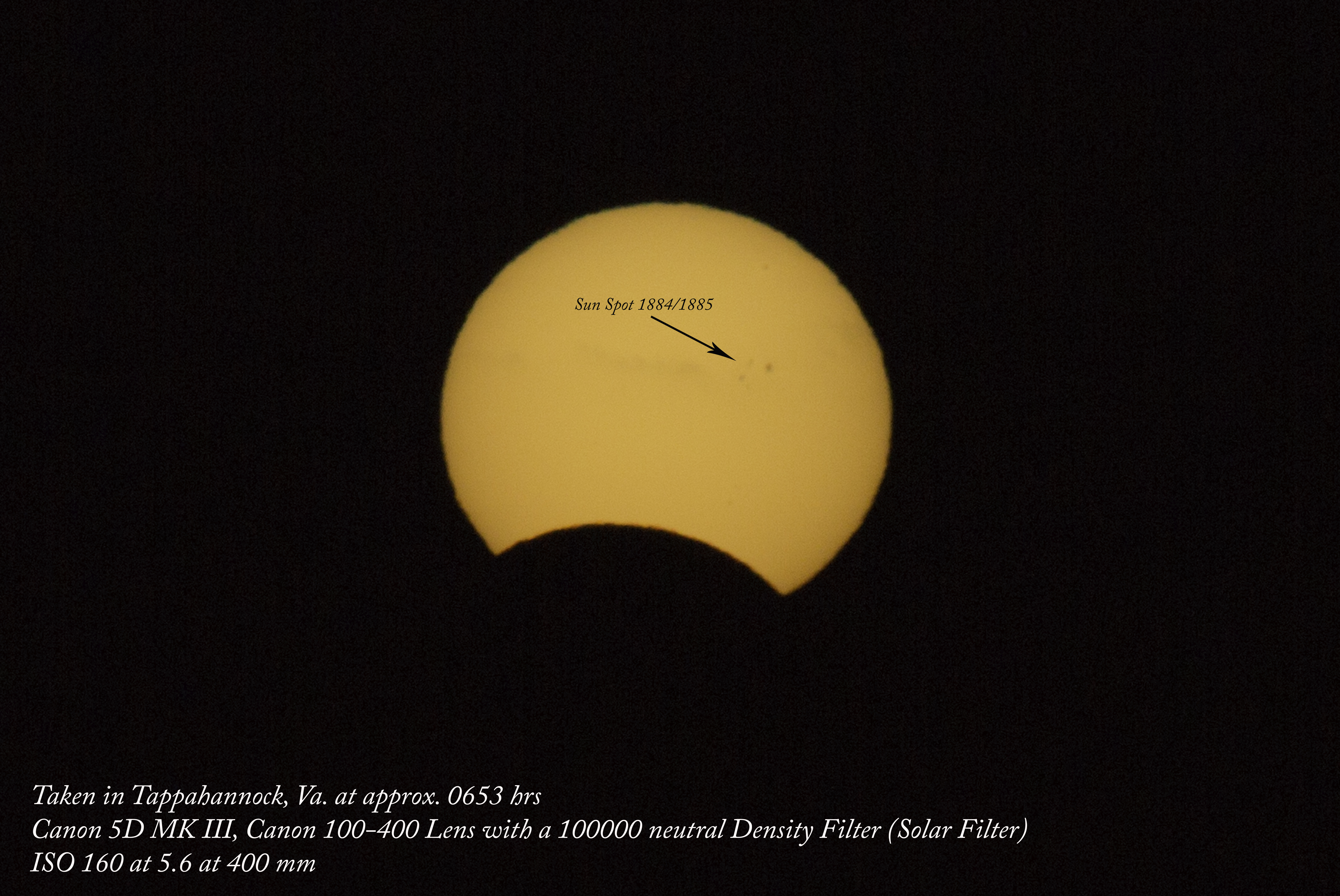
From Tappahannock, Virginia at sunrise, 11:53 UTC

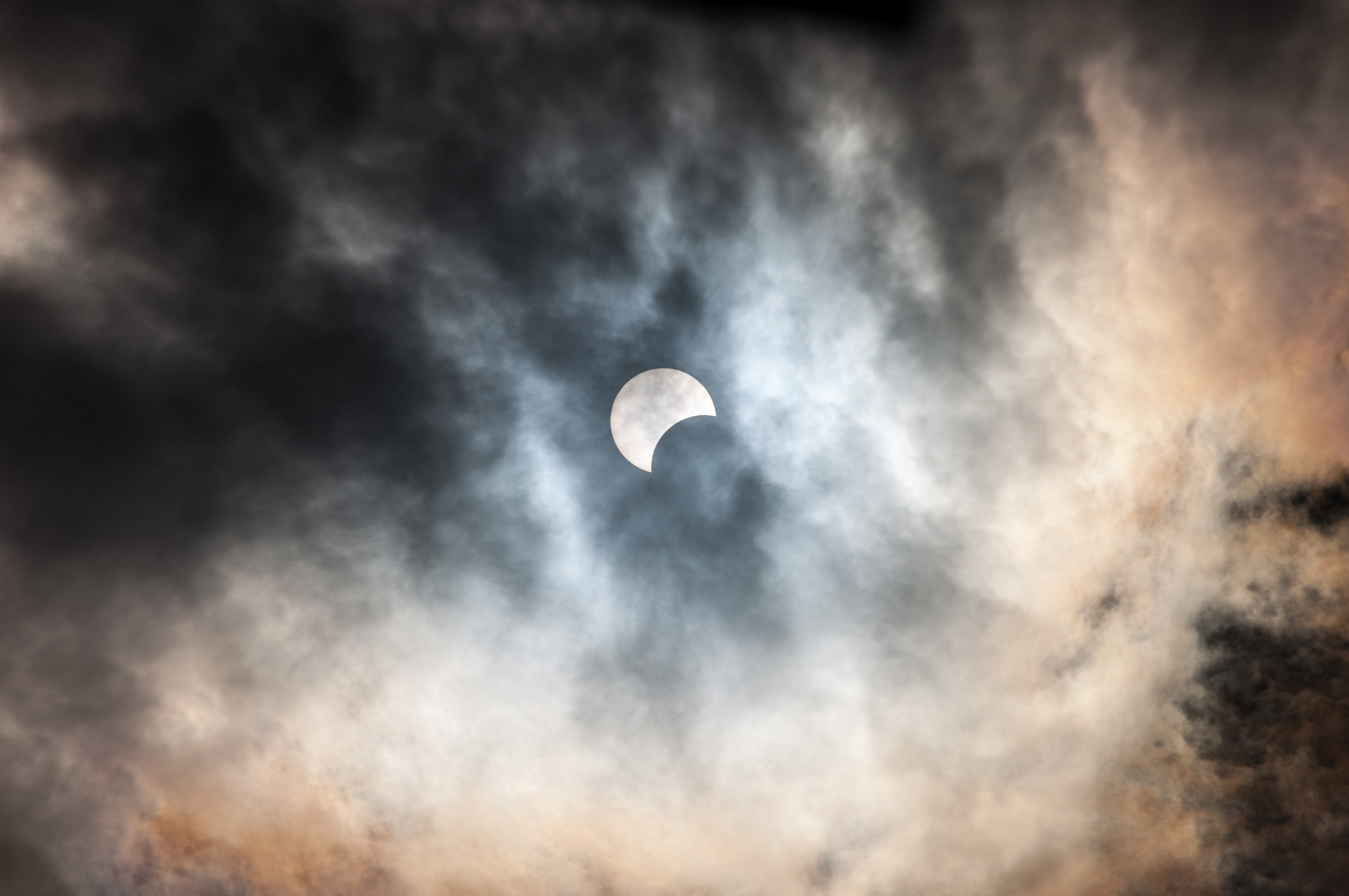
Partial from Las Palmas, Canary Islands, 12:01 UTC

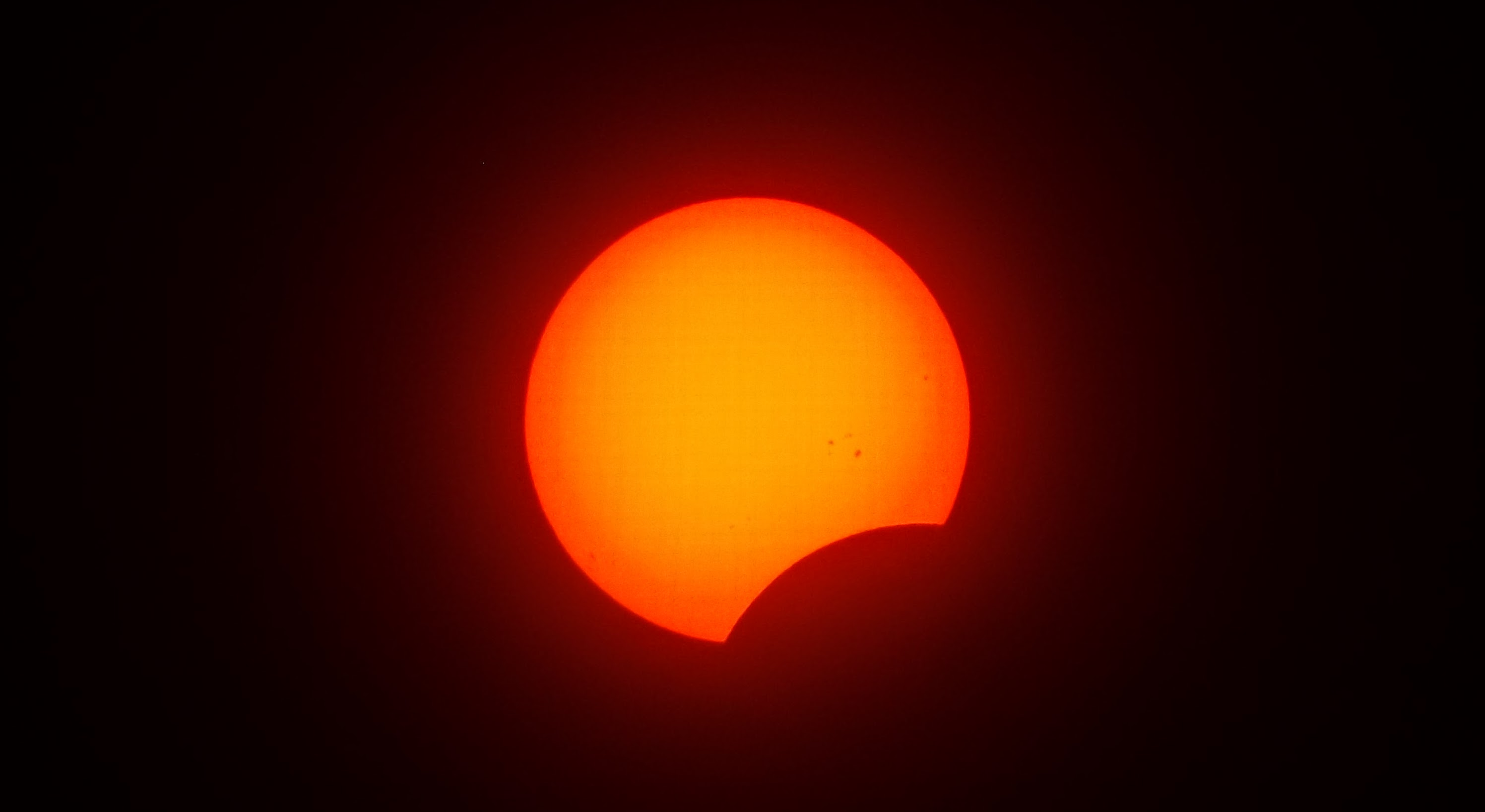
Partial from Tétouan, Morocco, 12:27 UTC

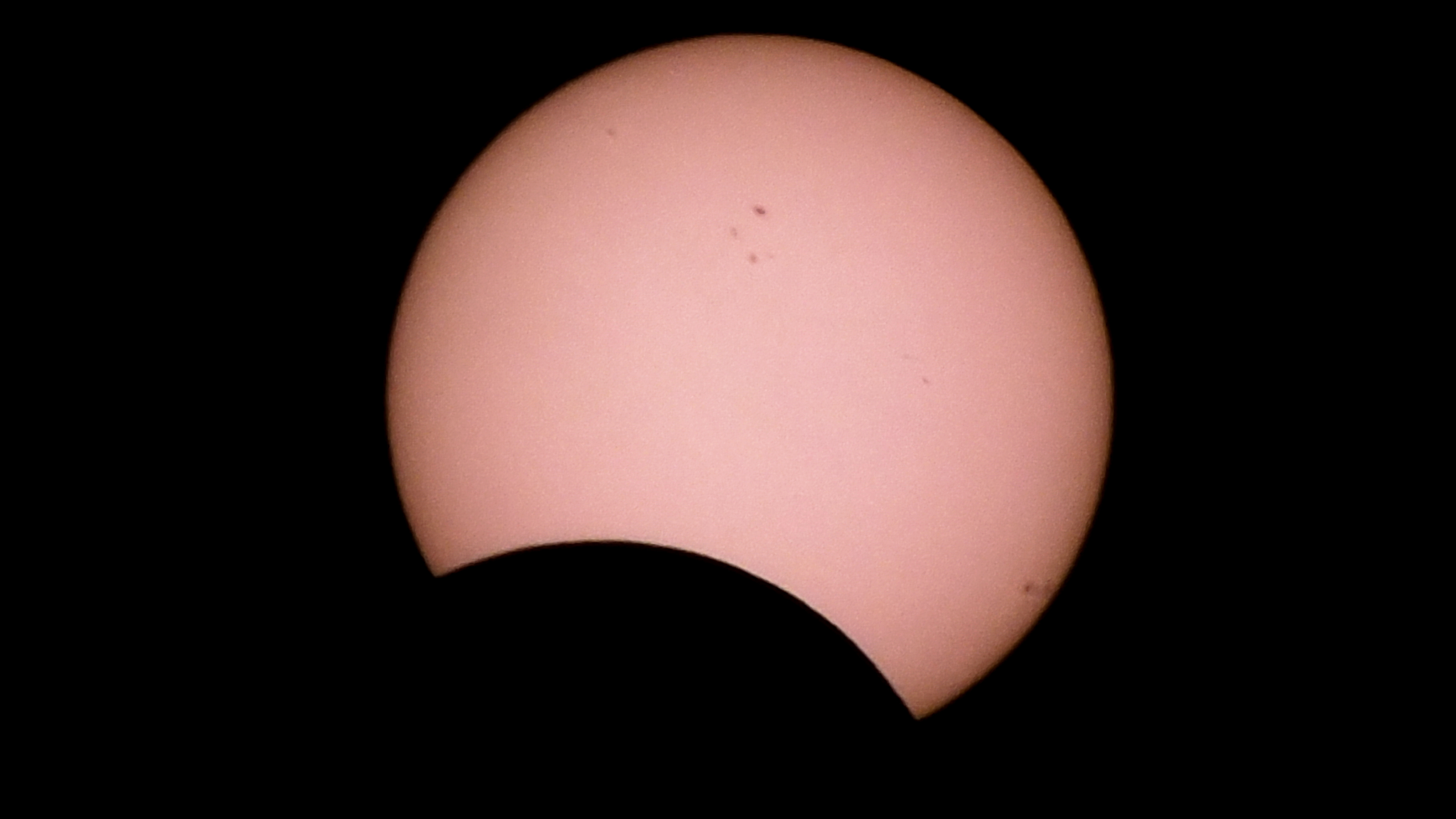
Partial from Bayeux, Brazil, 12:35 UTC

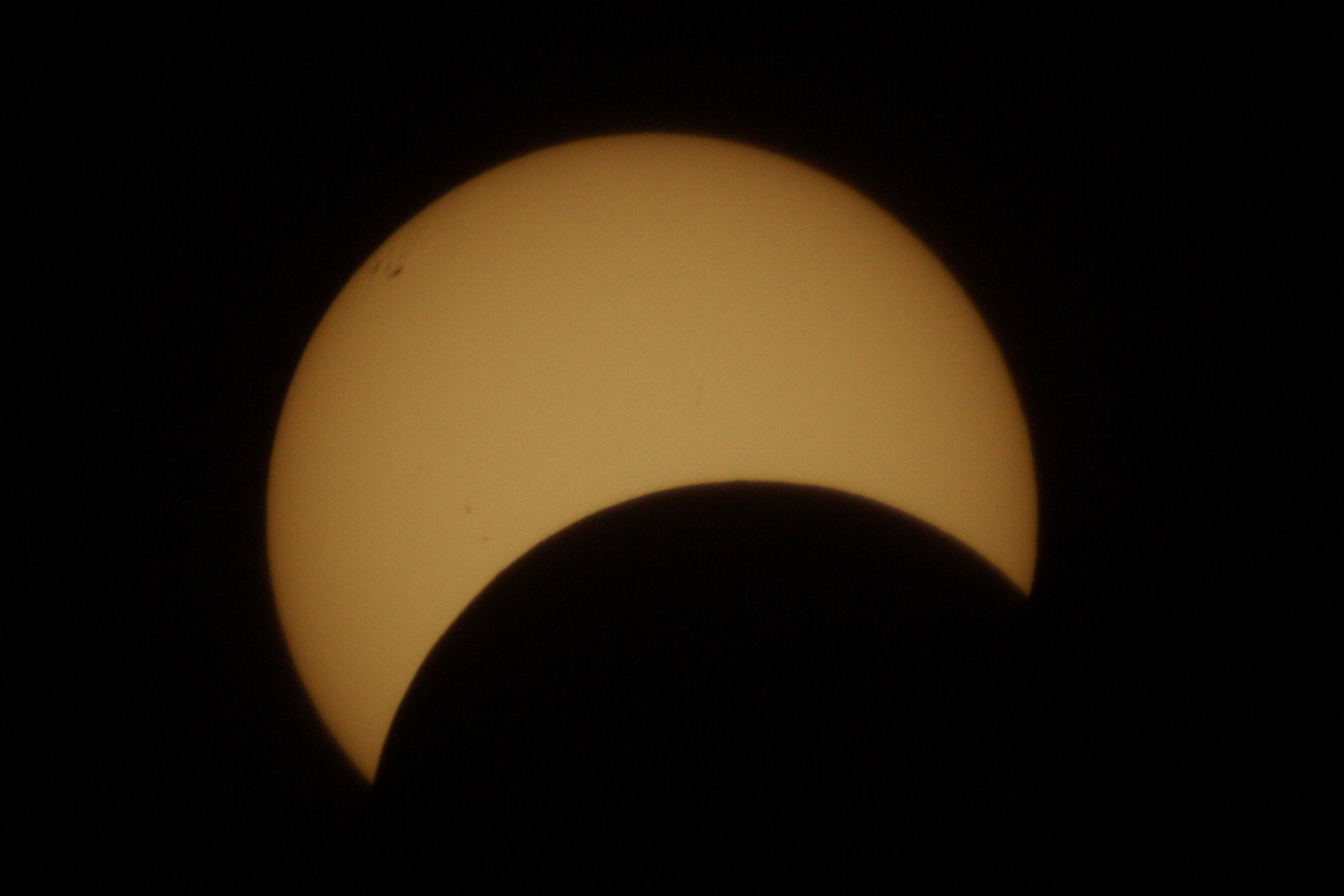
Partial from Lake Turkana, Kenya, 13:54 UTC

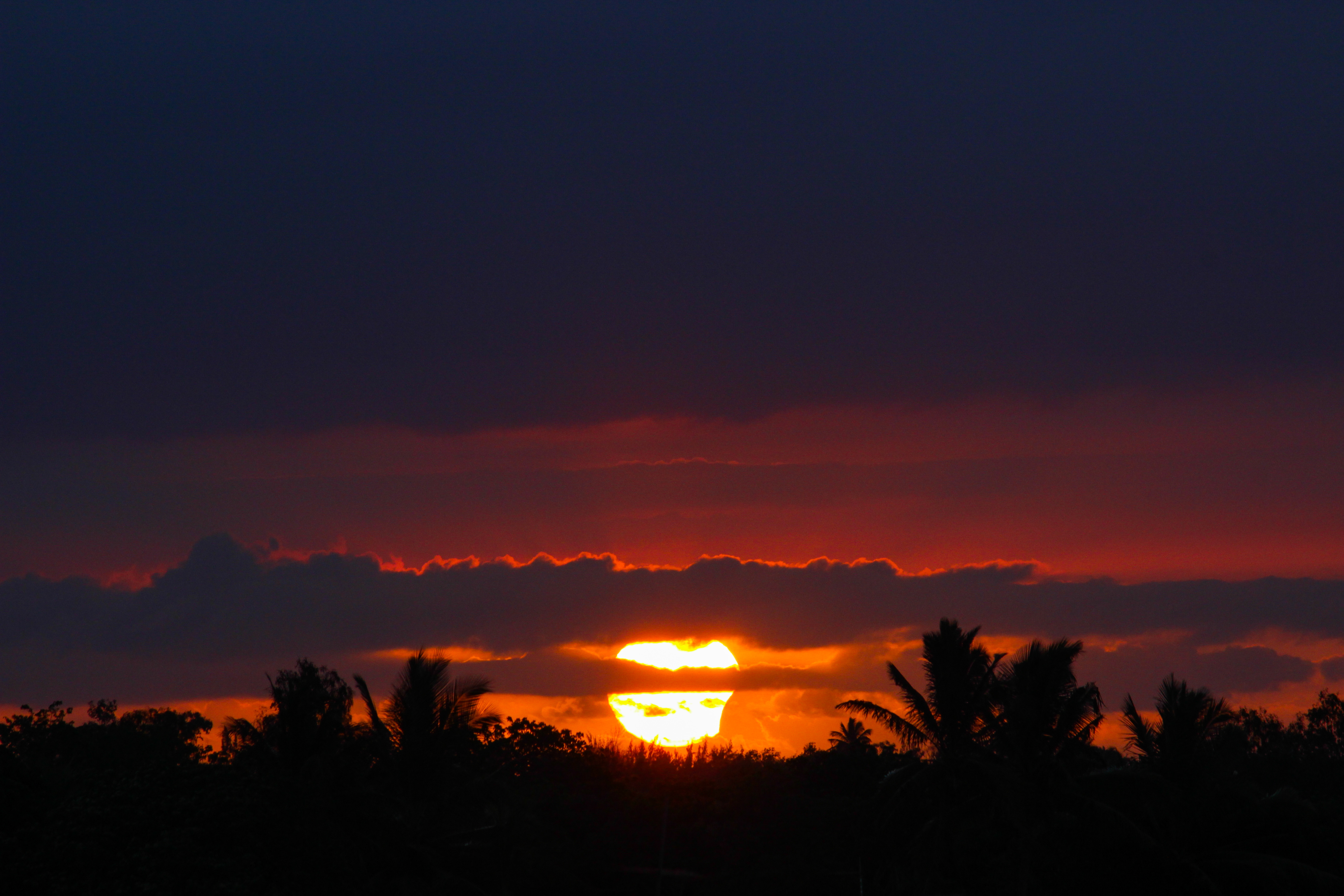
From Triolet, Mauritius at sunset, 14:18 UTC

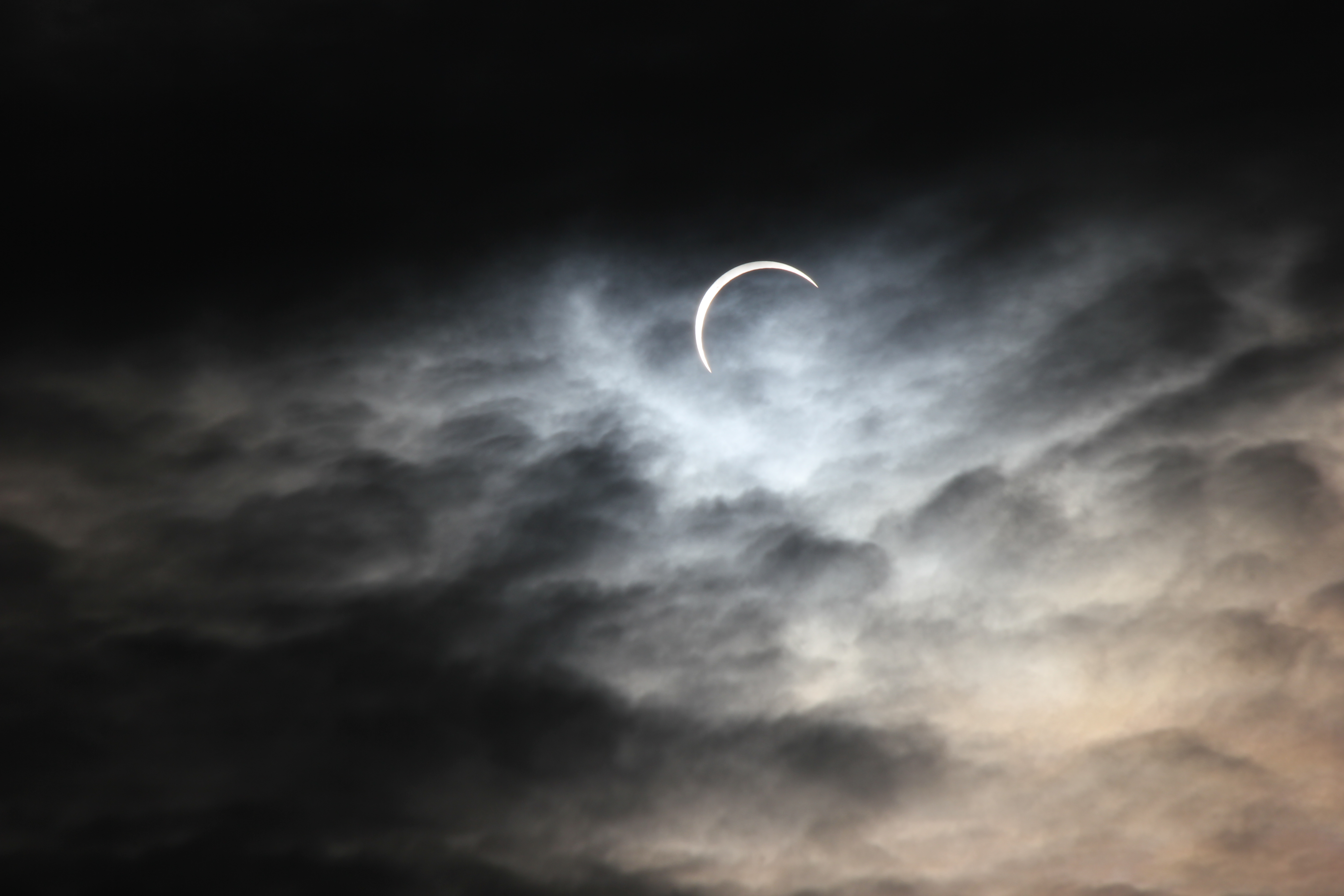
From Bunia, DR Congo at greatest eclipse, 14:22 UTC

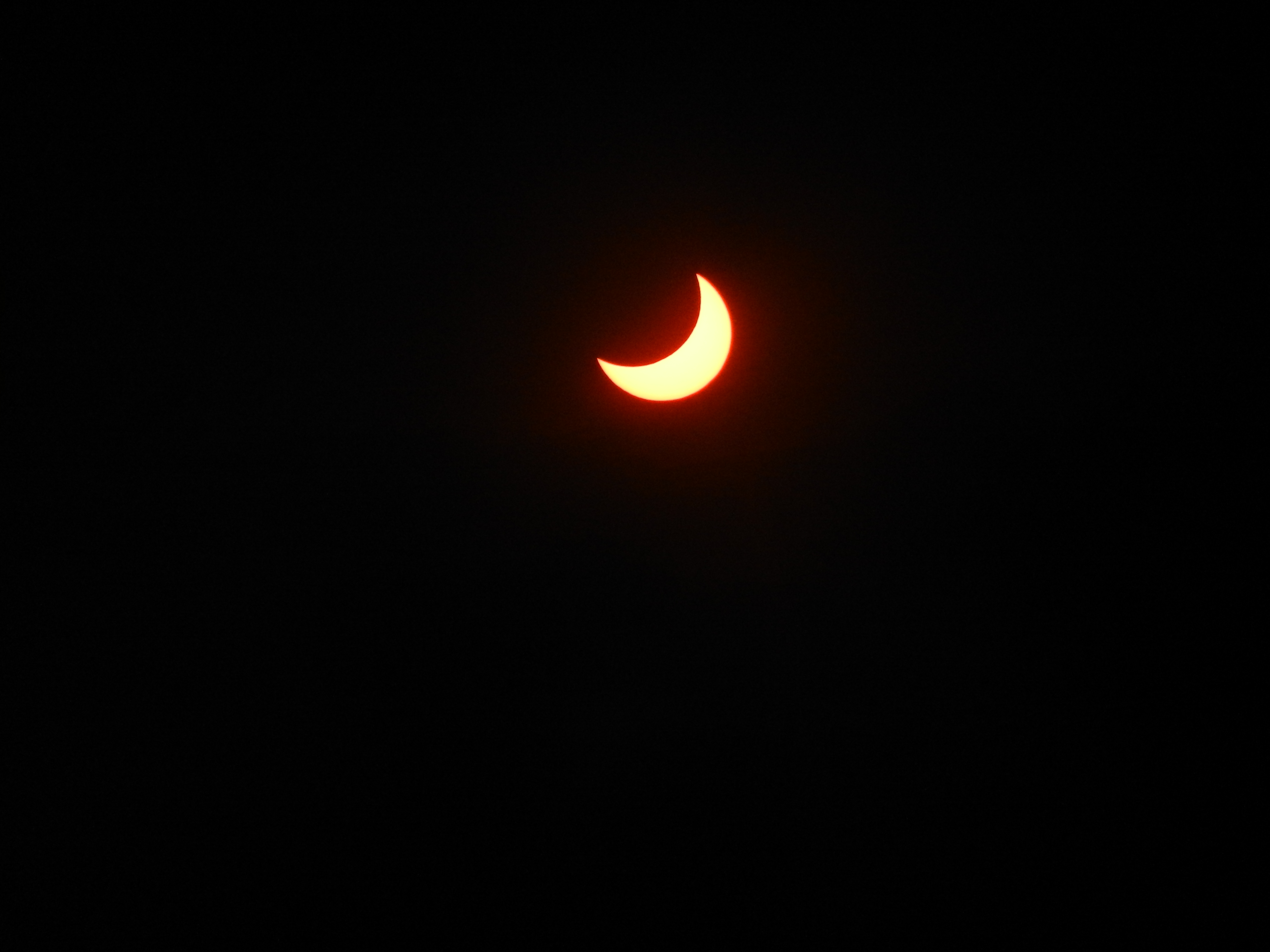
From Addis Ababa, Ethiopia at sunset, 14:50 UTC

== Eclipse details ==
Shown below are two tables displaying details about this particular solar eclipse. The first table outlines times at which the Moon's penumbra or umbra attains the specific parameter, and the second table describes various other parameters pertaining to this eclipse.

November 3, 2013 Solar Eclipse Times
Event	Time (UTC)
First Penumbral External Contact	2013 November 3 at 10:05:41.2 UTC
First Umbral External Contact	2013 November 3 at 11:06:24.6 UTC
First Central Line	2013 November 3 at 11:06:26.7 UTC
First Umbral Internal Contact	2013 November 3 at 11:06:28.9 UTC
First Penumbral Internal Contact	2013 November 3 at 12:14:17.3 UTC
Equatorial Conjunction	2013 November 3 at 12:39:54.2 UTC
Greatest Eclipse	2013 November 3 at 12:47:36.1 UTC
Ecliptic Conjunction	2013 November 3 at 12:51:04.5 UTC
Greatest Duration	2013 November 3 at 12:51:58.3 UTC
Last Penumbral Internal Contact	2013 November 3 at 13:21:08.2 UTC
Last Umbral Internal Contact	2013 November 3 at 14:28:50.1 UTC
Last Central Line	2013 November 3 at 14:28:50.4 UTC
Last Umbral External Contact	2013 November 3 at 14:28:50.8 UTC
Last Penumbral External Contact	2013 November 3 at 15:29:29.3 UTC

November 3, 2013 Solar Eclipse Parameters
Parameter	Value
Eclipse Magnitude	1.01587
Eclipse Obscuration	1.03200
Gamma	0.32715
Sun Right Ascension	14h35m19.9s
Sun Declination	-15°12'22.5"
Sun Semi-Diameter	16'07.4"
Sun Equatorial Horizontal Parallax	08.9"
Moon Right Ascension	14h35m37.0s
Moon Declination	-14°53'30.7"
Moon Semi-Diameter	16'07.6"
Moon Equatorial Horizontal Parallax	0°59'11.0"
ΔT	67.2 s

== Eclipse season ==
This eclipse is part of an eclipse season, a period, roughly every six months, when eclipses occur. Only two (or occasionally three) eclipse seasons occur each year, and each season lasts about 35 days and repeats just short of six months (173 days) later; thus two full eclipse seasons always occur each year. Either two or three eclipses happen each eclipse season. In the sequence below, each eclipse is separated by a fortnight.

Eclipse season of October–November 2013
October 18 Descending node (full moon)	November 3 Ascending node (new moon)
Penumbral lunar eclipse Lunar Saros 117	Hybrid solar eclipse Solar Saros 143

== Related eclipses ==
=== Eclipses in 2013 ===
- A partial lunar eclipse on April 25.
- An annular solar eclipse on May 10.
- A penumbral lunar eclipse on May 25.
- A penumbral lunar eclipse on October 18.
- A hybrid solar eclipse on November 3.

=== Metonic ===
- Preceded by: Solar eclipse of January 15, 2010
- Followed by: Solar eclipse of August 21, 2017

=== Tzolkinex ===
- Preceded by: Solar eclipse of September 22, 2006
- Followed by: Solar eclipse of December 14, 2020

=== Half-Saros ===
- Preceded by: Lunar eclipse of October 28, 2004
- Followed by: Lunar eclipse of November 8, 2022

=== Tritos ===
- Preceded by: Solar eclipse of December 4, 2002
- Followed by: Solar eclipse of October 2, 2024

=== Solar Saros 143 ===
- Preceded by: Solar eclipse of October 24, 1995
- Followed by: Solar eclipse of November 14, 2031

=== Inex ===
- Preceded by: Solar eclipse of November 22, 1984
- Followed by: Solar eclipse of October 14, 2042

=== Triad ===
- Preceded by: Solar eclipse of January 3, 1927
- Followed by: Solar eclipse of September 4, 2100

=== Solar eclipses of 2011–2014 ===
This eclipse is a member of a semester series. An eclipse in a semester series of solar eclipses repeats approximately every 177 days and 4 hours (a semester) at alternating nodes of the Moon's orbit.

The partial solar eclipses on January 4, 2011 and July 1, 2011 occur in the previous lunar year eclipse set.

Solar eclipse series sets from 2011 to 2014
Descending node			Ascending node		
Saros	Map	Gamma	Saros	Map	Gamma
118 Partial in Tromsø, Norway	June 1, 2011 Partial	1.21300	123 Hinode XRT footage	November 25, 2011 Partial	−1.05359
128 Annularity in Red Bluff, CA, USA	May 20, 2012 Annular	0.48279	133 Totality in Mount Carbine, Queensland, Australia	November 13, 2012 Total	−0.37189
138 Annularity in Churchills Head, Australia	May 10, 2013 Annular	−0.26937	143 Partial in Libreville, Gabon	November 3, 2013 Hybrid	0.32715
148 Partial in Adelaide, Australia	April 29, 2014 Annular (non-central)	−0.99996	153 Partial in Minneapolis, MN, USA	October 23, 2014 Partial	1.09078

=== Saros 143 ===
This eclipse is a part of Saros series 143, repeating every 18 years, 11 days, and containing 72 events. The series started with a partial solar eclipse on March 7, 1617. It contains total eclipses from June 24, 1797 through October 24, 1995; hybrid eclipses from November 3, 2013 through December 6, 2067; and annular eclipses from December 16, 2085 through September 16, 2536. The series ends at member 72 as a partial eclipse on April 23, 2897. Its eclipses are tabulated in three columns; every third eclipse in the same column is one exeligmos apart, so they all cast shadows over approximately the same parts of the Earth.

The longest duration of totality was produced by member 16 at 3 minutes, 50 seconds on August 19, 1887, and the longest duration of annularity will be produced by member 51 at 4 minutes, 54 seconds on September 6, 2518. All eclipses in this series occur at the Moon’s ascending node of orbit.

Series members 12–33 occur between 1801 and 2200:
12	13	14
July 6, 1815	July 17, 1833	July 28, 1851
15	16	17
August 7, 1869	August 19, 1887	August 30, 1905
18	19	20
September 10, 1923	September 21, 1941	October 2, 1959
21	22	23
October 12, 1977	October 24, 1995	November 3, 2013
24	25	26
November 14, 2031	November 25, 2049	December 6, 2067
27	28	29
December 16, 2085	December 29, 2103	January 8, 2122
30	31	32
January 20, 2140	January 30, 2158	February 10, 2176
33
February 21, 2194

=== Metonic series ===
The metonic series repeats eclipses every 19 years (6939.69 days), lasting about 5 cycles. Eclipses occur in nearly the same calendar date. In addition, the octon subseries repeats 1/5 of that or every 3.8 years (1387.94 days). All eclipses in this table occur at the Moon's ascending node.

20 eclipse events between June 10, 1964 and August 21, 2036
June 10–11	March 28–29	January 14–16	November 3	August 21–22
117	119	121	123	125
June 10, 1964	March 28, 1968	January 16, 1972	November 3, 1975	August 22, 1979
127	129	131	133	135
June 11, 1983	March 29, 1987	January 15, 1991	November 3, 1994	August 22, 1998
137	139	141	143	145
June 10, 2002	March 29, 2006	January 15, 2010	November 3, 2013	August 21, 2017
147	149	151	153	155
June 10, 2021	March 29, 2025	January 14, 2029	November 3, 2032	August 21, 2036

=== Tritos series ===
This eclipse is a part of a tritos cycle, repeating at alternating nodes every 135 synodic months (≈ 3986.63 days, or 11 years minus 1 month). Their appearance and longitude are irregular due to a lack of synchronization with the anomalistic month (period of perigee), but groupings of 3 tritos cycles (≈ 33 years minus 3 months) come close (≈ 434.044 anomalistic months), so eclipses are similar in these groupings.

Series members between 1801 and 2200
June 16, 1806 (Saros 124)	May 16, 1817 (Saros 125)	April 14, 1828 (Saros 126)	March 15, 1839 (Saros 127)	February 12, 1850 (Saros 128)
January 11, 1861 (Saros 129)	December 12, 1871 (Saros 130)	November 10, 1882 (Saros 131)	October 9, 1893 (Saros 132)	September 9, 1904 (Saros 133)
August 10, 1915 (Saros 134)	July 9, 1926 (Saros 135)	June 8, 1937 (Saros 136)	May 9, 1948 (Saros 137)	April 8, 1959 (Saros 138)
March 7, 1970 (Saros 139)	February 4, 1981 (Saros 140)	January 4, 1992 (Saros 141)	December 4, 2002 (Saros 142)	November 3, 2013 (Saros 143)
October 2, 2024 (Saros 144)	September 2, 2035 (Saros 145)	August 2, 2046 (Saros 146)	July 1, 2057 (Saros 147)	May 31, 2068 (Saros 148)
May 1, 2079 (Saros 149)	March 31, 2090 (Saros 150)	February 28, 2101 (Saros 151)	January 29, 2112 (Saros 152)	December 28, 2122 (Saros 153)
November 26, 2133 (Saros 154)	October 26, 2144 (Saros 155)	September 26, 2155 (Saros 156)	August 25, 2166 (Saros 157)	July 25, 2177 (Saros 158)
June 24, 2188 (Saros 159)	May 24, 2199 (Saros 160)			

=== Inex series ===
This eclipse is a part of the long period inex cycle, repeating at alternating nodes, every 358 synodic months (≈ 10,571.95 days, or 29 years minus 20 days). Their appearance and longitude are irregular due to a lack of synchronization with the anomalistic month (period of perigee). However, groupings of 3 inex cycles (≈ 87 years minus 2 months) comes close (≈ 1,151.02 anomalistic months), so eclipses are similar in these groupings.

Series members between 1801 and 2200
March 24, 1811 (Saros 136)	March 4, 1840 (Saros 137)	February 11, 1869 (Saros 138)
January 22, 1898 (Saros 139)	January 3, 1927 (Saros 140)	December 14, 1955 (Saros 141)
November 22, 1984 (Saros 142)	November 3, 2013 (Saros 143)	October 14, 2042 (Saros 144)
September 23, 2071 (Saros 145)	September 4, 2100 (Saros 146)	August 15, 2129 (Saros 147)
July 25, 2158 (Saros 148)	July 6, 2187 (Saros 149)	
