= The Face (Whitaker novel) =

2002 novel by Phil Whitaker

- First edition
- Author: Phil Whitaker
- Language: English
- Publisher: Atlantic Books
- Publication date: 2002

The Face is the third novel by English author Phil Whitaker. It was published in 2002 by Atlantic Books.

== Plot ==
Zoe received a redirected card from her dead father Declan Barr. It contained a sketch of herself and her father as she recognised a photograph on her father's mantelpiece. Her father Ray Arthur was a retired detective, recently killed when he drove his car at high speed into a bridge abutment. The novel contains extracts from Ray Arthur's inquest. Zoe returns to her home in Nottingham with her husband Paul and her young daughter Holly to try and make sense of her father's death. Meanwhile, Declan, a former police artist writes about his imaginations about Zoe, his experiences in Nottingham and his relationship with Zoe's father. Declan then writes about a crime when a man committed sodomy on Mary Scanlon, a nine-year-old girl, the daughter of a councillor and an ex-mayor. Ray Arthur led the investigation and together they decided who was the culprit. Zoe has managed to track down Declan but he refuses to co-operate with her...

== Reception ==
- D. J. Taylor writing in The Independent has misgivings: "Though crisply written and full of arresting images, there are several drawbacks to this novel. The first is simply the inevitability of dad's involvement in the bygone miscarriage of justice: once the hints have been dropped, the exposure is only a matter of time. The second is the drabness of landscape and material: a vista of sleazy Nottingham pubs and cheerless roadside hotels, where everything comes drenched in spiritual cigarette smoke. Nothing wrong with drabness, of course, a principal building-block of the English novel since George Gissing: it is merely that Whitaker does very little with his inert surroundings...In an odd way, there is another kind of novel struggling to get out from beneath The Face, one about the pressures of thirtysomething urban family life, where interest and affection is in permanent danger of being extinguished by the sheer stress of keeping going.
- Ian Sansom also has mixed feelings as he writes in The Guardian: "The book is appalling in its detail, steady in its gaze, and deeply penetrating in its insight into flesh and blood...As in his other novels, Whitaker is attempting to resurrect the past: in this instance, and in particular, a dreary 1970s Nottingham." Sansom concludes: "It takes some writers whole novels to convince you that they have any genuine sense of the past. Whitaker saves his energies for plots. He should probably be writing screenplays. To say much more about The Face would be to begin to unravel the skein. Suffice it to say that there is a terrible miscarriage of justice, and that there are things that flesh and blood cannot bear."
