= Slavotin Point =

Location of Nelson Island in the South Shetland Islands

Slavotin Point is a low rocky point on the southeast coast of Nelson Island in the South Shetland Islands, Antarctica forming the east side of the entrance to Tuida Cove and the west side of the entrance to Vichina Cove.

== Name ==
The point is named (Bulgarian: нос Славотин, romanized: Nos Slavotin) after the settlement of Slavotin in northwestern Bulgaria.

== Location ==
Slavotin Point is located at 62°19′39″S 58°54′31.5″W, which is:

- 4.47 km (2.78 mi) west-southwest of Duthoit Point
- 4.17 km (2.59 mi) east-northeast of Ivan Alexander Point
- 11.31 km (7.03 mi) east by north of Ross Point.

British mapping in 1968.

== Maps ==
- South Shetland Islands. Scale 1:200000 topographic map No. 3373. DOS 610 - W 62 58. Tolworth, UK, 1968.
- Antarctic Digital Database (ADD). Scale 1:250000 topographic map of Antarctica. Scientific Committee on Antarctic Research (SCAR). Since 1993, regularly upgraded and updated.
