= Solar eclipse of November 3, 1994 =

Total eclipse

- Total eclipse
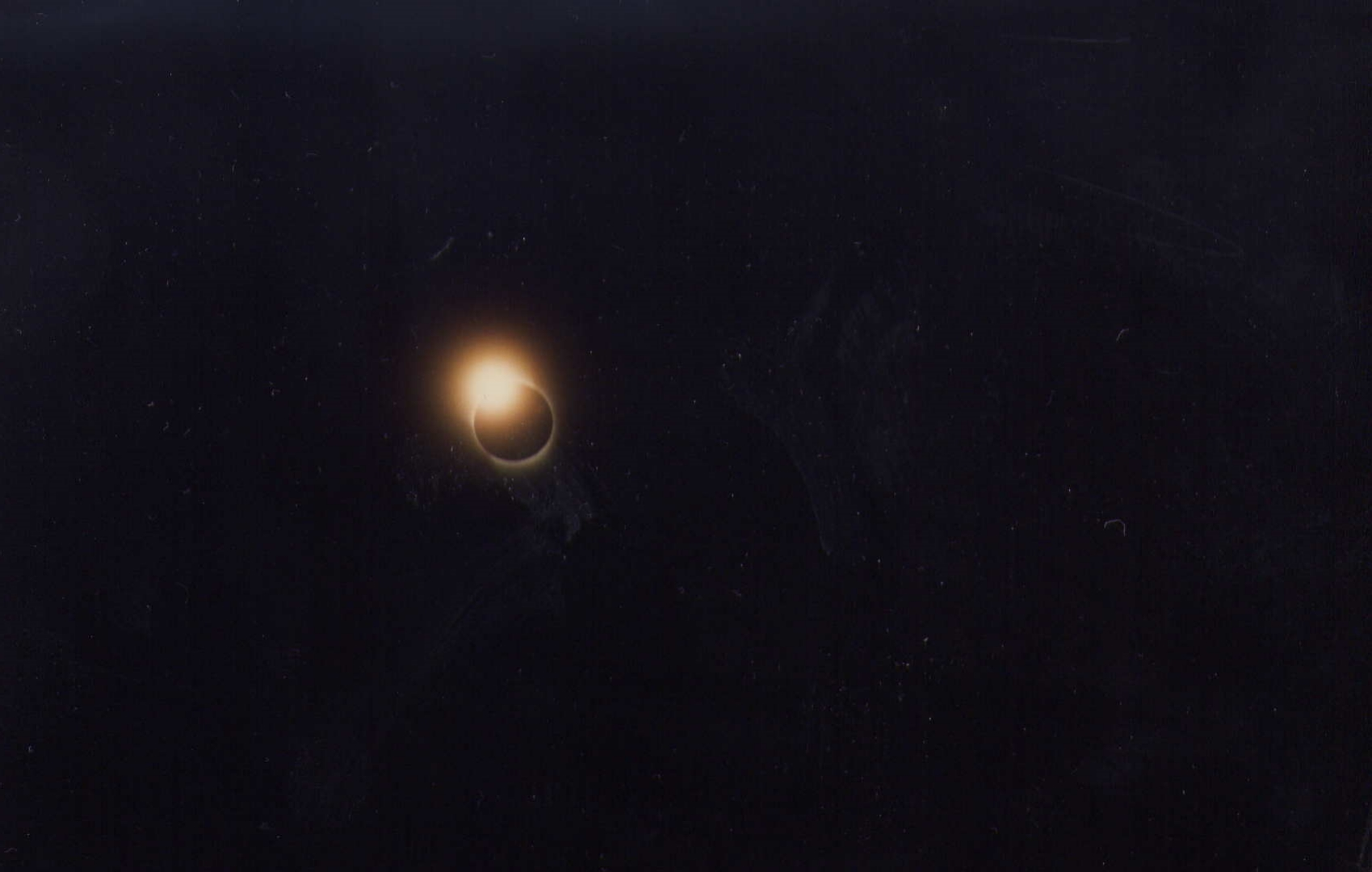
- Totality with diamond ring effect in Litoral Province, Bolivia

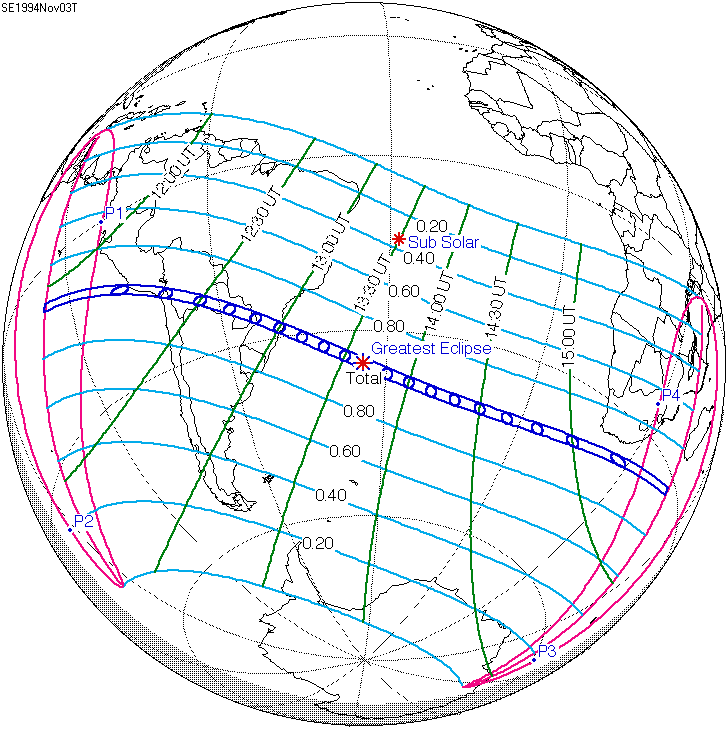
- Map
- Gamma: −0.3522
- Magnitude: 1.0535

Maximum eclipse
- Duration: 263 s (4 min 23 s)
- Coordinates: 35.4°S 34.2°W
- Max. width of band: 189 km (117 mi)

Times (UTC)
- Greatest eclipse: 13:40:06

References
- Saros: 133 (44 of 72)
- Catalog # (SE5000): 9496

A total solar eclipse occurred at the Moon's ascending node of orbit on Thursday, November 3, 1994, with a magnitude of 1.0535. A solar eclipse occurs when the Moon passes between Earth and the Sun, thereby totally or partly obscuring the image of the Sun for a viewer on Earth. A total solar eclipse occurs when the Moon's apparent diameter is larger than the Sun's, blocking all direct sunlight, turning day into darkness. Totality occurs in a narrow path across Earth's surface, with the partial solar eclipse visible over a surrounding region thousands of kilometres wide. Occurring about 10 hours after perigee (on November 3, 1994, at 23:40 UTC), the Moon's apparent diameter was larger.

Totality was visible in Peru, northern Chile, Bolivia, northern Argentina, Paraguay, Brazil and Gough Island of British overseas territory of Saint Helena, Ascension and Tristan da Cunha. The Iguazu Falls, one of the largest waterfalls systems in the world, lay in the path of totality. A partial eclipse was visible for parts of Central America, South America, Antarctica, and Southern Africa.

== Observations ==
Jay Pasachoff led an observation team from Williams College in Massachusetts, observing the total eclipse at a military base near Putre, Chile, in the Atacama Desert. The team took images of the corona and measured its brightness. Teams from Japan and South Korea also conducted observations nearby. The Russian Academy of Sciences sent a team to Criciúma, Brazil, taking images of the corona in polarized light and proposing reconstruction of its ray structure.

== Eclipse timing ==
=== Places experiencing total eclipse ===
Solar Eclipse of November 3, 1994 (Local Times)
Country or territory	City or place	Start of partial eclipse	Start of total eclipse	Maximum eclipse	End of total eclipse	End of partial eclipse	Duration of totality (min:s)	Duration of eclipse (hr:min)	Maximum magnitude
Peru	Arequipa	06:14:46	07:15:56	07:16:15	07:16:35	08:25:44	0:39	2:11	1.0009
Chile	Arica	08:17:25	09:18:49	09:19:48	09:20:46	10:30:17	1:57	2:13	1.0061
Bolivia	Potosí	07:20:12	08:23:47	08:25:08	08:26:30	09:38:45	2:43	2:19	1.0115
Paraguay	Asunción	08:32:40	09:42:22	09:42:51	09:43:21	11:01:57	0:59	2:29	1.0013
Paraguay	Caraguatay	08:33:12	09:42:16	09:43:53	09:45:31	11:03:32	3:15	2:30	1.0136
Paraguay	Ciudad del Este	08:35:24	09:45:47	09:47:28	09:49:10	11:08:31	3:23	2:33	1.0142
Brazil	Foz do Iguaçu	09:35:28	10:45:51	10:47:33	10:49:16	12:08:38	3:25	2:33	1.0146
Brazil	Criciúma	09:45:28	10:58:46	11:00:47	11:02:49	12:24:16	4:03	2:39	1.0255

=== Places experiencing partial eclipse ===
Solar Eclipse of November 3, 1994 (Local Times)
Country or territory	City or place	Start of partial eclipse	Maximum eclipse	End of partial eclipse	Duration of eclipse (hr:min)	Maximum coverage
Colombia	Bogotá	06:08:03	06:55:47	07:48:15	1:40	32.05%
Ecuador	Galápagos Islands	05:37:33 (sunrise)	05:57:05	06:52:44	1:15	69.86%
Ecuador	Quito	06:05:12	06:57:28	07:55:23	1:50	54.12%
Colombia	Leticia	06:07:23	07:04:02	08:07:39	2:00	56.19%
Peru	Lima	06:10:01	07:08:15	08:13:37	2:04	94.49%
Bolivia	La Paz	07:15:44	08:18:54	09:30:30	2:15	96.11%
Chile	Iquique	08:19:40	09:22:16	10:32:54	2:13	96.40%
Bolivia	Sucre	07:19:42	08:24:49	09:38:42	2:19	99.39%
Chile	Antofagasta	08:24:33	09:26:55	10:36:57	2:12	85.24%
Paraguay	Pedro Juan Caballero	08:30:12	09:41:15	11:01:39	2:31	95.08%
Chile	Santiago	08:42:11	09:41:37	10:47:04	2:05	56.35%
Paraguay	Encarnación	08:37:14	09:48:30	11:08:24	2:31	97.60%
Argentina	Buenos Aires	08:48:54	09:56:35	11:11:07	2:22	71.07%
Brazil	São Paulo	09:41:33	10:57:48	12:22:49	2:41	82.18%
Uruguay	Montevideo	08:50:52	09:59:59	11:15:54	2:25	73.58%
Brazil	Rio de Janeiro	09:46:03	11:03:43	12:29:35	2:44	73.89%
South Georgia and the South Sandwich Islands	King Edward Point	10:48:38	11:50:39	12:53:27	2:05	39.73%
Saint Helena, Ascension and Tristan da Cunha	Edinburgh of the Seven Seas	13:03:19	14:25:50	15:42:52	2:40	92.88%
Bouvet Island	Bouvet Island	14:33:42	15:36:37	16:36:12	2:03	51.94%
Madagascar	Antananarivo	17:32:37	17:55:07	17:58:22 (sunset)	0:26	25.47%
French Southern and Antarctic Lands	Île de la Possession	19:11:52	20:01:38	20:27:46 (sunset)	1:16	51.99%
South Africa	Cape Town	16:00:38	17:08:14	18:08:57	2:08	86.75%
Namibia	Windhoek	16:14:02	17:15:01	18:09:34	1:56	42.15%
Lesotho	Maseru	16:14:37	17:16:32	18:12:23	1:58	75.77%
Madagascar	Toliara	17:27:57	18:17:03	18:19:29 (sunset)	0:52	66.89%
South Africa	Johannesburg	16:18:49	17:18:53	18:13:05	1:54	64.35%
Botswana	Gaborone	16:19:19	17:19:06	18:12:55	1:54	56.67%
Eswatini	Mbabane	16:20:38	17:19:38	18:13:03	1:53	67.57%
Mozambique	Maputo	16:21:50	17:20:08	18:07:26 (sunset)	1:46	67.51%
Zimbabwe	Harare	16:32:40	17:24:08	18:02:58 (sunset)	1:30	36.40%

== Eclipse details ==
Shown below are two tables displaying details about this particular solar eclipse. The first table outlines times at which the Moon's penumbra or umbra attains the specific parameter, and the second table describes various other parameters pertaining to this eclipse.

November 3, 1994 Solar Eclipse Times
Event	Time (UTC)
First Penumbral External Contact	1994 November 03 at 11:06:00.2 UTC
First Umbral External Contact	1994 November 03 at 12:02:38.7 UTC
First Central Line	1994 November 03 at 12:03:41.3 UTC
First Umbral Internal Contact	1994 November 03 at 12:04:44.0 UTC
First Penumbral Internal Contact	1994 November 03 at 13:09:15.5 UTC
Ecliptic Conjunction	1994 November 03 at 13:36:30.1 UTC
Greatest Eclipse	1994 November 03 at 13:40:06.0 UTC
Greatest Duration	1994 November 03 at 13:42:38.8 UTC
Equatorial Conjunction	1994 November 03 at 13:48:07.6 UTC
Last Penumbral Internal Contact	1994 November 03 at 14:10:44.2 UTC
Last Umbral Internal Contact	1994 November 03 at 15:15:21.7 UTC
Last Central Line	1994 November 03 at 15:16:24.9 UTC
Last Umbral External Contact	1994 November 03 at 15:17:28.1 UTC
Last Penumbral External Contact	1994 November 03 at 16:14:07.1 UTC

November 3, 1994 Solar Eclipse Parameters
Parameter	Value
Eclipse Magnitude	1.05351
Eclipse Obscuration	1.10989
Gamma	−0.35216
Sun Right Ascension	14h33m55.8s
Sun Declination	-15°05'51.1"
Sun Semi-Diameter	16'07.4"
Sun Equatorial Horizontal Parallax	08.9"
Moon Right Ascension	14h33m36.5s
Moon Declination	-15°26'53.7"
Moon Semi-Diameter	16'43.0"
Moon Equatorial Horizontal Parallax	1°01'21.1"
ΔT	60.6 s

== Eclipse season ==
This eclipse is part of an eclipse season, a period, roughly every six months, when eclipses occur. Only two (or occasionally three) eclipse seasons occur each year, and each season lasts about 35 days and repeats just short of six months (173 days) later; thus two full eclipse seasons always occur each year. Either two or three eclipses happen each eclipse season. In the sequence below, each eclipse is separated by a fortnight.

Eclipse season of November 1994
November 3 Ascending node (new moon)	November 18 Descending node (full moon)
Total solar eclipse Solar Saros 133	Penumbral lunar eclipse Lunar Saros 145

== Related eclipses ==
=== Eclipses in 1994 ===
- An annular solar eclipse on May 10.
- A partial lunar eclipse on May 25.
- A total solar eclipse on November 3.
- A penumbral lunar eclipse on November 18.

=== Metonic ===
- Preceded by: Solar eclipse of January 15, 1991
- Followed by: Solar eclipse of August 22, 1998

=== Tzolkinex ===
- Preceded by: Solar eclipse of September 23, 1987
- Followed by: Solar eclipse of December 14, 2001

=== Half-Saros ===
- Preceded by: Lunar eclipse of October 28, 1985
- Followed by: Lunar eclipse of November 9, 2003

=== Tritos ===
- Preceded by: Solar eclipse of December 4, 1983
- Followed by: Solar eclipse of October 3, 2005

=== Solar Saros 133 ===
- Preceded by: Solar eclipse of October 23, 1976
- Followed by: Solar eclipse of November 13, 2012

=== Inex ===
- Preceded by: Solar eclipse of November 23, 1965
- Followed by: Solar eclipse of October 14, 2023

=== Triad ===
- Preceded by: Solar eclipse of January 3, 1908
- Followed by: Solar eclipse of September 3, 2081

=== Solar eclipses of 1993–1996 ===
This eclipse is a member of a semester series. An eclipse in a semester series of solar eclipses repeats approximately every 177 days and 4 hours (a semester) at alternating nodes of the Moon's orbit.

Solar eclipse series sets from 1993 to 1996
Descending node			Ascending node		
Saros	Map	Gamma	Saros	Map	Gamma
118	May 21, 1993 Partial	1.1372	123	November 13, 1993 Partial	−1.0411
128 Partial in Bismarck, ND, USA	May 10, 1994 Annular	0.4077	133 Totality in Bolivia	November 3, 1994 Total	−0.3522
138	April 29, 1995 Annular	−0.3382	143 Totality in Dundlod, India	October 24, 1995 Total	0.3518
148	April 17, 1996 Partial	−1.058	153	October 12, 1996 Partial	1.1227

=== Saros 133 ===
This eclipse is a part of Saros series 133, repeating every 18 years, 11 days, and containing 72 events. The series started with a partial solar eclipse on July 13, 1219. It contains annular eclipses from November 20, 1435 through January 13, 1526; a hybrid eclipse on January 24, 1544; and total eclipses from February 3, 1562 through June 21, 2373. The series ends at member 72 as a partial eclipse on September 5, 2499. Its eclipses are tabulated in three columns; every third eclipse in the same column is one exeligmos apart, so they all cast shadows over approximately the same parts of the Earth.

The longest duration of annularity was produced by member 25 at 1 minutes, 14 seconds on November 30, 1453, and the longest duration of totality was produced by member 61 at 6 minutes, 50 seconds on August 7, 1850. All eclipses in this series occur at the Moon’s ascending node of orbit.

Series members 34–55 occur between 1801 and 2200:
34	35	36
July 17, 1814	July 27, 1832	August 7, 1850
37	38	39
August 18, 1868	August 29, 1886	September 9, 1904
40	41	42
September 21, 1922	October 1, 1940	October 12, 1958
43	44	45
October 23, 1976	November 3, 1994	November 13, 2012
46	47	48
November 25, 2030	December 5, 2048	December 17, 2066
49	50	51
December 27, 2084	January 8, 2103	January 19, 2121
52	53	54
January 30, 2139	February 9, 2157	February 21, 2175
55
March 3, 2193

=== Metonic series ===
The metonic series repeats eclipses every 19 years (6939.69 days), lasting about 5 cycles. Eclipses occur in nearly the same calendar date. In addition, the octon subseries repeats 1/5 of that or every 3.8 years (1387.94 days). All eclipses in this table occur at the Moon's ascending node.

20 eclipse events between June 10, 1964 and August 21, 2036
June 10–11	March 28–29	January 14–16	November 3	August 21–22
117	119	121	123	125
June 10, 1964	March 28, 1968	January 16, 1972	November 3, 1975	August 22, 1979
127	129	131	133	135
June 11, 1983	March 29, 1987	January 15, 1991	November 3, 1994	August 22, 1998
137	139	141	143	145
June 10, 2002	March 29, 2006	January 15, 2010	November 3, 2013	August 21, 2017
147	149	151	153	155
June 10, 2021	March 29, 2025	January 14, 2029	November 3, 2032	August 21, 2036

=== Tritos series ===
This eclipse is a part of a tritos cycle, repeating at alternating nodes every 135 synodic months (≈ 3986.63 days, or 11 years minus 1 month). Their appearance and longitude are irregular due to a lack of synchronization with the anomalistic month (period of perigee), but groupings of 3 tritos cycles (≈ 33 years minus 3 months) come close (≈ 434.044 anomalistic months), so eclipses are similar in these groupings.

Series members between 1801 and 2200
April 14, 1809 (Saros 116)	March 14, 1820 (Saros 117)	February 12, 1831 (Saros 118)	January 11, 1842 (Saros 119)	December 11, 1852 (Saros 120)
November 11, 1863 (Saros 121)	October 10, 1874 (Saros 122)	September 8, 1885 (Saros 123)	August 9, 1896 (Saros 124)	July 10, 1907 (Saros 125)
June 8, 1918 (Saros 126)	May 9, 1929 (Saros 127)	April 7, 1940 (Saros 128)	March 7, 1951 (Saros 129)	February 5, 1962 (Saros 130)
January 4, 1973 (Saros 131)	December 4, 1983 (Saros 132)	November 3, 1994 (Saros 133)	October 3, 2005 (Saros 134)	September 1, 2016 (Saros 135)
August 2, 2027 (Saros 136)	July 2, 2038 (Saros 137)	May 31, 2049 (Saros 138)	April 30, 2060 (Saros 139)	March 31, 2071 (Saros 140)
February 27, 2082 (Saros 141)	January 27, 2093 (Saros 142)	December 29, 2103 (Saros 143)	November 27, 2114 (Saros 144)	October 26, 2125 (Saros 145)
September 26, 2136 (Saros 146)	August 26, 2147 (Saros 147)	July 25, 2158 (Saros 148)	June 25, 2169 (Saros 149)	May 24, 2180 (Saros 150)
April 23, 2191 (Saros 151)

=== Inex series ===
This eclipse is a part of the long period inex cycle, repeating at alternating nodes, every 358 synodic months (≈ 10,571.95 days, or 29 years minus 20 days). Their appearance and longitude are irregular due to a lack of synchronization with the anomalistic month (period of perigee). However, groupings of 3 inex cycles (≈ 87 years minus 2 months) comes close (≈ 1,151.02 anomalistic months), so eclipses are similar in these groupings.

Series members between 1801 and 2200
March 4, 1821 (Saros 127)	February 12, 1850 (Saros 128)	January 22, 1879 (Saros 129)
January 3, 1908 (Saros 130)	December 13, 1936 (Saros 131)	November 23, 1965 (Saros 132)
November 3, 1994 (Saros 133)	October 14, 2023 (Saros 134)	September 22, 2052 (Saros 135)
September 3, 2081 (Saros 136)	August 15, 2110 (Saros 137)	July 25, 2139 (Saros 138)
July 5, 2168 (Saros 139)	June 15, 2197 (Saros 140)	
