= Long Beach (Nelson Island) =

Antarctic beach

Location of Nelson Island in the South Shetland Islands

Long Beach (Bulgarian: бряг Лонг, romanized: bryag Long, IPA: [ˈbrʲak ˈlɔŋ]) is the ice-free beach on the southwest coast of Nelson Island in the South Shetland Islands, Antarctica, extending 1 km northwards from Ross Point. Its surface area is 24.7 ha. The area was visited by early 19th century sealers.

The beach is named after the American missionary Albert Long (1832-1901) who contributed greatly to the Bulgarian National Revival, and together with Elias Riggs organized the first translation (by Neofit Rilski), printing and dissemination of the Bible in modern Bulgarian language; in association with other Bulgarian historical names in the area.

== Location ==
Long Beach is centred at 62°20′42.2″S 59°06′50″W, which is 3.39 km southeast of The Toe, 6.88 km west of Ivan Alexander Point and 3.54 km west-northwest of Vidaurre Point, the south extremity of the island. British mapping of the area in 1968.

== Maps ==
- Livingston Island to King George Island. Scale 1:200000. Admiralty Nautical Chart 1776. Taunton: UK Hydrographic Office, 1968
- South Shetland Islands. Scale 1:200000 topographic map No. 3373. DOS 610 - W 62 58. Tolworth, UK, 1968
- Antarctic Digital Database (ADD). Scale 1:250000 topographic map of Antarctica. Scientific Committee on Antarctic Research (SCAR). Since 1993, regularly upgraded and updated
