= Eclipse of the Sun (novel) =

1997 debut novel by Phil Whitaker

- First edition
- Author: Phil Whitaker
- Cover artist: Christopher Corr
- Language: English
- Publisher: Phoenix Books
- Publication date: 11 Aug 1997
- Publication place: United Kingdom
- Media type: Print
- Pages: 264
- ISBN: 1-86159-083-0

Eclipse of the Sun is the debut novel by English author Phil Whitaker. It won the John Llewellyn Rhys Prize in 1997, a Betty Trask Award in 1998, and was shortlisted for the 1997 Whitbread First Novel Award.

== Plot Introduction ==
Set in a small Indian town in 1995 where Rajesh Deshpande, an insecure, isolated science teacher is smitten by the new English tutor, but struggles to find a way to meet her. Then he learns about the forthcoming solar eclipse which appears to provide the ideal opportunity to impress her. Meanwhile, his faithful but superstitious wife Sumila determines to restore his love for her with the help of the Hindu gods and under the counsel of her overbearing mother.

== Reception ==
Mary Loudon writing in The Times states that despite never having been to India, the author "has managed with exquisite sensitivity to capture the feel and the tone of the country." Loudon does criticize the novels 'lack of pace and colour', explaining that "To set up a debate about science versus religion in contemporary India is a great idea, but the execution of it is a little slow and a little dry, and to my mind the novel is too long." But she concludes "Nevertheless, Whitaker is a thoughtful and imaginative writer, who bends to his subject and characters with rare humility and commitment. He is yet to find a confident authorial voice and a strong identifying style, but with time he may well do so".

James Simmons in The Spectator has no such reservations and calls the novel 'a little masterpiece', writing "Because of its familiar subject and the naiveté of the characters one might be inclined to put this book aside after the first chapter, but it is well worth persevering with because Whitaker is so genuinely inventive. The characters are always surprising you and contributing something subtle and interesting to the theme. Perhaps economy is the key to Whitaker's brilliance. Nothing is overdone."

Trevor Lewis in The Sunday Times is also positive, "It is a pleasant surprise to find an English writer who deftly evokes both the peculiar flavours of modern Indian life and the rhythms of subcontinental literature as a whole. Whitaker's novel plays off the themes of rationalism and spirituality, sculpting them into a leisurely comedy" and concludes "A generously humoured, genuinely humane account of infatuation and heartbreak".
