= Dorticum Cove =

Antarctic cove

Location of Nelson Island in the South Shetland Islands

Dorticum Cove (Bulgarian: залив Дортикум, romanized: zaliv Dorticum, IPA: [ˈzaliv ˈdɔrtikum]) is the 2.2 km wide cove indenting for 720 m the south coast of Nelson Island in the South Shetland Islands, Antarctica. It is entered west of Vidaurre Point, the south extremity of the island. The area was visited by early 19th century sealers.

The feature is named after the ancient Roman fortress of Dorticum in Northwestern Bulgaria, and in association with other Bulgarian historical names in the area.

== Location ==
Dorticum Cove is centred at 62°21′00″S 59°04′10″W, which is 2.75 km east of Ross Point. British mapping of the area in 1968.

== Maps ==
- Livingston Island to King George Island. Scale 1:200000. Admiralty Nautical Chart 1776. Taunton: UK Hydrographic Office, 1968
- South Shetland Islands. Scale 1:200000 topographic map No. 3373. DOS 610 - W 62 58. Tolworth, UK, 1968
- Antarctic Digital Database (ADD). Scale 1:250000 topographic map of Antarctica. Scientific Committee on Antarctic Research (SCAR). Since 1993, regularly upgraded and updated
