= Tuida Cove =

Location of Nelson Island in the South Shetland Islands.

Tuida Cove is a cove on the southeast coast of Nelson Island in the South Shetland Islands, Antarctica. It is 4.13 km (2.57 mi) wide, and indents 1.56 km (0.97 mi). It is entered east of Ivan Alexander Point and west of Slavotin Point. The cove's shape has been altered by glacial retreat in the late 20th and early 21st centuries.

== Name ==
The feature is named (Bulgarian: залив Туида, romanized: Zaliv Tuida) after the ancient and medieval fortress of Tuida in southeastern Bulgaria.

== Location ==
Tuida Cove is located at 62°19′40″S 58°57′05″W.

== Maps ==
- Antarctic Digital Database (ADD). Scale 1:250000 topographic map of Antarctica. Scientific Committee on Antarctic Research (SCAR). Since 1993, regularly upgraded and updated.
