= Vichina Cove =

Antarctic cove

Location of Nelson Island in the South Shetland Islands

Vichina Cove is a cove on the southeast coast of Nelson Island in the South Shetland Islands, Antarctica. It is 3 km (1.9 mi) wide and indents 1 km (0.6 mi). It is entered east of Slavotin Point and west of Burney Point. The area was visited by early 19th century sealers.

== Name ==
The feature is named (Bulgarian: залив Вичина, romanized: zaliv Vichina) after the fortified city of Vichina in medieval northeastern Bulgaria, and in association with other Bulgarian historical names in the area.

== Location ==
Vichina Cove is centred at 62°19′00″S 58°53′10″W. British mapping of the area in 1968.

== Maps ==
- Livingston Island to King George Island. Scale 1:200000. Admiralty Nautical Chart 1776. Taunton: UK Hydrographic Office, 1968
- South Shetland Islands. Scale 1:200000 topographic map No. 3373. DOS 610 - W 62 58. Tolworth, UK, 1968
- Antarctic Digital Database (ADD). Scale 1:250000 topographic map of Antarctica. Scientific Committee on Antarctic Research (SCAR). Since 1993, regularly upgraded and updated
