= Triangulation Beach =

Antarctic beach

Location of Nelson Island in the South Shetland Islands

Triangulation Beach (Bulgarian: бряг Триангулация, romanized: bryag Triangulatsiya, IPA: [ˈbrʲag triɐnguˈlat͡sijɐ]) is the ice-free 1.5 km long beach on the south coast of Nelson Island in the South Shetland Islands, Antarctica, extending both west and east of the south extremity of the island Vidaurre Point. Its surface area is 24.2 ha. The vicinity was visited by early 19th century sealers.

The feature is named after the triangulation method used in map making, in association with other names in the area deriving from the early development or use of geodetic instruments and methods.

== Location ==
Triangulation Beach is centred at 62°21′04″S 59°02′30″W, which is 4.17 km east by south of Ross Point and 3.25 km west-southwest of Ivan Alexander Point. British mapping of the area in 1968.

== Maps ==
- Livingston Island to King George Island. Scale 1:200000. Admiralty Nautical Chart 1776. Taunton: UK Hydrographic Office, 1968
- South Shetland Islands. Scale 1:200000 topographic map No. 3373. DOS 610 - W 62 58. Tolworth, UK, 1968
- Antarctic Digital Database (ADD). Scale 1:250000 topographic map of Antarctica. Scientific Committee on Antarctic Research (SCAR). Since 1993, regularly upgraded and updated
