= Ginkgo Creek =

Stream in Oregon, U.S.

Coordinates: 42°49′33″N 122°28′23″W

Ginkgo Creek is a stream in the U.S. state of Oregon. It is a tributary to Mill Creek.

Ginkgo Creek was named for the ginkgo trees lining its banks.
