= Triangulation (novel) =

1999 novel by Phil Whitaker

- First edition
- Author: Phil Whitaker
- Language: English
- Publisher: Picador
- Publication date: 1999
- Publication place: United Kingdom
- Pages: 272
- ISBN: 978-0-312-20599-7

Triangulation is the second novel by English author Phil Whitaker it won the 2000 Encore Award, linked to the title of a love triangle between three young people's lives.

== Plot ==
The frame story is set in 1997. After retirement from the Ordnance Survey, John Hopkins travels from his home in Southampton to Dunsop Bridge in Lancashire (thought to be the geographical centre of Britain) where his old flame Helen Gardner lives. The journey takes him over a day via train and then bus as he brings with him letters from his first job starting in 1957 working for the Directorate of Overseas Surveys at Tolworth in South West London. His colleague Laurance Wallace joined at the same time but was shortly sent out to Africa to help survey the landscape using theodolites and later tellurometers. John remained as a map curator in the Records Section and later the assistant of Brigadier Martin Hotine, where he found great satisfaction in his work.

Two years later Helen Gardner joins the organisation as a trainee cartographer and starts a low-level affair with John, but Helen wants more excitement in her life. Laurance's letters to John show the reality of his experiences in Africa so John shows Helen the letters from Laurance to tell her that life in Africa is a struggle. Helen finds that Laurance's stories capture her imagination; using a stereoplotter she finds one of the locations frequented by Laurance. Every summer, Laurance returns to live with John but then the relationship between Helen and John becomes strained as Helen and Laurance's relationship blossoms. In the end Helen travels to Africa to be with Laurance where they marry.

== Reception ==
- The Guardian website praises the novel: "Naive and hesitant, young John gets involved in a romantic triangulation that has nothing to do with maps. It's hard to believe that this is only Whitaker's second novel; he is in complete control here, drawing sparks from the friction between his characters - dry John, restless Helen, adventurous Laurance. There are echoes of The Remains of the Day in John's repression, but Whitaker adds a dash of suspense to keep Triangulation spicy".
- Publishers Weekly also praises the novel: "Whitaker's meticulous prose is shot through with a veneration for gallant heroism and even a touch of nostalgia for the questionable glories of imperialism. Though the narrator's extreme reserve threatens to squelch the passion and torment the author so carefully fosters, the narrative moves gracefully toward its tragic end."
- New Statesman reviewer Candida Clark, explains that the circumstances that drew the characters together are "shown to be as shadowy and deceptive as their relationships once were to one another: all three worked for the directorate of overseas surveys, an obsolete organisation that sometimes produced false maps in an attempt to benefit from forgotten skirmishes in dark corners of the empire. And as John travels closer to the geographical heart of England in search of lost time, there is the sense of his past—and all notions of empire—dissolving."
- The Guardian critic Alex Clark observed, "these are characters unaware of the larger political context in which they are operating. Whitaker weaves a complex tale of personal and professional treachery, in which the fallible narrator's culpability for the disastrous events that befall Helen and Laurance slowly unfolds."
