= Grace Rock =

Rock in Antarctica

- Location of Nelson Island in the South Shetland Islands

- Location within Antarctic Peninsula Location within Antarctica

Geography
- Location: Antarctica
- Coordinates: 62°21′32.3″S 58°59′22.5″W

Administration
- Administered under the Antarctic Treaty System

Demographics
- Population: Uninhabited

Grace Rock is a rock in Bransfield Strait, Antarctica, lying 1.72 kilometres (0.93 nmi) off the southeast coast of Nelson Island in the South Shetland Islands. It was named by the UK Antarctic Place-Names Committee in 1961 after the British sealing vessel Grace (Captain H. Rowe) from Plymouth, which visited the South Shetland Islands in 1821–22.

== Map ==
- South Shetland Islands. Scale 1:200000 topographic map No. 3373. DOS 610 - W 62 58. Tolworth, UK, 1968.
