= Phil Whitaker =

British novelist, physician and medical commentator (born 1966)

- Born: 1966 (age 59–60); Kent, England
- Education: University of Nottingham; University of East Anglia
- Occupations: Novelist, physician, medical commentator
- Writing career
- Language: English
- Notable awards: John Llewellyn Rhys Prize (1997); Betty Trask Award (1998); Encore Award (2000)
- Website: philwhitaker.co.uk

Phil Whitaker (born 1966) is an English novelist, physician, and medical commentator.

== Education and writings ==
Whitaker, born in Kent, qualified in medicine at the University of Nottingham in 1990. He undertook postgraduate training in general practice in Oxford. He also completed an MA in creative writing at the University of East Anglia in 1996.

Whitaker made his debut with the novel Eclipse of the Sun, which received the 1997 John Llewellyn Rhys Prize and the 1998 Betty Trask Award, and was shortlisted for the 1997 Whitbread First Novel Award. His second novel, Triangulation, won the 2000 Encore Award.

Whitaker writes a regular medical column, and periodic essays, for the UK current affairs weekly New Statesman. He has published influential pieces in the British Medical Journal on the role of the GP and on the future of doctor-patient communication. He currently lives in Wiltshire.

In 2024, Whitaker was awarded Fellowship of the Royal College of General Practitioners in recognition of his medical writing, in particular the part he has played in creating understanding about the role of the general medical practitioner among politicians, policy-makers and the general public.

== Awards ==
- 1997: John Llewellyn Rhys Prize, Eclipse of the Sun
- 1998: Betty Trask Award, Eclipse of the Sun
- 2000: Encore Award, Triangulation
- 2024: Fellowship of the Royal College of General Practitioners (FRCGP)

== Bibliography ==
- Eclipse of the Sun (1997)
- Triangulation (1999)
- The Face (2002)
- Freak of Nature (2007)
- Sister Sebastian's Library (2016)
- You (2018)
- Chicken Unga Fever (2018)
- What Is a Doctor? (2023)
