= Bononia Cove =

Cove in the South Shetland Islands, Antarctica

Location of Nelson Island in the South Shetland Islands

Bononia Cove is a cove on the southeast coast of Nelson Island in the South Shetland Islands, Antarctica. It is 3.1 km (1.9 mi) wide and indents 1.1 km (0.7 mi). It is entered west of Ivan Alexander Point. The cove's shape has been altered by glacial retreat in the late 20th and early 21st centuries.

== Name ==
The feature is named (Bulgarian: залив Бонония, romanized: Zaliv Bononia) after the ancient Roman town of Bononia in northwestern Bulgaria.

== Location ==
Bononia Cove is located at 62°20′40″S 59°00′40″W.

== Maps ==
- Antarctic Digital Database (ADD). Scale 1:250000 topographic map of Antarctica. Scientific Committee on Antarctic Research (SCAR). Since 1993, regularly upgraded and updated.
