= Ivan Alexander Point =

Location of Nelson Island in the South Shetland Islands

Ivan Alexander Point is a low rocky point on the southeast coast of Nelson Island in the South Shetland Islands, Antarctica forming the east side of the entrance to Bononia Cove and the west side of the entrance to Tuida Cove.

== Name ==
The point is named (Bulgarian: нос Иван Александър, romanized: Nos Ivan Aleksandar) after Czar Ivan Alexander of Bulgaria, 1331–1371.

== Location ==
Ivan Alexander Point is located at 62°20′38.6″S 58°58′51″W, and is:

- 3.7 km (2.3 mi) east-northeast of Vidaurre Point
- 7.34 km (4.56 mi) east of Ross Point
- 8.64 km (5.37 mi) west-southwest of Duthoit Point
- 4.17 km (2.59 mi) west-southwest of Slavotin Point
- 1.73 km (1.07 mi) north-northeast of Grace Rock.

British mapping in 1968.

== Maps ==
- South Shetland Islands. Scale 1:200000 topographic map No. 3373. DOS 610 - W 62 58. Tolworth, UK, 1968.
- Antarctic Digital Database (ADD). Scale 1:250000 topographic map of Antarctica. Scientific Committee on Antarctic Research (SCAR), 1993–2016.
