= Vidaurre Point =

Antarctic headland

Location of Nelson Island in the South Shetland Islands

Vidaurre Point is the ice-free south extremity of Nelson Island in the South Shetland Islands, Antarctica, also the west entrance point of Bononia Cove and east entrance point of Dorticum Cove on the south coast of the island. The area was visited by early 19th century sealers and the feature was named by Chile.

== Location ==
Vidaurre Point is located at 62°21′15″S 59°02′55″W, which is 3.86 km east by south of Ross Point and 3.7 km west-southwest of Ivan Alexander Point. Chilean mapping in 1951 and British mapping in 1968.

== Maps ==
- Livingston Island to King George Island. Scale 1:200000. Admiralty Nautical Chart 1776. Taunton: UK Hydrographic Office, 1968
- South Shetland Islands. Scale 1:200000 topographic map No. 3373. DOS 610 - W 62 58. Tolworth, UK, 1968
- Antarctic Digital Database (ADD). Scale 1:250000 topographic map of Antarctica. Scientific Committee on Antarctic Research (SCAR). Since 1993, regularly upgraded and updated
