= Orbel Peak =

Mountain in Antarctica

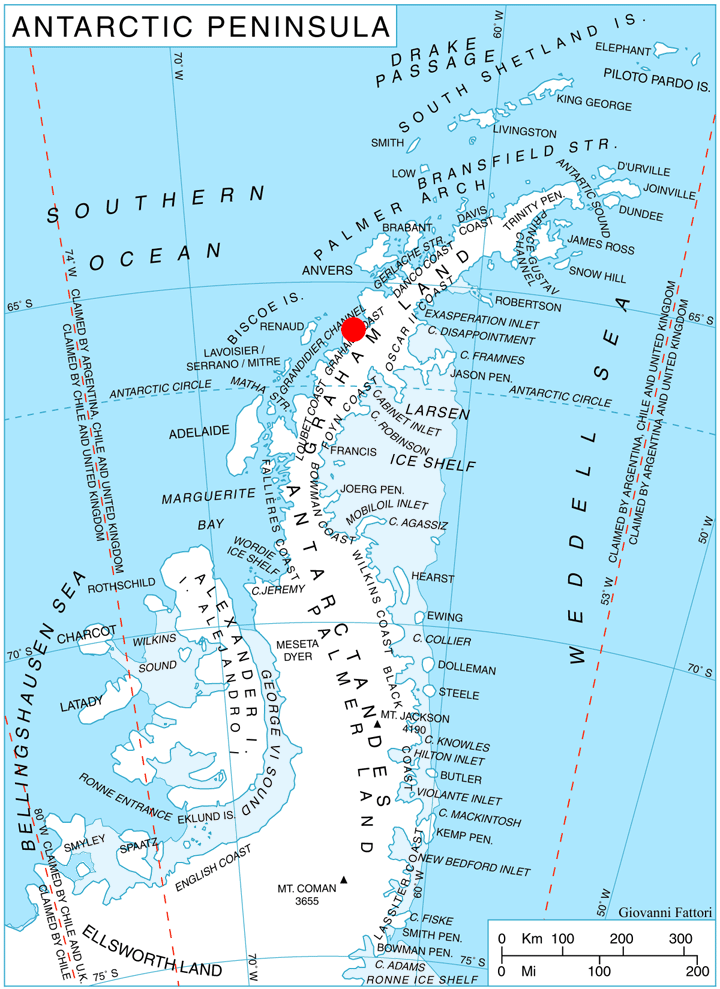
Location of Magnier Peninsula on Graham Coast, Antarctic Peninsula.

Orbel Peak (Bulgarian: връх Орбел, romanized: vrah Orbel, IPA: [ˈvrɤx ˈɔrbɛɫ]) is the rocky peak of elevation 784 m forming the north extremity of Lisiya Ridge on Magnier Peninsula, Graham Coast in Graham Land, Antarctica. It has steep and partly ice-free southeast and west slopes, and surmounts Muldava Glacier to the southwest and Leroux Bay to the north. Orbel is the ancient Thracian name of a group of mountains in Southwestern Bulgaria.

== Location ==
Orbel Peak is located at 65°41′50″S 64°08′54″W, which is 9.4 km southeast of Paragon Point, 10.8 km southwest of Mount Radotina, 11.9 km west-northwest of Mount Chevreux and 5.1 km north of Mount Perchot. British mapping in 1971.

== Maps ==
- Antarctic Digital Database (ADD). Scale 1:250000 topographic map of Antarctica. Scientific Committee on Antarctic Research (SCAR). Since 1993, regularly upgraded and updated.
- British Antarctic Territory. Scale 1:200000 topographic map. DOS 610 Series, Sheet W 65 64. Directorate of Overseas Surveys, Tolworth, UK, 1971.
