= Mount Radotina =

Mountain in Graham Land, Antarctica

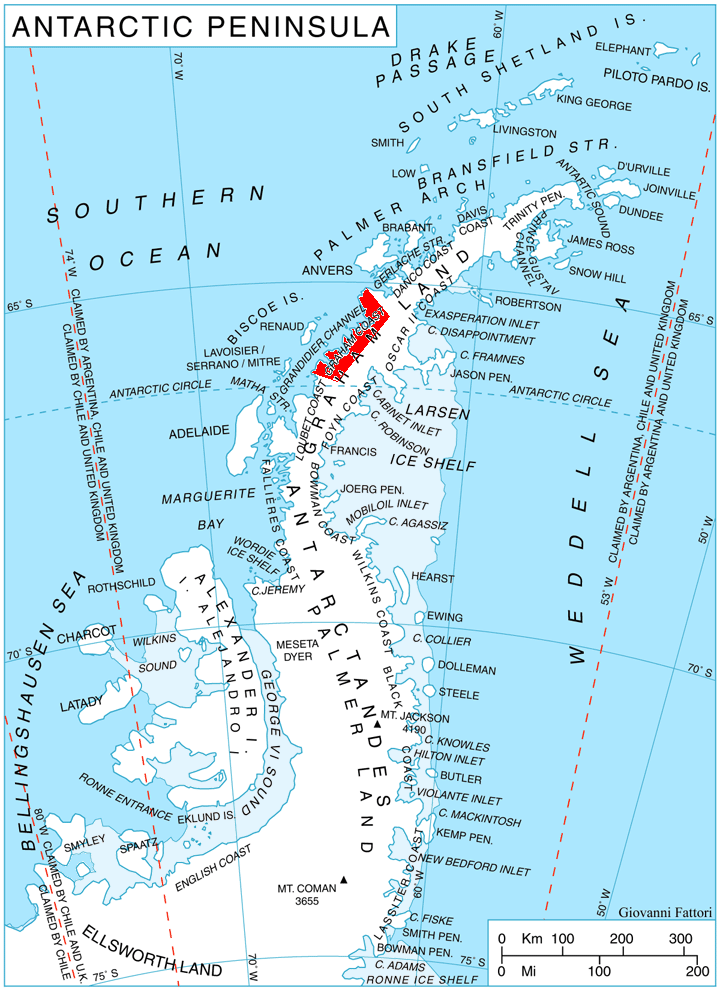
Location of Graham Coast on the Antarctic Peninsula.

Mount Radotina (Bulgarian: връх Радотина, romanized: vrah Radotina, IPA: [ˈvrɤx ˈradotinɐ]) is the rounded ice-covered peak rising to 1754 m in the west foothills of Bruce Plateau on Graham Coast in Graham Land, Antarctica. It is situated at the base of Barison Peninsula. The feature has steep, rocky and partly ice-free northeast and southwest slopes, and surmounts Chernomen Glacier to the northwest, Talev Glacier to the north, Cadman Glacier to the east-northeast and Luke Glacier to the southwest.

The mountain is named after the settlement of Radotina in Western Bulgaria.

== Location ==
Mount Radotina is located at 65°39′52″S 63°55′37″W, which is 12 km southeast of Eijkman Point, 11.9 km southwest of Mount Rouge and 7.55 km north of Mount Chevreux. British mapping in 1976.

== Maps ==
- Antarctic Digital Database (ADD). Scale 1:250000 topographic map of Antarctica. Scientific Committee on Antarctic Research (SCAR). Since 1993, regularly upgraded and updated.
- British Antarctic Territory. Scale 1:200000 topographic map. DOS 610 Series, Sheet W 65 62. Directorate of Overseas Surveys, Tolworth, UK, 1976.
