= Macrobius Cove =

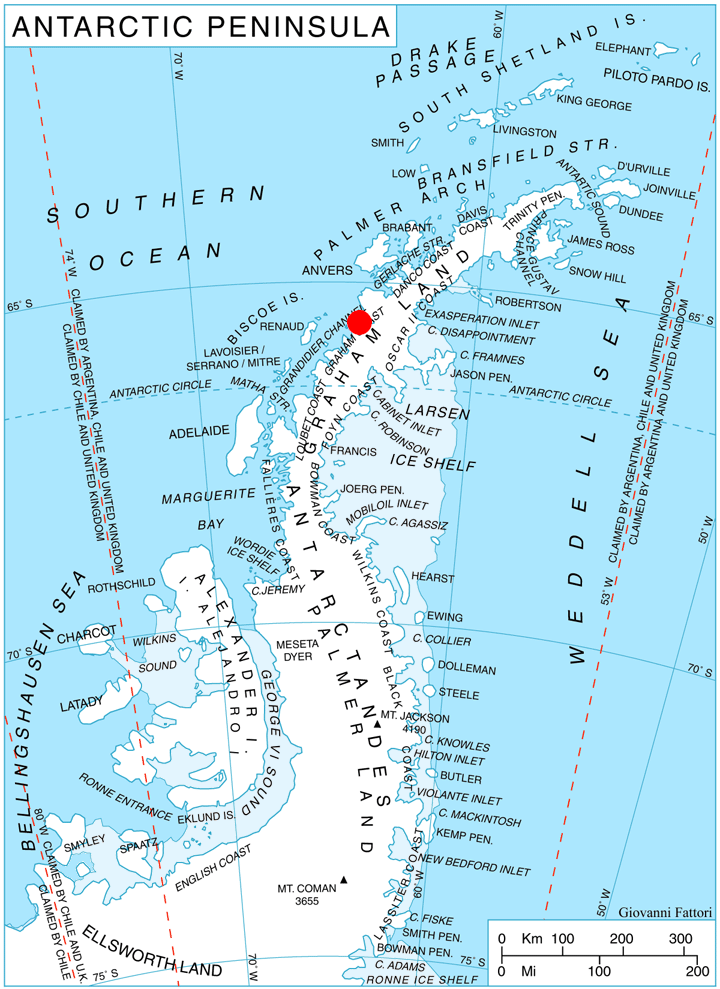
Location of Barison Peninsula on Graham Coast, Antarctic Peninsula.

Macrobius Cove (Bulgarian: залив Макробий, ‘Zaliv Macrobius’ \'za-liv ma-'kro-biy\) is the 2.8 km wide cove indenting for 3.4 km the west coast of Barison Peninsula, Graham Coast on the Antarctic Peninsula northeast of Eijkman Point and east of Bablon Island. It is part of Leroux Bay. The head of the cove is fed by Chernomen Glacier.

The feature is named after the Roman writer and philosopher Ambrosius Macrobius (4th-5th century) who placed on the world map the southern polar land envisaged by Aristotle.

== Location ==
Macrobius Cove is centred at 65°37′05″S 64°07′10″W. British mapping in 1971.

== Maps ==
- British Antarctic Territory. Scale 1:200000 topographic map. DOS 610 Series, Sheet W 65 64. Directorate of Overseas Surveys, Tolworth, UK, 1971.
- Antarctic Digital Database (ADD). Scale 1:250000 topographic map of Antarctica. Scientific Committee on Antarctic Research (SCAR). Since 1993, regularly upgraded and updated.
