= Finaeus Cove =

Inlet on the Graham coast of the Antarctic Peninsula

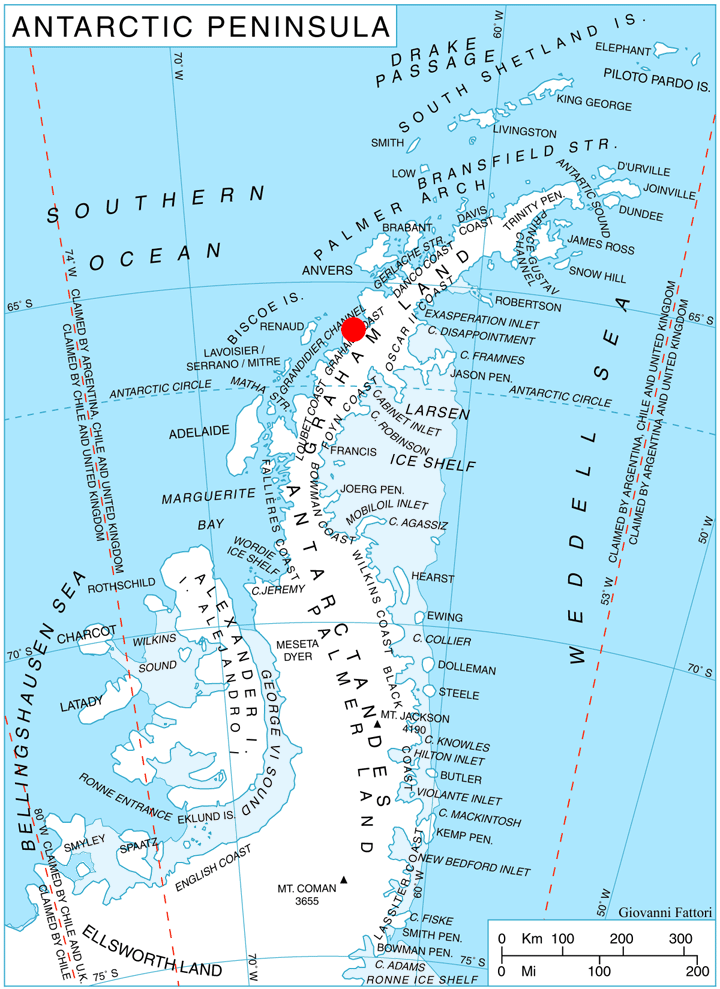
Location of Magnier Peninsula on Graham Coast, Antarctic Peninsula.

Finaeus Cove (Bulgarian: залив Финей, ‘Zaliv Finaeus’ \'za-liv fi-'ney\) is the 3.8 km wide cove indenting for 2.8 km the northeast coast of Magnier Peninsula, Graham Coast on the Antarctic Peninsula. It is part of Leroux Bay, entered southeast of Vartop Point and northwest of Krasava Point. The head of the cove is fed by Muldava Glacier.

The feature was named by Bulgaria after the French cartographer Orontius Finaeus (Oronce Finé, 1494-1555) whose 1531 world map features a vast southern continent named Terra Australis.

== Location ==
Finaeus Cove is centred at 65°40′50″S 64°11′40″W, according to British mapping in 1971.

== Maps ==
- British Antarctic Territory. Scale 1:200000 topographic map. DOS 610 Series, Sheet W 65 64. Directorate of Overseas Surveys, Tolworth, UK, 1971.
- Antarctic Digital Database (ADD). Scale 1:250000 topographic map of Antarctica. Scientific Committee on Antarctic Research (SCAR). Since 1993, regularly upgraded and updated.
