= Chargan Ridge =

Region in Antarctica

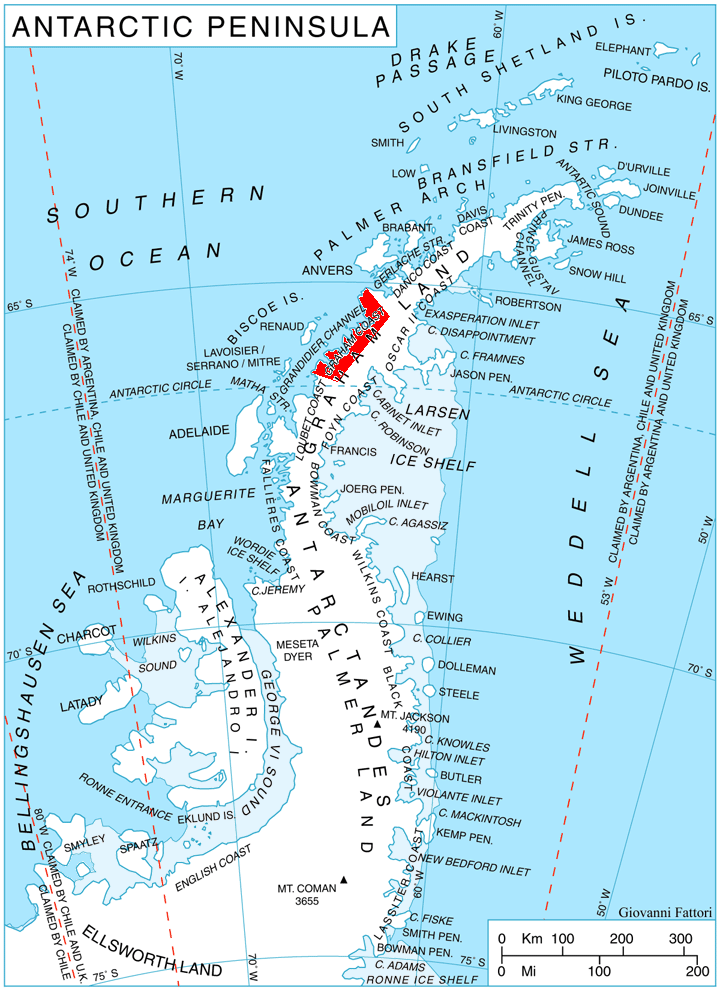
Location of Graham Coast on the Antarctic Peninsula.

Chargan Ridge (Bulgarian: рид Чарган, ‘Rid Chargan’ \'rid char-'gan\ is the mostly ice-covered ridge extending 9.5 km in southeast–northwest direction, 5.4 km wide and rising to 2149 m in the west foothills of Bruce Plateau on Graham Coast in Graham Land, Antarctica. It has steep and partly ice-free northwest and northeast slopes, and surmounts Pollard Glacier to the northeast, Comrie Glacier to the north, and Bradford Glacier to the west and southwest.

The ridge is named after the settlement of Chargan in Southeastern Bulgaria.

== Location ==
Chargan Ridge is located at 65°51′41″S 64°08′52″W, which is 8.9 km northeast of Mount Dewey, 10.7 km south-southeast of Mount Bigo, 5.9 km southwest of Kenderova Buttress, and 31.2 km northwest of Kyulevcha Nunatak on Oscar II Coast. British mapping in 1971.

== Maps ==
- British Antarctic Territory. Scale 1:200000 topographic map. DOS 610 Series, Sheet W 65 64. Directorate of Overseas Surveys, Tolworth, UK, 1971.
- Antarctic Digital Database (ADD). Scale 1:250000 topographic map of Antarctica. Scientific Committee on Antarctic Research (SCAR). Since 1993, regularly upgraded and updated.
