= Nesla Glacier =

Glacier in Antarctica

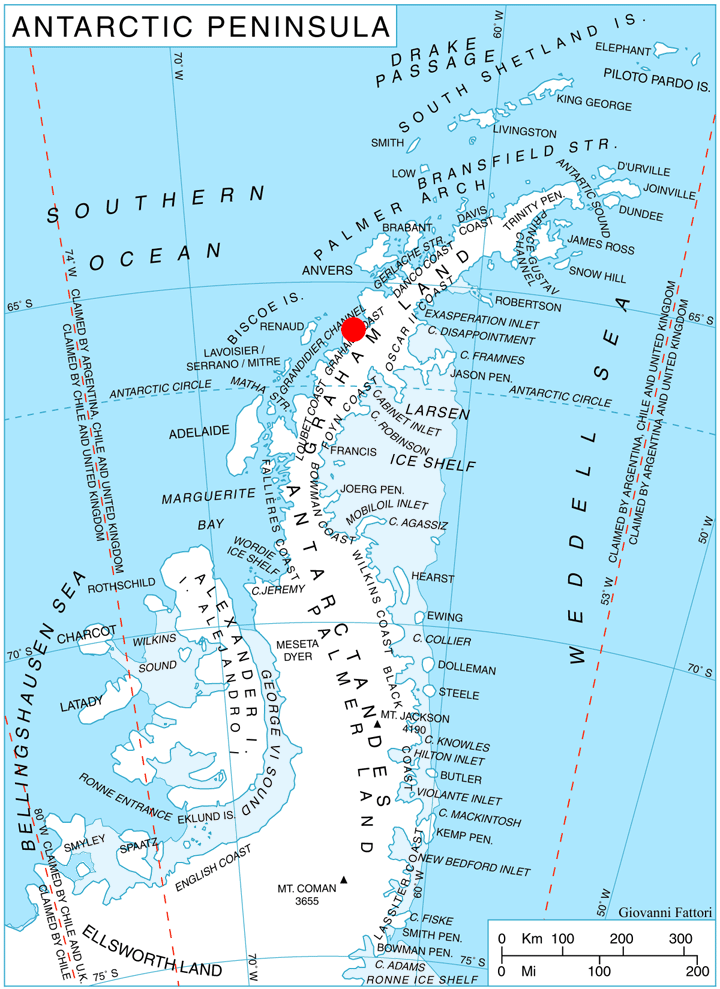
Location of Magnier Peninsula on Graham Coast, Antarctic Peninsula.

Nesla Glacier (Bulgarian: ледник Несла, romanized: lednik Nesla, IPA: [ˈlɛdnik ˈnɛsɫɐ]) is the 6.2 km (3.2 mi) long and 2 km (1.2 mi) wide glacier on Magnier Peninsula, Graham Coast on the west side of Antarctic Peninsula, situated southwest of Muldava Glacier and north of Kolosh Glacier. It drains the west slopes of Lisiya Ridge west of Mount Perchot, and flows westwards into Bigo Bay next north of the terminus of Kolosh Glacier.

The glacier is named after the settlement of Nesla in Western Bulgaria.

== Location ==
Nesla Glacier is centred at 65°43′25″S 64°16′30″W. British mapping in 1971.

== Maps ==
- British Antarctic Territory. Scale 1:200000 topographic map. DOS 610 Series, Sheet W 65 64. Directorate of Overseas Surveys, Tolworth, UK, 1971.
- Antarctic Digital Database (ADD). Scale 1:250000 topographic map of Antarctica. Scientific Committee on Antarctic Research (SCAR), 1993–2016.
