= Kolosh Glacier =

Glacier in Antarctica

- Bulgarian: ледник Колош
- Interactive map of Kolosh Glacier
- Location: Magnier Peninsula, Graham Coast
- Coordinates: 65°44′50″S 64°18′30″W
- Length: 6.7 km
- Width: 3.6 km

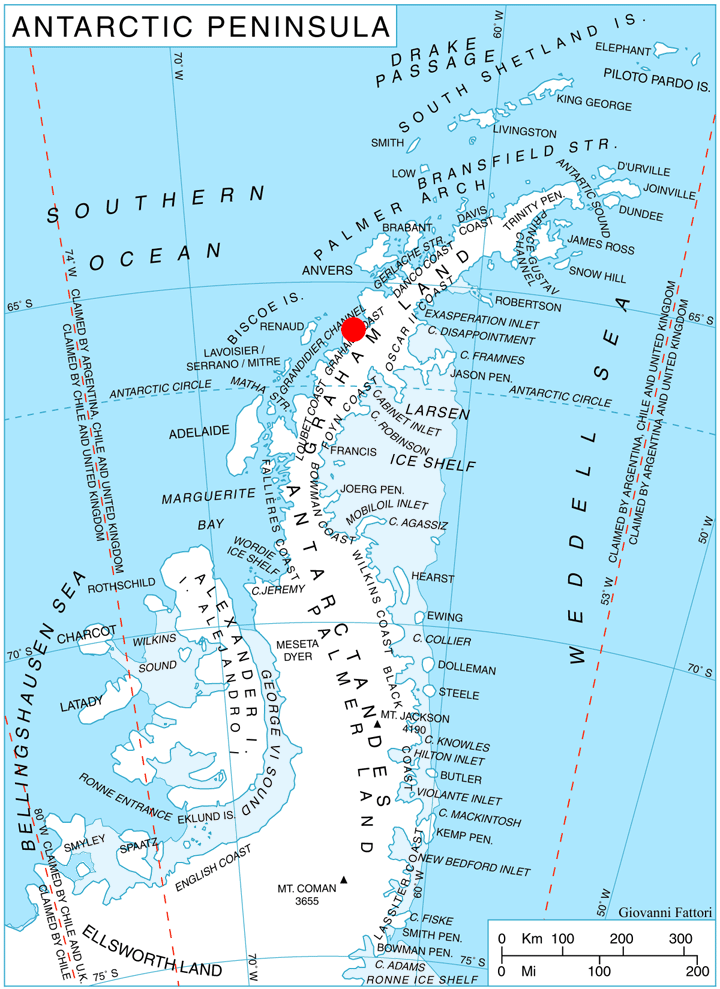
Location of Magnier Peninsula on Graham Coast, Antarctic Peninsula.

Kolosh Glacier (Bulgarian: ледник Колош, romanized: lednik Kolosh, IPA: [ˈlɛdnik ˈkɔɫoʃ]) is a 6.7 km long and 3.6 km wide glacier on Magnier Peninsula, Graham Coast on the west side of Antarctic Peninsula, situated south of Nesla Glacier. It drains the west slopes of Lisiya Ridge north of Mount Bigo, and flows northwestwards into Bigo Bay next south of the terminus of Nesla Glacier.

The glacier is named after Kolosh Peak in Konyavska Mountain, Western Bulgaria.

== Location ==
Kolosh Glacier is centred at 65°44′50″S 64°18′30″W. British mapping in 1971.

== Maps ==
- British Antarctic Territory. Scale 1:200000 topographic map. DOS 610 Series, Sheet W 65 64. Directorate of Overseas Surveys, Tolworth, UK, 1971.
- Antarctic Digital Database (ADD). Scale 1:250000 topographic map of Antarctica. Scientific Committee on Antarctic Research (SCAR), 1993–2016.
