= Krasava Point =

Geographic location

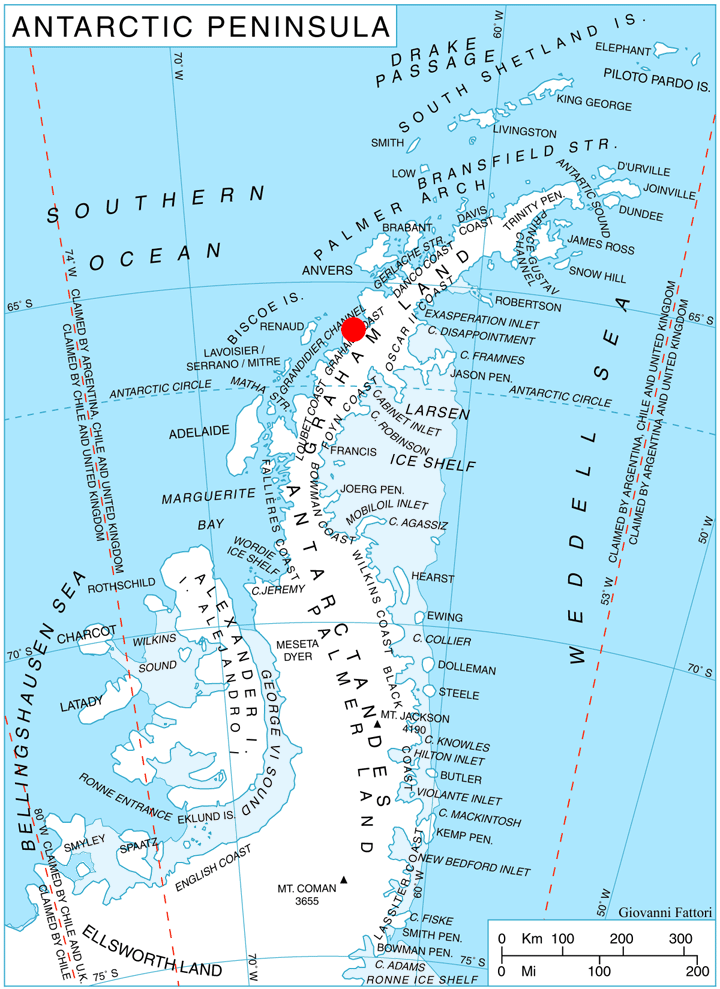
Location of Magnier Peninsula on Graham Coast, Antarctic Peninsula.

Krasava Point (Bulgarian: нос Красава, ‘Nos Krasava’ \'nos kra-'sa-va\) is the point on the southeast side of the entrance to Finaeus Cove on the northeast coast of Magnier Peninsula, Graham Coast on the Antarctic Peninsula. It is formed by an offshoot of Orbel Peak.

The feature is named after the settlement of Krasava in Western Bulgaria.

== Location ==
Krasava Point is located at 65°40′41″S 64°09′23″W, which is 3.8 km southeast of Vartop Point and 7 km south of Eijkman Point. British mapping in 1971.

== Maps ==
- British Antarctic Territory. Scale 1:200000 topographic map. DOS 610 Series, Sheet W 65 64. Directorate of Overseas Surveys, Tolworth, UK, 1971.
- Antarctic Digital Database (ADD). Scale 1:250000 topographic map of Antarctica. Scientific Committee on Antarctic Research (SCAR), 1993–2016.
