= Chorul Peninsula =

Peninsula in Antarctica

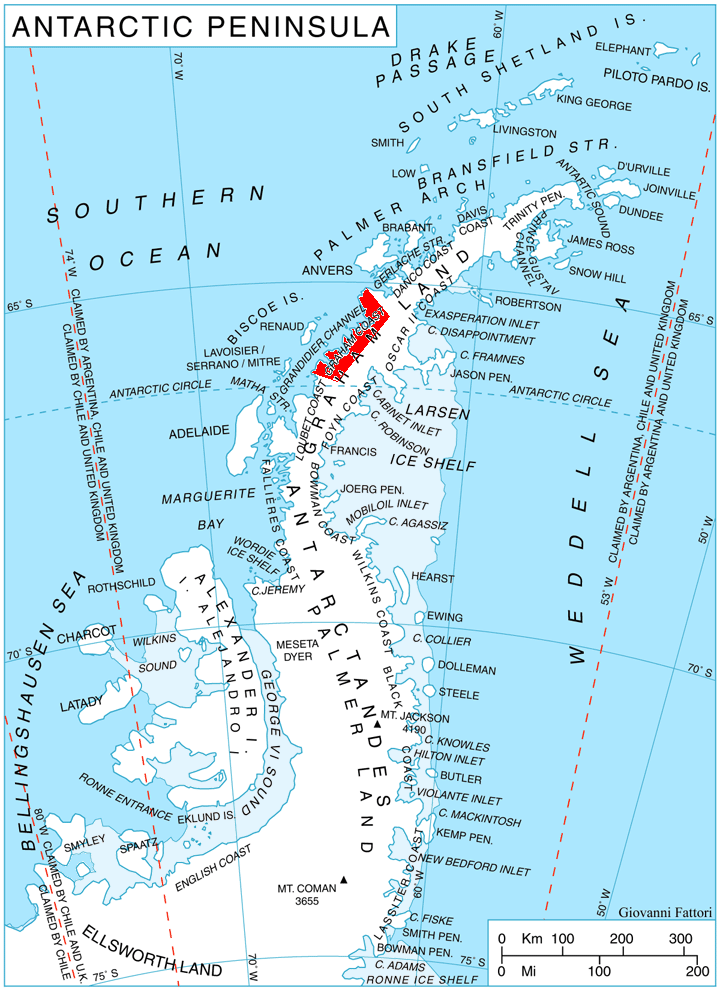
Location of Graham Coast on the Antarctic Peninsula.

Chorul Peninsula (Bulgarian: полуостров Чорул, romanized: poluostrov Chorul, IPA: [poɫuˈɔstrof ˈt͡ʃɔroɫ]) is the predominantly ice-covered 5.6 km wide peninsula projecting from Graham Coast, Antarctic Peninsula 5.6 km westwards into Beascochea Bay, and ending in Holst Point. Its shape was enhanced as a result of the adjacent Funk Glacier retreating during the last decade of 20th century and the first decade of 21st century.

The feature is named after the settlement of Chorul in Western Bulgaria.

== Location ==
Chorul Peninsula is centred at 65°33′00″S 63°45′10″W. British mapping in 1976.

== Maps ==
- British Antarctic Territory. Scale 1:200000 topographic map. DOS 610 Series, Sheet W 65 62. Directorate of Overseas Surveys, Tolworth, UK, 1976.
- Antarctic Digital Database (ADD). Scale 1:250000 topographic map of Antarctica. Scientific Committee on Antarctic Research (SCAR). Since 1993, regularly upgraded and updated.
