= Vartop Point =

Geographic location

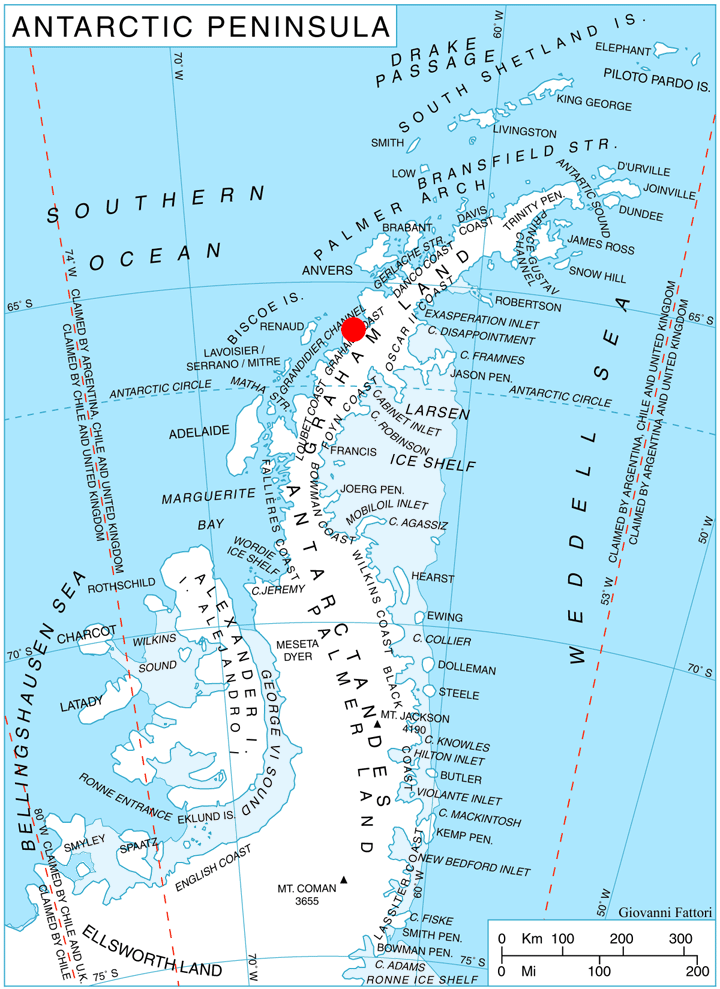
Location of Magnier Peninsula on Graham Coast, Antarctic Peninsula.

Vartop Point (Bulgarian: нос Въртоп, ‘Nos Vartop’ \'nos v&r-'top\) is the point on the northwest side of the entrance to Finaeus Cove on the northeast coast of Magnier Peninsula, Graham Coast on the Antarctic Peninsula.

The feature is named after the settlement of Vartop in Northwestern Bulgaria.

== Location ==
Vartop Point is located at 65°39′18″S 64°13′00″W, which is 3.85 km southeast of Paragon Point, 5.18 km southwest of Eijkman Point and 3.8 km northwest of Krasava Point. British mapping in 1971.

== Maps ==
- British Antarctic Territory. Scale 1:200000 topographic map. DOS 610 Series, Sheet W 65 64. Directorate of Overseas Surveys, Tolworth, UK, 1971.
- Antarctic Digital Database (ADD). Scale 1:250000 topographic map of Antarctica. Scientific Committee on Antarctic Research (SCAR), 1993–2016.
