= Komuniga Island =

Island in Graham Land, Antarctica

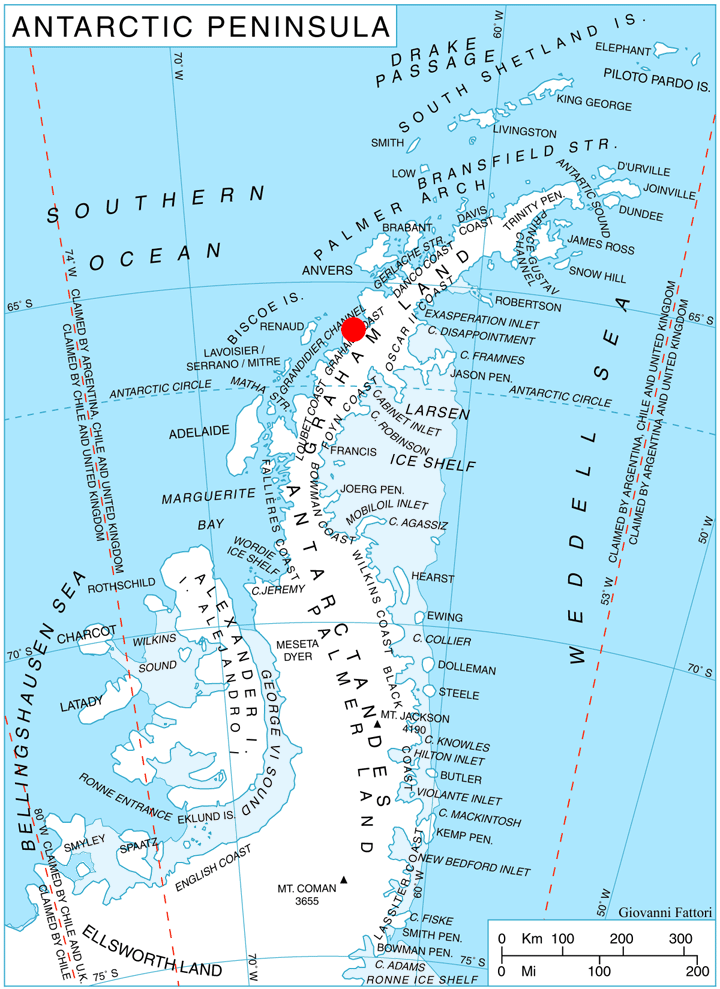
- Location of Magnier Peninsula on Graham Coast, Antarctic Peninsula

- Location within Antarctica

Geography
- Location: Antarctica
- Coordinates: 65°43′27″S 64°23′37″W

Administration
- Administered under the Antarctic Treaty System

Demographics
- Population: Uninhabited

Komuniga Island (Bulgarian: остров Комунига, romanized: ostrov Komuniga, IPA: [ˈɔstrof komoˈniɡɐ]) is an ice-covered island extending 1.3 km in southeast-northwest direction and 1.1 km wide, the southernmost in the Correo group in Bigo Bay on Graham Coast in Graham Land, Antarctica, off the southwest coast of Magnier Peninsula. It emerged as a distinct geographical entity following the retreat of Magnier Peninsula's ice cap in the first decade of the 21st century.

The island is named after the settlement of Komuniga in Southern Bulgaria.

== Location ==
Komuniga Island is located 1.3 km northwest of the nearest mainland point and 500 m southeast of Baurene Island. British mapping in 1971.

== Maps ==
- Antarctic Digital Database (ADD). Scale 1:250000 topographic map of Antarctica. Scientific Committee on Antarctic Research (SCAR). Since 1993, regularly upgraded and updated.
- British Antarctic Territory. Scale 1:200000 topographic map. DOS 610 Series, Sheet W 65 64. Directorate of Overseas Surveys, Tolworth, UK, 1971.
