= Bablon Island =

Island in Graham Land, Antarctica

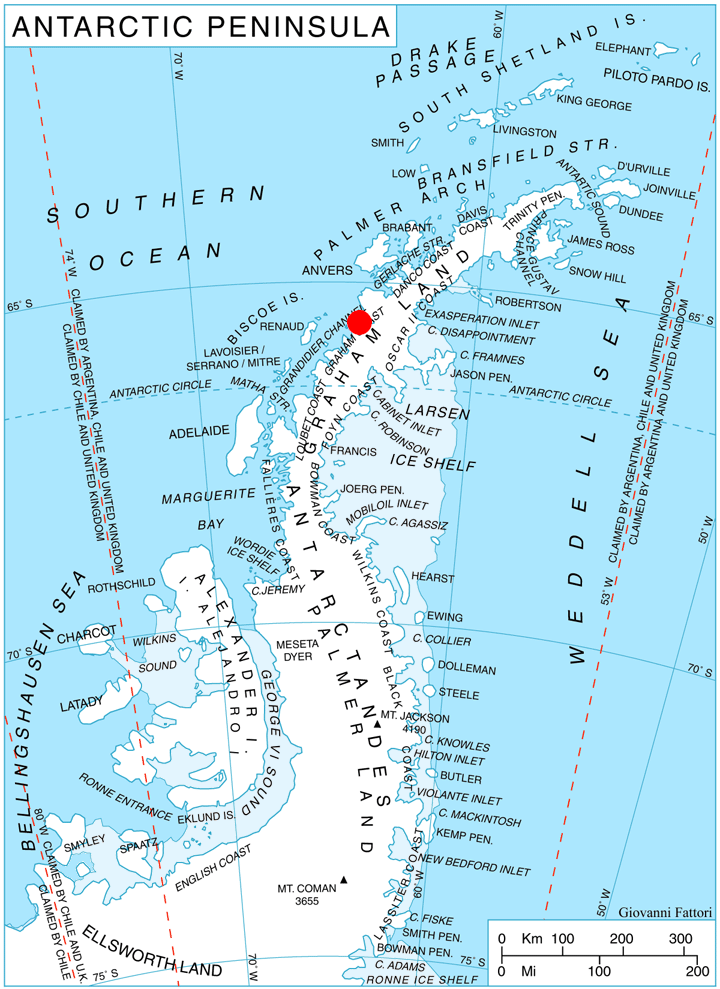
- Location of Barison Peninsula on Graham Coast, Antarctic Peninsula

- Location within Antarctica

Geography
- Location: Antarctica
- Coordinates: 65°36′36″S 64°09′32″W

Administration
- Administered under the Antarctic Treaty System

Demographics
- Population: Uninhabited

Bablon Island (Bulgarian: остров Баблон, romanized: ostrov Bablon, IPA: [ˈɔstrov bɐˈbɫɔn]) is the ice-free island off the west coast of Barison Peninsula, Graham Coast on the Antarctic Peninsula extending 1.15 km in southeast–northwest direction and 400 m wide. It is lying on the west side of Macrobius Cove and separated from Eijkman Point to the south by a 220 m wide passage.

The feature is named after the settlement of Bablon in Southern Bulgaria.

== Location ==
Bablon Island is located at 65°36′36″S 64°09′32″W. British mapping in 1971.

== Maps ==
- British Antarctic Territory. Scale 1:200000 topographic map. DOS 610 Series, Sheet W 65 64. Directorate of Overseas Surveys, Tolworth, UK, 1971.
- Antarctic Digital Database (ADD). Scale 1:250000 topographic map of Antarctica. Scientific Committee on Antarctic Research (SCAR). Since 1993, regularly upgraded and updated.
