= Kenderova Buttress =

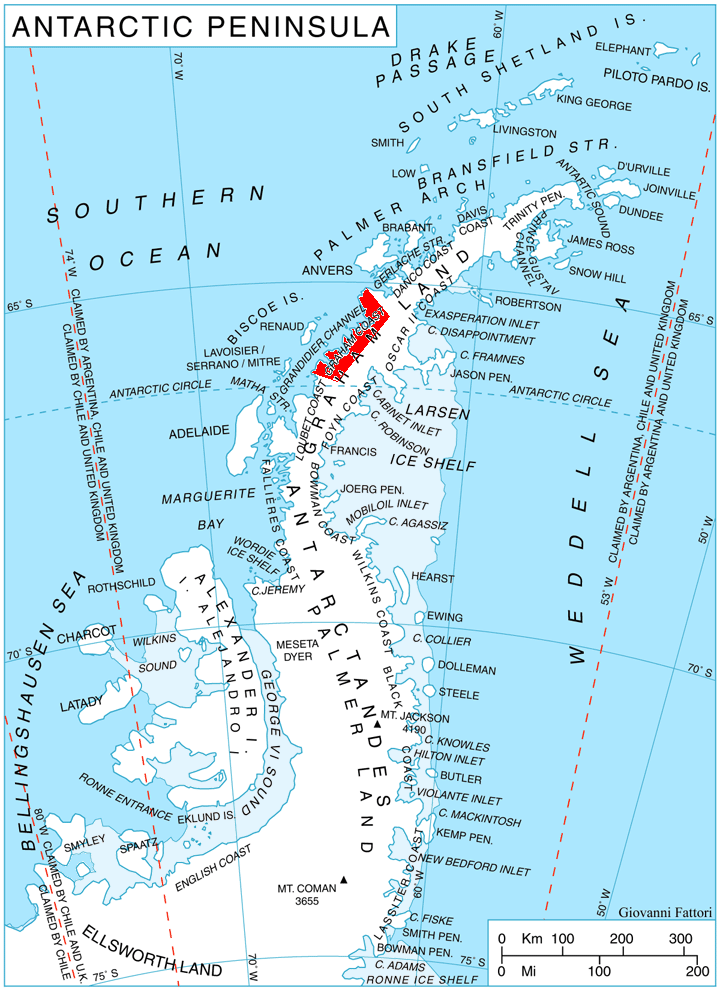
Location of Graham Coast on the Antarctic Peninsula.

Kenderova Buttress (Bulgarian: рид Кендерова, ‘Rid Kenderova’ \'rid ken-'de-ro-va\ is the ice-covered ridge rising to 2101 m in the west foothills of Bruce Plateau on Graham Coast in Graham Land, Antarctica. It has steep and partly ice-free southwest and northwest slopes, and surmounts Comrie Glacier to the northeast and northwest and its tributary Pollard Glacier to the southwest.

The buttress is named after Rositsa Kenderova, geomorphologist at St. Kliment Ohridski base in 2004/05 and subsequent seasons.

== Location ==
Kenderova Buttress is located at 65°49′44″S 64°02′45″W, which is 14.8 km northeast of Mount Dewey, 11.45 km southeast of Mount Bigo, 12.66 km southwest of Mount Chevreux, and 28.64 km northwest of Kyulevcha Nunatak on Oscar II Coast. British mapping in 1971.

== Maps ==
- British Antarctic Territory. Scale 1:200000 topographic map. DOS 610 Series, Sheet W 65 64. Directorate of Overseas Surveys, Tolworth, UK, 1971.
- Antarctic Digital Database (ADD). Scale 1:250000 topographic map of Antarctica. Scientific Committee on Antarctic Research (SCAR). Since 1993, regularly upgraded and updated.
