= Baurene Island =

Island in Graham Land, Antarctica

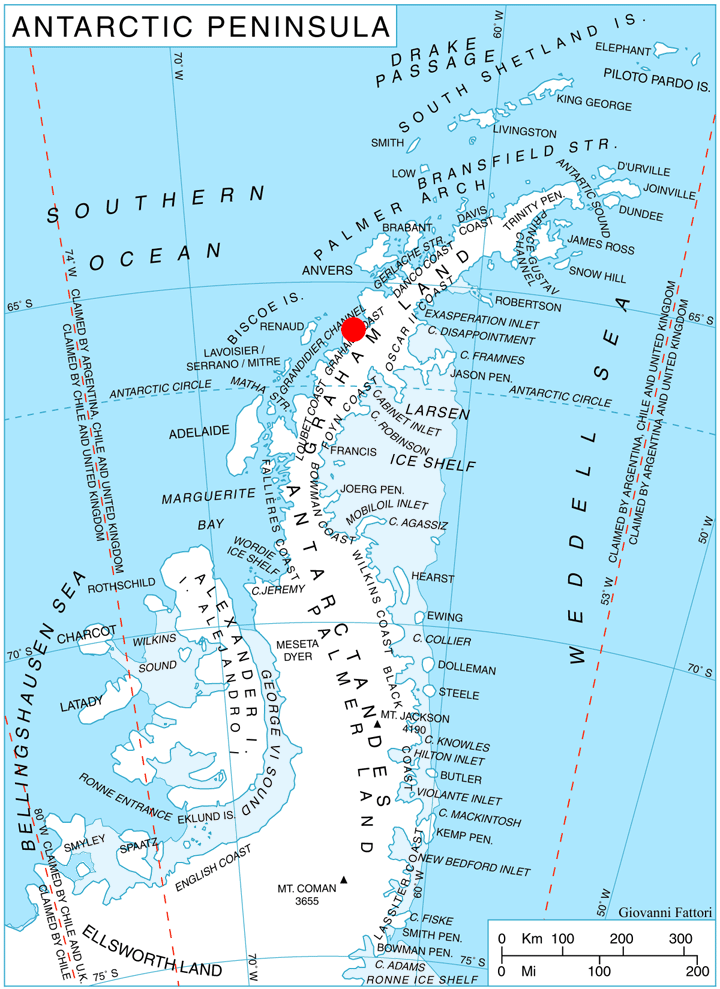
- Location of Magnier Peninsula on Graham Coast, Antarctic Peninsula

- Location within Antarctica

Geography
- Location: Antarctica
- Coordinates: 65°42′38″S 64°25′00″W

Administration
- Administered under the Antarctic Treaty System

Demographics
- Population: Uninhabited

Baurene Island (Bulgarian: остров Баурене, romanized: ostrov Baurene, IPA: [ˈɔstrov ˈbaorɛnɛ]) is an ice-covered island extending 1.24 km in southeast–northwest direction and 350 m wide, the middle of the three islands of the Correo group in Bigo Bay on Graham Coast in Graham Land, Antarctica, off the southwest coast of Magnier Peninsula. It emerged as a distinct geographical entity following the retreat of Magnier Peninsula's ice cap in the second half of the 20th century.

The island is named after the settlement of Baurene in Northwestern Bulgaria.

== Location ==
Baurene Island is located at 65°42′38″S 64°25′00″W, which is 500 m northwest of Komuniga Island and 450 m southeast of Lizard Island. British mapping in 1971.

== Maps ==
- Antarctic Digital Database (ADD). Scale 1:250000 topographic map of Antarctica. Scientific Committee on Antarctic Research (SCAR). Since 1993, regularly upgraded and updated.
- British Antarctic Territory. Scale 1:200000 topographic map. DOS 610 Series, Sheet W 65 64. Directorate of Overseas Surveys, Tolworth, UK, 1971.
