= Plas Point =

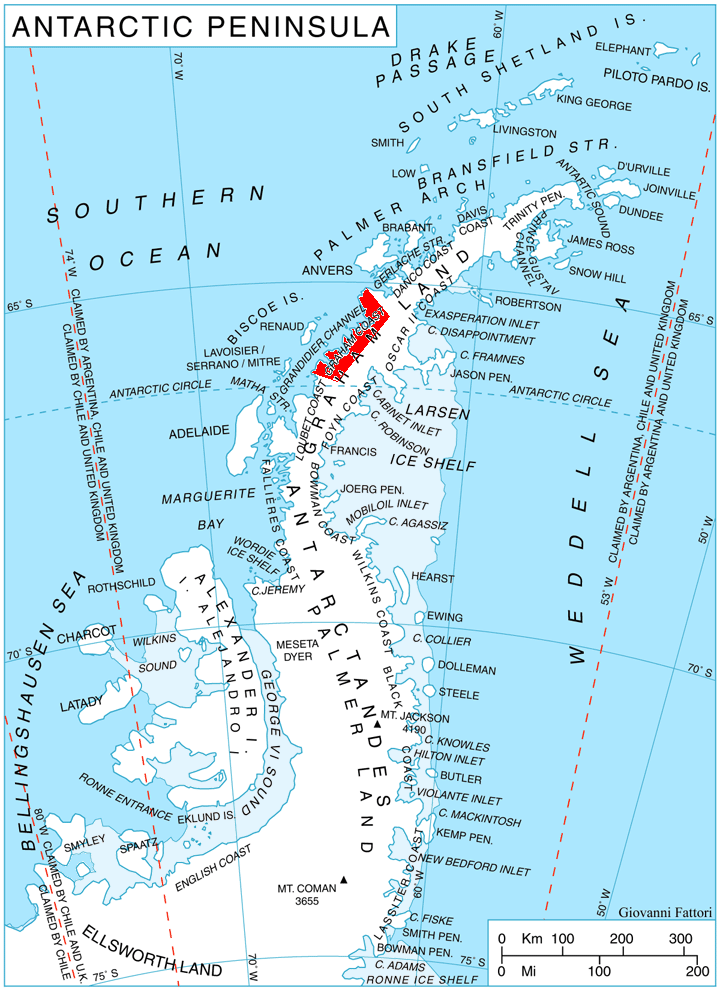
Location of Graham Coast on the Antarctic Peninsula.

Plas Point (Bulgarian: нос Плас, ‘Nos Plas’ \'nos 'plas\) is the point on the south side of the entrance to Nevsha Cove, Graham Coast on the Antarctic Peninsula. Its shape was enhanced as a result of the adjacent Funk Glacier and Cadman Glacier retreating during the last decade of 20th century and the first decade of 21st century.

The feature is named after Plas Peak in Pirin Mountain, Bulgaria.

== Location ==
Plas Point is located at 65°35′34″S 63°47′28″W, which is 11.65 km southeast of Chiloé Point and 6.15 km south-southeast of Holst Point.

== Maps ==
- Antarctic Digital Database (ADD). Scale 1:250000 topographic map of Antarctica. Scientific Committee on Antarctic Research (SCAR). Since 1993, regularly upgraded and updated.
