= Muldava Glacier =

Glacier in Antarctica

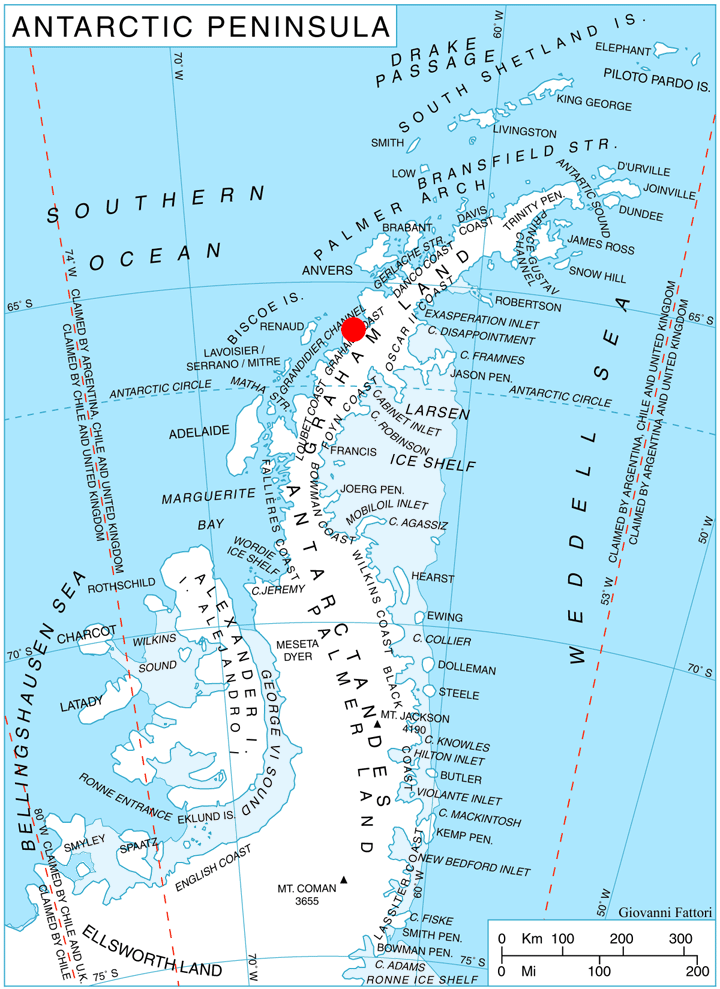
Location of Magnier Peninsula on Graham Coast, Antarctic Peninsula.

Muldava Glacier (Bulgarian: ледник Мулдава, romanized: lednik Muldava, IPA: [ˈlɛdnik moɫˈdavɐ]) is the 4.4 km long and 3.2 km wide glacier on Magnier Peninsula, Graham Coast on the west side of Antarctic Peninsula, situated west of Luke Glacier and northeast of Nesla Glacier. It drains the northwest slopes of Lisiya Ridge north of Mount Perchot, and flows northwards into Leroux Bay.

The glacier is named after the settlement of Muldava in Southern Bulgaria.

== Location ==
Muldava Glacier is centred at 65°42′10″S 64°12′10″W. from British mapping done in 1971.

== Maps ==
- British Antarctic Territory. Scale 1:200000 topographic map. DOS 610 Series, Sheet W 65 64. Directorate of Overseas Surveys, Tolworth, UK, 1971.
- Antarctic Digital Database (ADD). Scale 1:250000 topographic map of Antarctica. Scientific Committee on Antarctic Research (SCAR), 1993–2016.
