= Butamya Glacier =

Glacier in Antarctica

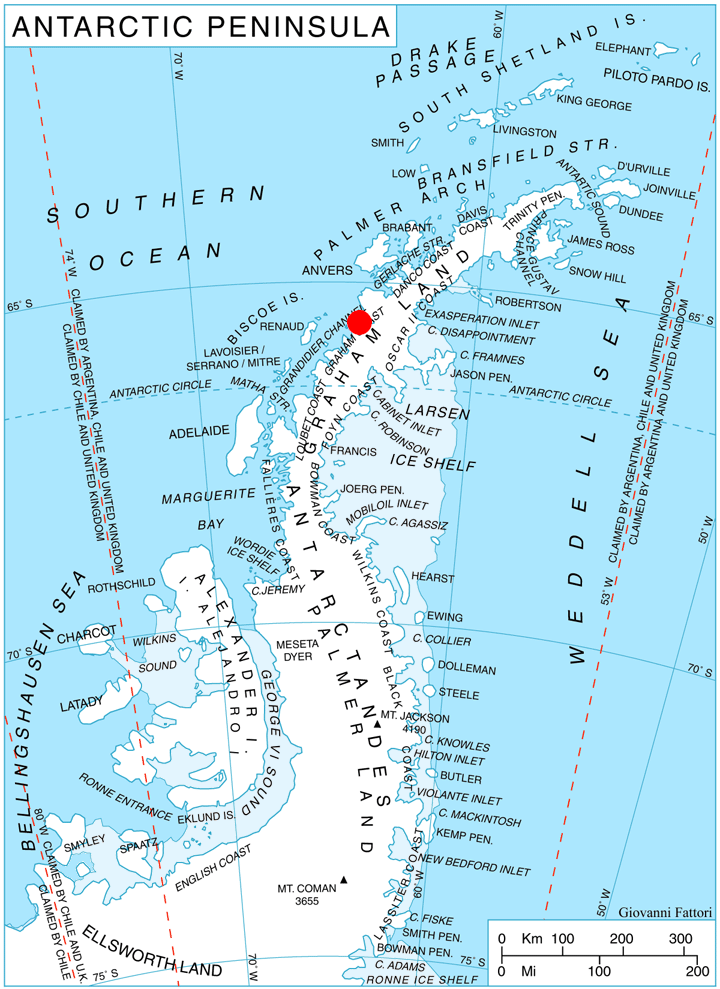
- Location of Barison Peninsula on Graham Coast, Antarctic Peninsula

- Location within Antarctica
- Location: Ellsworth Land
- Coordinates: 65°36′S 64°00′W
- Length: 6.9 km (4.3 mi)
- Width: 2.5 km (1.6 mi)
- Thickness: unknown
- Terminus: Beascochea Bay
- Status: unknown

Butamya Glacier (Bulgarian: ледник Бутамя, romanized: lednik Butamya, IPA: [ˈlɛdniɡ botɐˈmʲa]) is the 6.9 km long and 2.5 km wide glacier on Barison Peninsula, Graham Coast on the west side of Antarctic Peninsula, situated northwest of Talev Glacier and north-northeast of Chernomen Glacier. It drains northwards, and flows into Beascochea Bay.

The glacier is named after the seaside locality of Butamya in Southeastern Bulgaria.

== Location ==
Butamya Glacier is centred at 65°36′00″S 64°00′00″W. British mapping in 1971 and 1976.

== See also ==
- List of glaciers in the Antarctic
- Glaciology

== Maps ==
- British Antarctic Territory. Scale 1:200000 topographic map. DOS 610 Series, Sheet W 65 64. Directorate of Overseas Surveys, Tolworth, UK, 1971.
- British Antarctic Territory. Scale 1:200000 topographic map. DOS 610 Series, Sheet W 65 62. Directorate of Overseas Surveys, Tolworth, UK, 1976.
- Antarctic Digital Database (ADD). Scale 1:250000 topographic map of Antarctica. Scientific Committee on Antarctic Research (SCAR), 1993–2016.
