= Chernomen Glacier =

Glacier in Antarctica

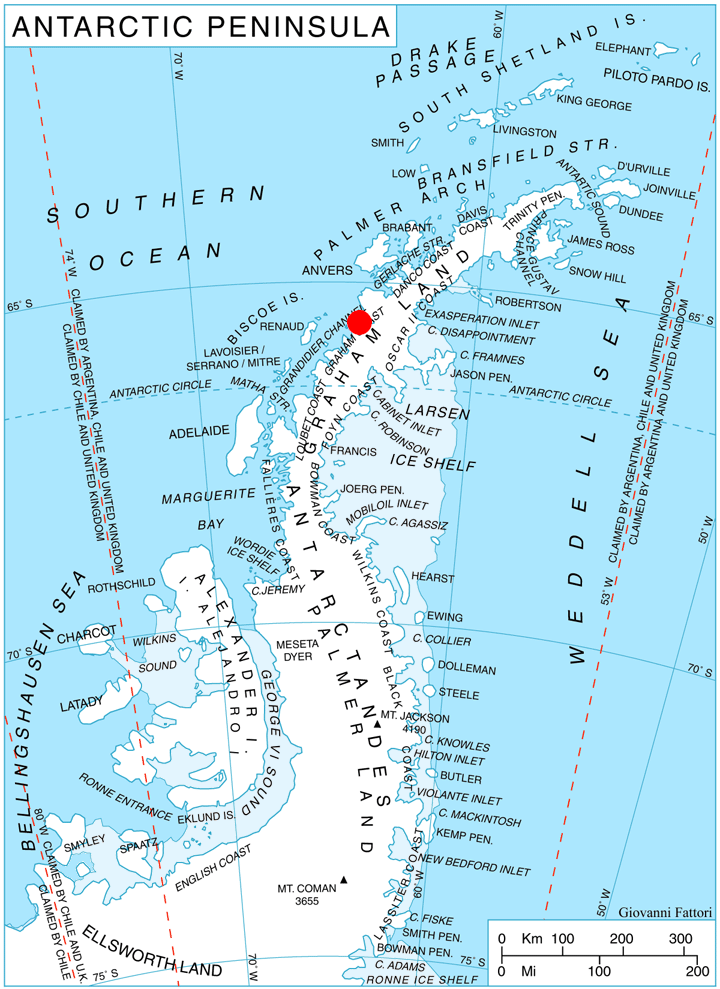
- Location of Barison Peninsula on Graham Coast, Antarctic Peninsula

- Location within Antarctica
- Location: Graham Land
- Coordinates: 65°38′30″S 64°02′50″W
- Length: 3 nmi (6 km; 3 mi)
- Width: 1.2 nmi (2 km; 1 mi)
- Thickness: unknown
- Terminus: Leroux Bay
- Status: unknown

Chernomen Glacier (Bulgarian: ледник Черномен, romanized: lednik Chernomen, IPA: [ˈlɛdnik t͡ʃɛrnoˈmɛn]) is the 3 nmi (6 km; 3 mi) long and 1.2 nmi (2 km; 1 mi) wide glacier on Barison Peninsula, Graham Coast on the west side of Antarctic Peninsula, situated south-southwest of Butamya Glacier and west-southwest of Talev Glacier. It drains northwestwards, and flows into Leroux Bay southeast of Eijkman Point.

The glacier is named after the settlement of Chernomen in medieval Southern Bulgaria.

== Location ==
Chernomen Glacier is centred at 65°38′30″S 64°02′50″W. British mapping in 1971.

== See also ==
- List of glaciers in the Antarctic
- Glaciology

== Maps ==
- British Antarctic Territory. Scale 1:200000 topographic map. DOS 610 Series, Sheet W 65 64. Directorate of Overseas Surveys, Tolworth, UK, 1971.
- Antarctic Digital Database (ADD). Scale 1:250000 topographic map of Antarctica. Scientific Committee on Antarctic Research (SCAR). Since 1993, regularly upgraded and updated.
