= Sanctuary Islands =

Group of islands in Antarctica

Sanctuary Islands (65°37′S 64°35′W) is a group of small islands lying just off the west side of Chavez Island, 0.5 nautical miles (0.9 km) southwest of Link Stack, off the west coast of Graham Land. Charted by the British Graham Land Expedition (BGLE) under Rymill, 1934–37. So named by the United Kingdom Antarctic Place-Names Committee (UK-APC) in 1959 because these islands provided sheltered camping sites for Falkland Islands Dependencies Survey (FIDS) sledging parties from the Prospect Point station in 1957, and there are several small boat anchorages which were used by the British Naval Hydrographic Survey Unit's motor-launch in 1957–58.

== See also ==
- List of Antarctic and sub-Antarctic islands
