= Lisiya Ridge =

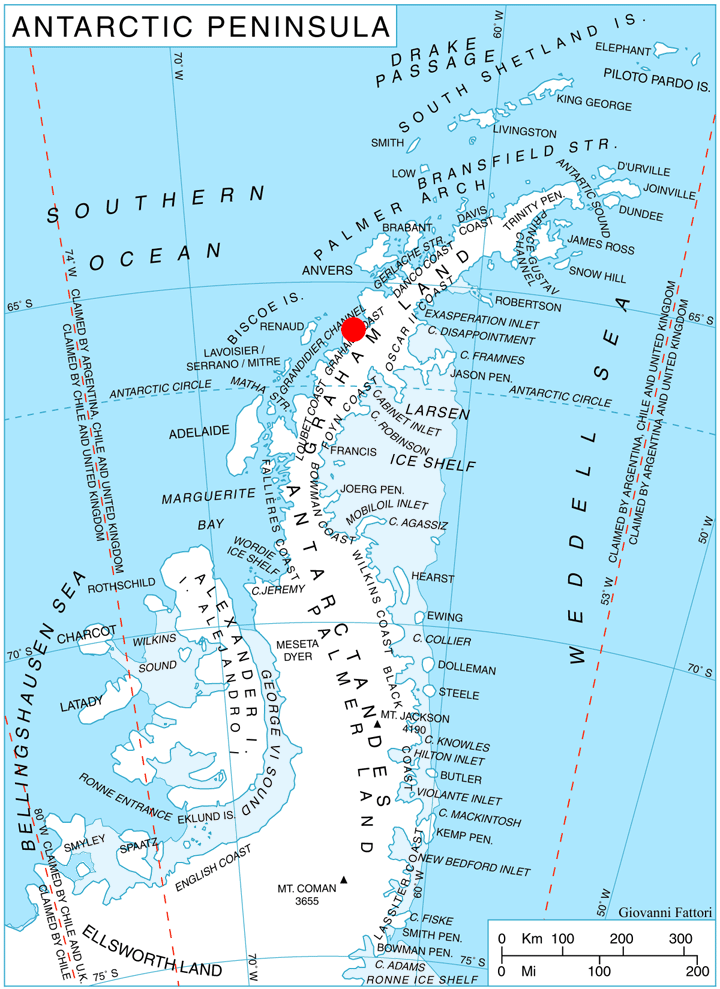
Location of Magnier Peninsula on Graham Coast, Antarctic Peninsula.

Lisiya Ridge (Bulgarian: Лисийски хребет, ‘Lisiyski Hrebet’ \li-'siy-ski 'hre-bet\) is the ice-covered ridge rising to over 2100 m at the base of Magnier Peninsula, Graham Coast on the west side of Antarctic Peninsula, extending 16 km in northeast-southwest direction between the heads of Leroux Bay and Bigo Bay, and 11 km wide. Bounded by Comrie Glacier to the south and a tributary to Luke Glacier to the east. Featuring Mount Bigo at its southwest extremity and Mount Perchot in its central part. Precipitous, partly ice-free northwest slopes drained by the glaciers Muldava, Nesla and Kolosh.

The ridge is named after the settlement of Lisiya in Southwestern Bulgaria.

== Location ==
Lisiya Ridge is centred at 65°45′10″S 64°11′00″W. British mapping in 1971.

== Maps ==
- British Antarctic Territory. Scale 1:200000 topographic map. DOS 610 Series, Sheet W 65 64. Directorate of Overseas Surveys, Tolworth, UK, 1971.
- Antarctic Digital Database (ADD). Scale 1:250000 topographic map of Antarctica. Scientific Committee on Antarctic Research (SCAR), 1993–2016.
