= Takaki =

Takaki (written: 高木 or 髙木) is a Japanese surname. Notable people with the surname include:

- Jumpei Takaki (高木 純平, born 1982), Japanese footballer
- Masato Takaki (高木 正人, born 1966), Japanese sailor
- Narita Takaki (髙木 成太, born 1977), Japanese footballer
- Takaki Kanehiro (高木 兼寛, 1849–1920), Japanese physician
- Rie Takaki (高木 理江, born 1983), Japanese volleyball player
- Ronald Takaki (1939–2009), American historian
- Yoshiaki Takaki (高木 義明, born 1945), Japanese politician
- Yuya Takaki (高木 雄也, born 1990), Japanese Idol

Takaki (written: 貴葵 or 貴樹) is also a masculine Japanese given name. Notable people with the name include:

- Takaki Shigemitsu (重光 貴葵) (born 1983), Japanese footballer

== See also ==
- Takagi, another Japanese surname written with the same kanji
- Takaki Bakery, a bakery in Hiroshima, Japan
- Takaki Promontory, a promontory in Antarctica
- Takaaki, a masculine Japanese given name
