= Frölich Peak =

Antarctic mountain

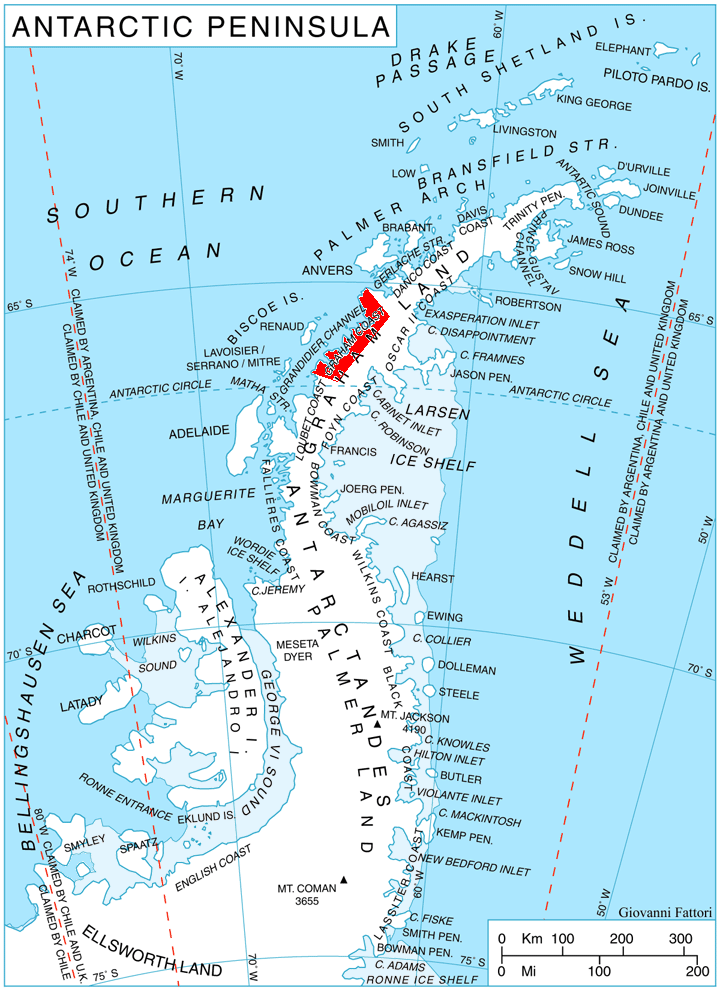
Location of Graham Coast on the Antarctic Peninsula.

Frölich Peak (65°32′S 63°48′W) is a peak 1,035 metres (3,400 ft) high, rising above Holst Point and dominating tree at the head of Beascochea Bay on the west coast of Graham Land, Antarctica.

The peak was charted by the French Antarctic Expedition, 1908–10, under Jean-Baptiste Charcot, and was named by the UK Antarctic Place-Names Committee in 1959 for Theodor C.B. Frölich, a Norwegian biochemist who in 1907, with Axel Holst, first produced experimental scurvy and laid the foundations for later work on vitamins.
