= Talev Glacier =

Glacier in Antarctica

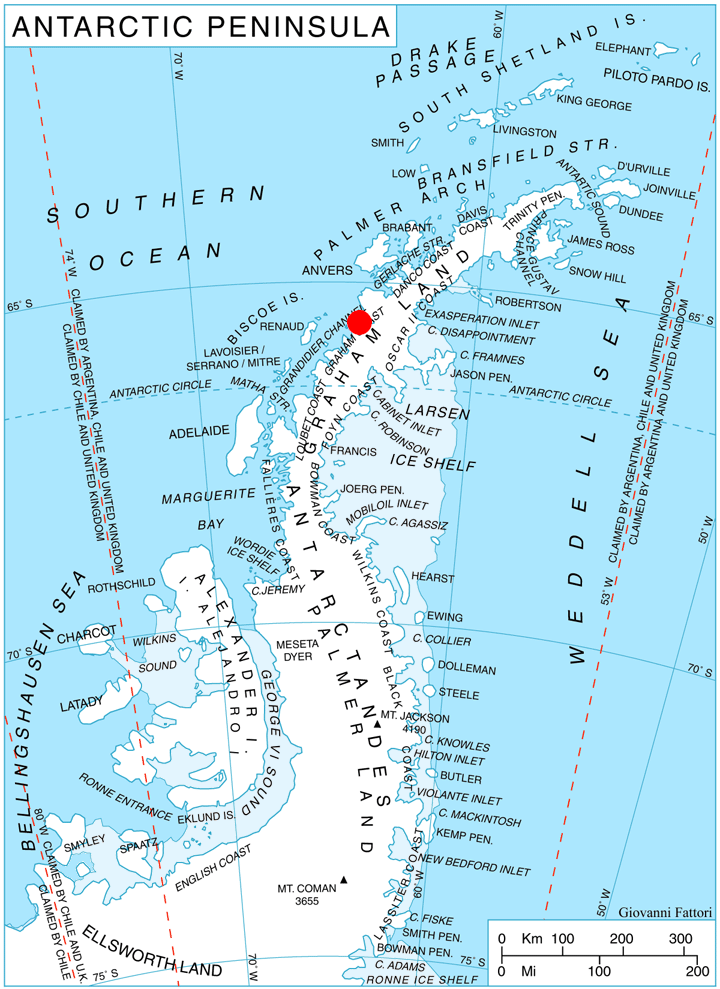
- Location of Barison Peninsula on Graham Coast, Antarctic Peninsula.
- Interactive map of Talev Glacier
- Location: Antarctica
- Coordinates: 65°37′20″S 63°55′20″W
- Length: 4 km (2.5 mi)
- Width: 2.8 km (1.7 mi)

Talev Glacier (Bulgarian: Талев ледник, romanized: Talev lednik, IPA: [ˈtalɛf ˈlɛdnik]) is the 4 km long and 2.8 km wide glacier on Barison Peninsula, Graham Coast on the west side of Antarctic Peninsula, situated west of Cadman Glacier and southeast of Butamya Glacier. It drains northeastwards, and flows into Beascochea Bay.

The glacier is named after the Bulgarian writer Dimitar Talev (1898-1966).

== Maps ==
- British Antarctic Territory. Scale 1:200000 topographic map. DOS 610 Series, Sheet W 65 62. Directorate of Overseas Surveys, Tolworth, UK, 1976.
- Antarctic Digital Database (ADD). Scale 1:250000 topographic map of Antarctica. Scientific Committee on Antarctic Research (SCAR). Since 1993, regularly upgraded and updated.

== Sources ==
- Bulgarian Antarctic Gazetteer. Antarctic Place-names Commission. (details in Bulgarian, basic data in English)
- Talev Glacier. SCAR Composite Gazetteer of Antarctica
