= Chavez Island =

Island in Graham Land, Antarctica

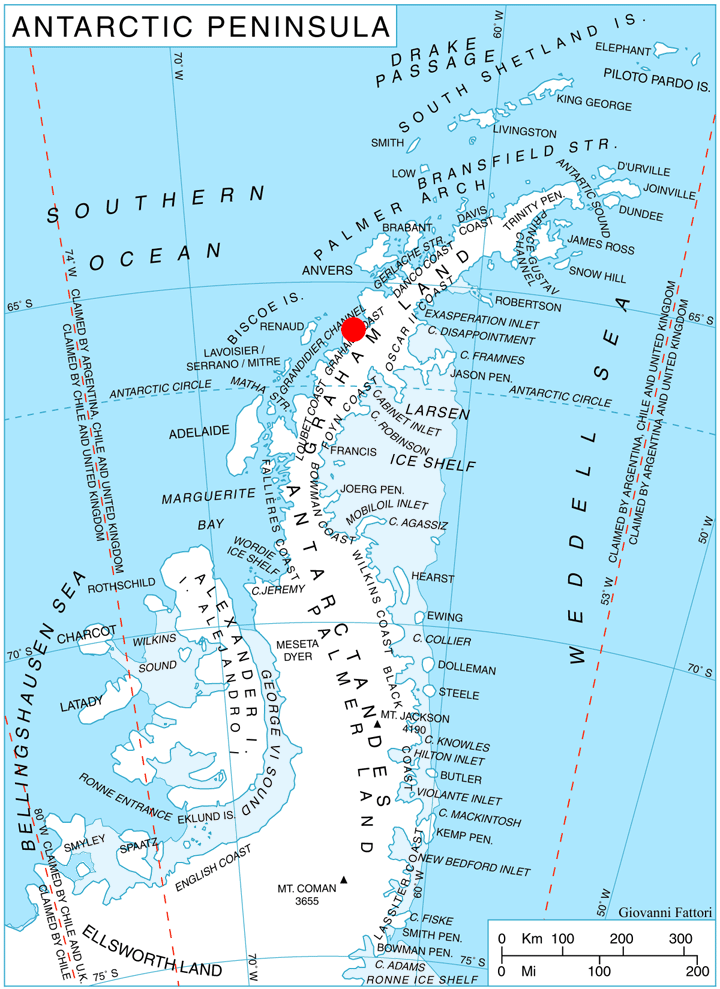
Location of Magnier Peninsula on Graham Coast, Antarctic Peninsula.

Chavez Island (65°38′S 64°32′W) is an island 3 nautical miles (6 km) long which rises to 550 metres (1,800 ft), lying immediately west of Magnier Peninsula, which is between Leroux Bay and Bigo Bay, off the west coast of Graham Land. It was discovered and named by the French Antarctic Expedition, 1908–10, under Jean-Baptiste Charcot, probably for Commandant Alfonso Chaves of Ponta Delgada, Azores, but the spelling Chavez has become established through long usage.

== See also ==
- List of Antarctic and sub-Antarctic islands
- Trickster Rocks
- Verge Rocks

== Maps ==
- British Antarctic Territory. Scale 1:200000 topographic map. DOS 610 Series, Sheet W 65 64. Directorate of Overseas Surveys, Tolworth, UK, 1971.
