= Dragomir Asenov Drama Theatre =

Drama theatre and cultural hub in the town of Montana, Bulgaria

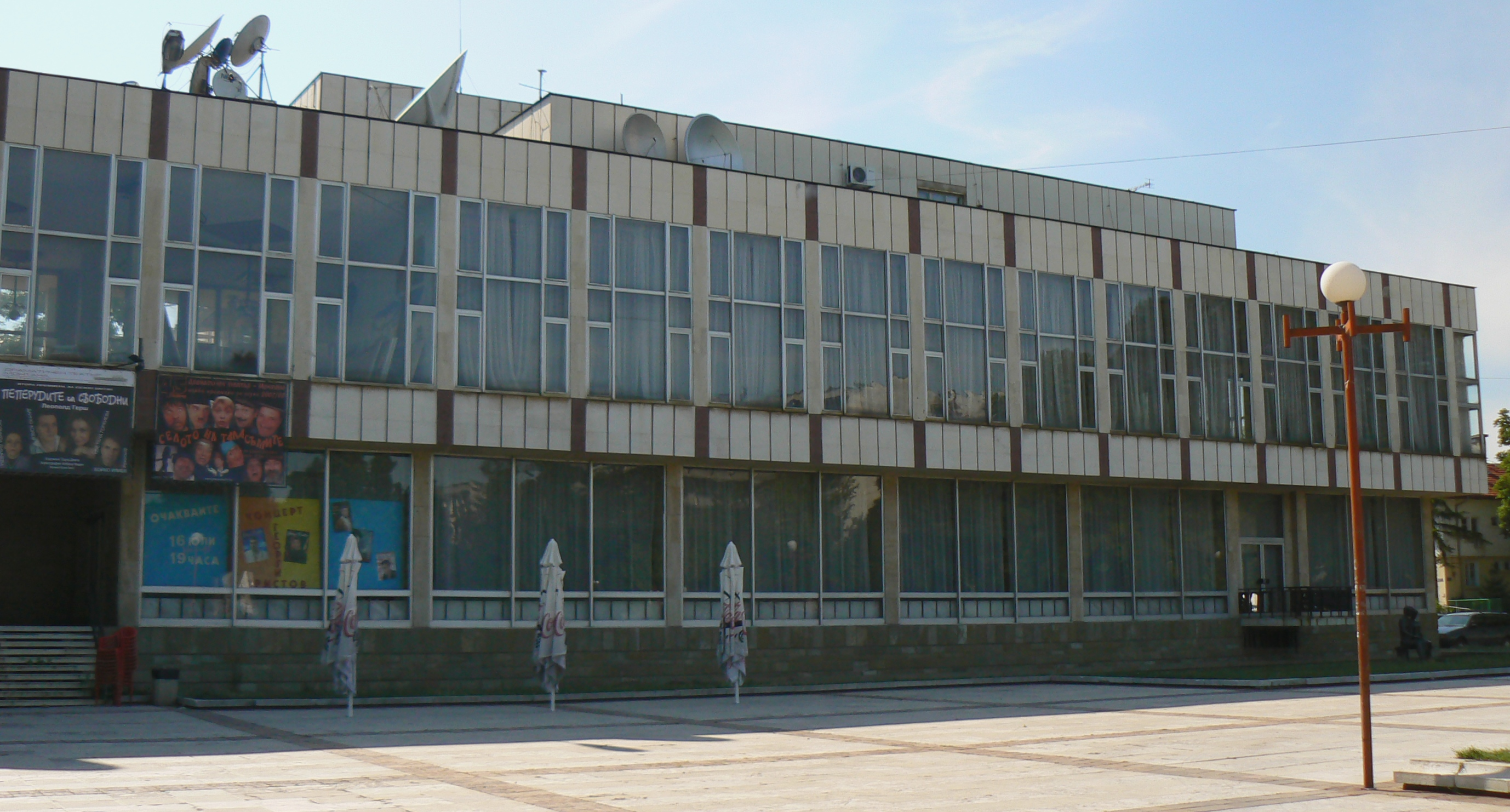
- The main theatre building
- Interactive map of Dragomir Asenov Drama Theatre
- Address: 3400 Montana Izvora Street №2; Montana, Bulgaria
- Coordinates: 43.4087°N 23.2222°E
- Type: Drama Theatre

Construction
- Built: 1962

Website
- http://theatremontana.blogspot.com/?m=1

The Dragomir Asenov Drama Theatre is a drama theatre and cultural hub in the town of Montana, Bulgaria. It is named after Dragomir Asenov (1926–1981), a notable writer and playwright from Montana.

== History ==
The theater was founded in 1962. The first performance was "Every Autumn Evening" by Ivan Peychev.

The theater has been able to achieve at least four titles per season, and usually submits a yearly report of 40 to 50 in-house productions, performances and co-productions with other theaters and touring bands from other cities. concerts are also held in the theatre occasionally.

== Description ==
The theater has 1 main hall that has 584 seats, and 2 smaller chamber halls. Several schools have been organized at the theater. It is in the town centre of Montana, being easily accessible to all.

== Notable Performances ==
- ”When thunder strikes” by PK Yavorov (1974 and 2001)
- “Vrazhalets” by Sf Kostov (1972 and 1994)
- “January” (1982)
- ”The disorders” (1996)
- “Father” by August Strindberg (1995)
- ”Iron candlestick” by Dimitar Talev (1971 and 1996)
- “The daughter” by George Karaslavov (1987)
- ”Shishman” by Kamen Zidarov (1980)
