= Nuñez Point =

Geographic location

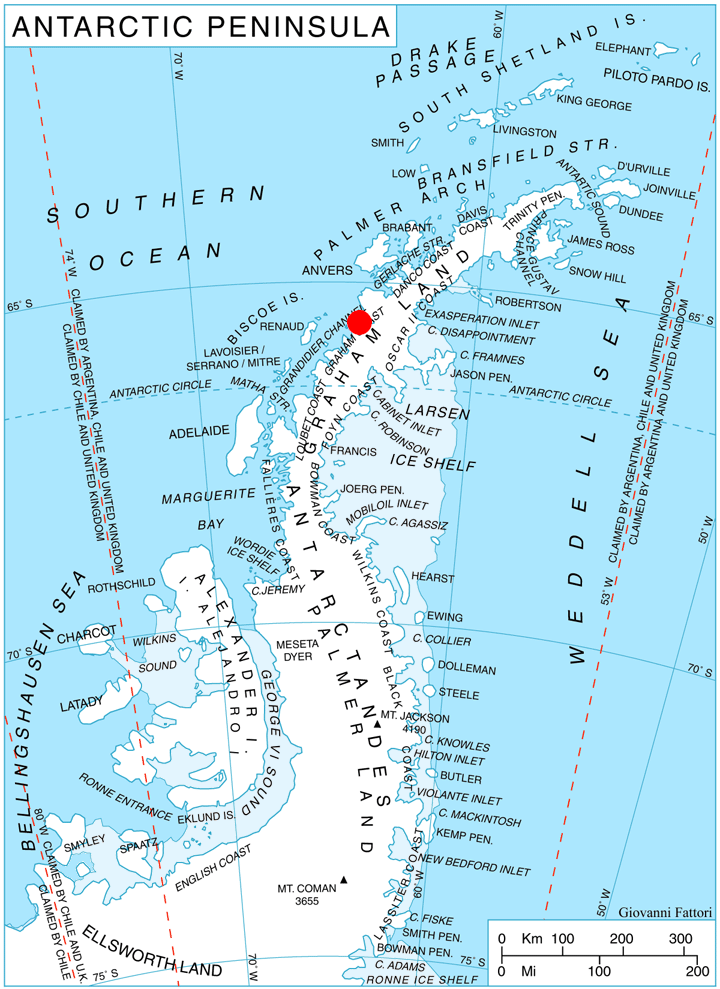
Location of Barison Peninsula on Graham Coast, Antarctic Peninsula.

Nuñez Point (65°33′S 64°15′W) is a point forming the west extremity of Takaki Promontory on Barison Peninsula on Graham Coast, Graham Land, in Antarctica. Discovered by the French Antarctic Expedition, 1903–05, and named by Charcot for Captain Nuñez, Argentine Navy.

== Maps ==
- British Antarctic Territory. Scale 1:200000 topographic map. DOS 610 Series, Sheet W 65 64. Directorate of Overseas Surveys, Tolworth, UK, 1971.
