= Nevsha Cove =

Antarctic land feature

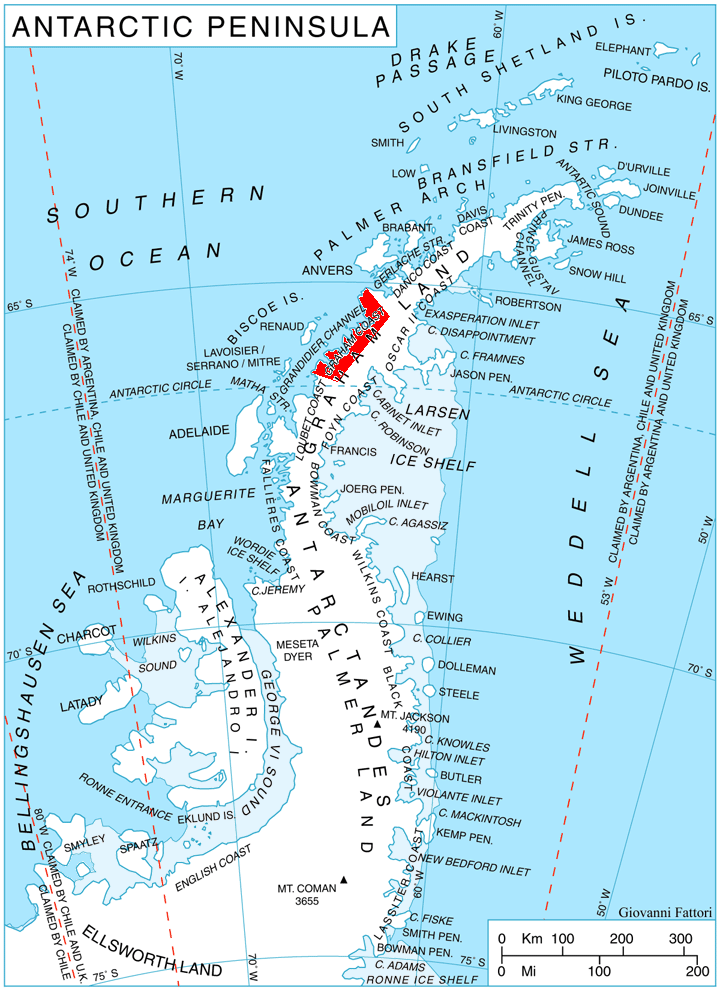
Location of Graham Coast on the Antarctic Peninsula.

Nevsha Cove (Bulgarian: залив Невша, ‘Zaliv Nevsha’ \'za-liv 'nev-sha\) is the 2.5 km wide cove indenting for 3 km Graham Coast on the Antarctic Peninsula north of Plas Point. It is part of the south arm of Beascochea Bay. The head of the cove is fed by Funk Glacier, and its shape was enhanced as a result of that glacier's retreat during the last decade of 20th century and the first decade of 21st century.

The feature is named after the settlement of Nevsha in Northeastern Bulgaria.

== Location ==
Nevsha Cove is centred at 65°34′50″S 63°45′30″W.

== Maps ==
- Antarctic Digital Database (ADD). Scale 1:250000 topographic map of Antarctica. Scientific Committee on Antarctic Research (SCAR). Since 1993, regularly upgraded and updated.
