= Takaki Promontory =

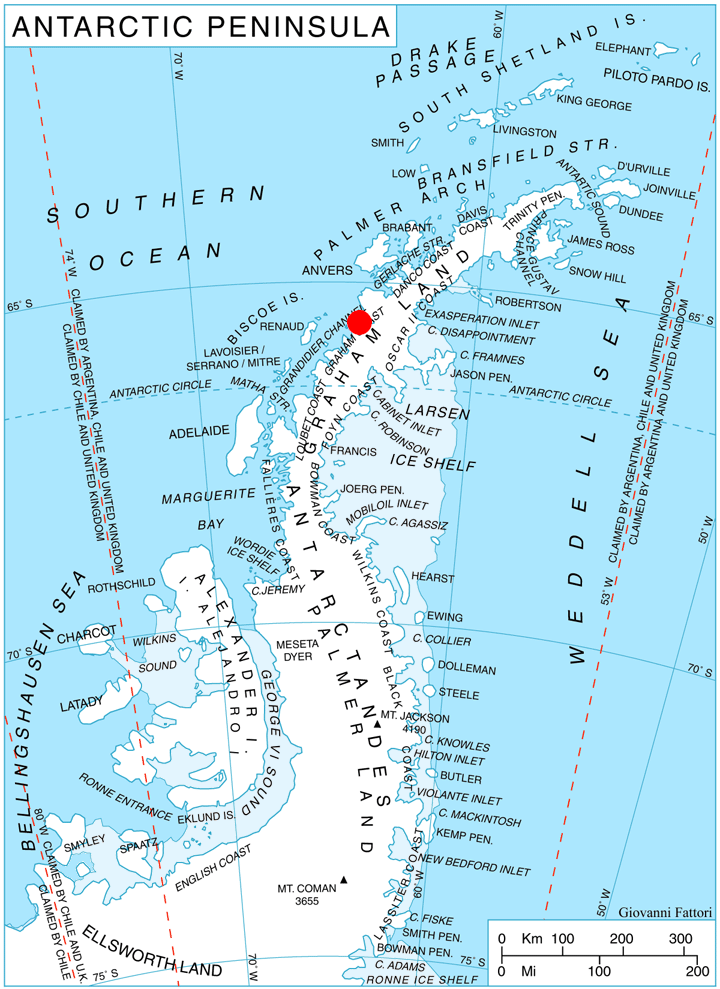
Location of Barison Peninsula on Graham Coast, Antarctic Peninsula.

Takaki Promontory (65°33′S 64°14′W) is a promontory at the northeast side of Leroux Bay, forming the west extremity of Barison Peninsula on Graham Coast, Graham Land in Antarctica. First seen and roughly charted by the French Antarctic Expedition, 1903–05, under Charcot. Named by the United Kingdom Antarctic Place-Names Committee (UK-APC) in 1959 after Baron Takaki Kanehiro (1849–1920), Director-General of the Medical Department of the Imperial Japanese Navy, the first man to prevent beriberi empirically by dietary additions, in 1882.

== Maps ==
- British Antarctic Territory. Scale 1:200000 topographic map. DOS 610 Series, Sheet W 65 64. Directorate of Overseas Surveys, Tolworth, UK, 1971.
