= Bachstrom Point =

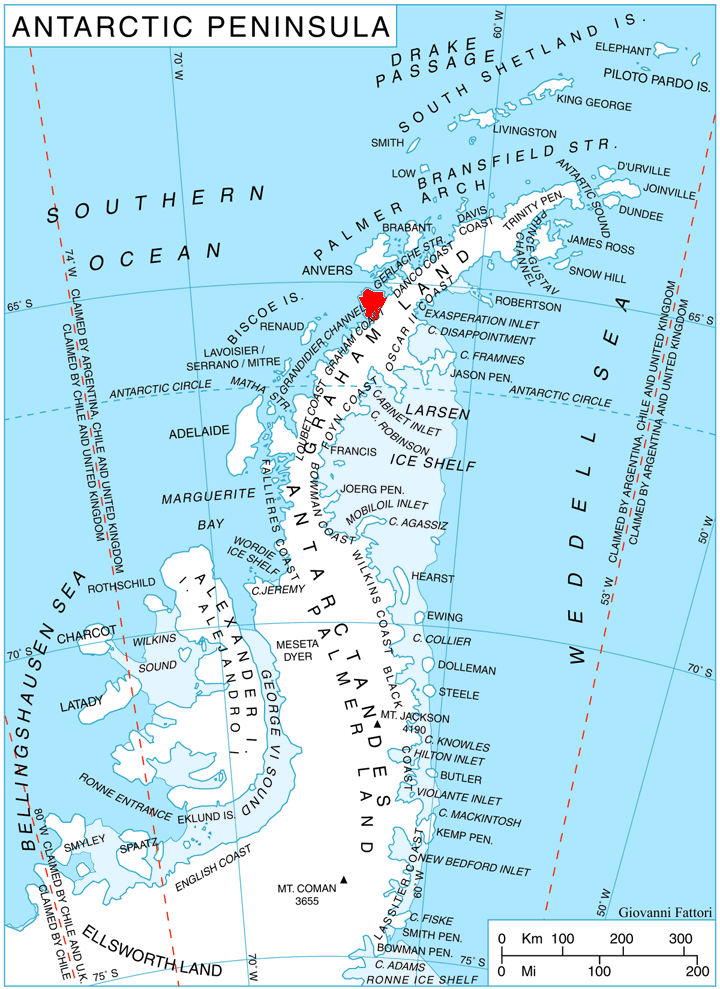
Location of Kyiv Peninsula in Graham Land, Antarctic Peninsula.

Bachstrom Point (65°29′S 63°51′W) is a headland on the northeast side of Beascochea Bay, 8 nautical miles (15 km) southeast of Cape Perez on the southwest coast of Kyiv Peninsula in Graham Land, Antarctica. It was first charted by the British Graham Land Expedition, 1934–37, under John Rymill, and named by the UK Antarctic Place-Names Committee in 1959 for Johann Bachstrom, the author in 1734 of a classic pamphlet recognizing scurvy as a nutritional deficiency disease and prescribing the necessary measures for its prevention and cure.
