= Mount Bigo =

Mountain in Graham Land, Antarctica

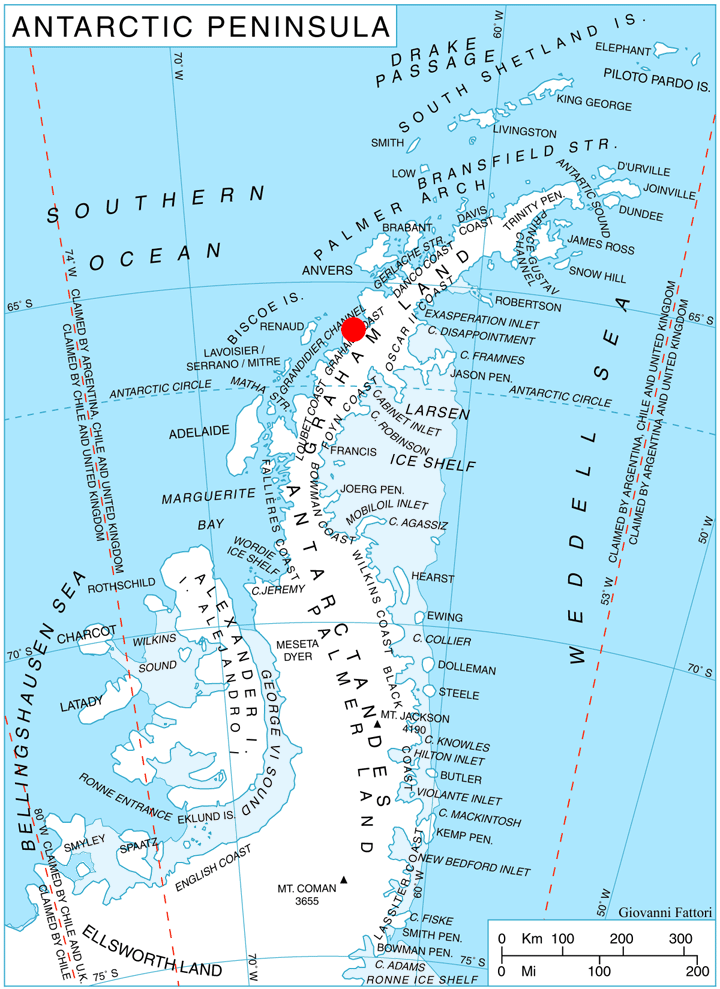
Location of Magnier Peninsula on Graham Coast, Antarctic Peninsula.

Mount Bigo (65°46′S 64°17′W) is a 1,980 m mountain in Lisiya Ridge on Magnier Peninsula, Graham Coast in Graham Land, standing immediately southwest of Mount Perchot at the head of Bigo Bay. It was discovered by the French Antarctic Expedition of 1908–10 and named by Charcot probably for Robert Bigo of Calais, a member of the Ligue Maritime Française.

== Maps ==
- British Antarctic Territory. Scale 1:200000 topographic map. DOS 610 Series, Sheet W 65 64. Directorate of Overseas Surveys, Tolworth, UK, 1971.
