= Link Stack =

Link Stack (65°36′S 64°34′W) is a rocky pillar at the northwest end of Chavez Island, off the west coast of Graham Land, Antarctica. It was charted by the British Graham Land Expedition under John Rymill, 1934–37. The stack was so named by the UK Antarctic Place-Names Committee in 1959 because it was here that the 1957 winter surveys by the Falkland Islands Dependencies Survey from the Prospect Point station were linked with the 1957–58 summer surveys by the British Naval Hydrographic Survey Unit. It is one of many named rock formations of Graham Land.
