= Paragon Point =

Paragon Point (65°38′S 64°17′W) is a small but prominent point on the southwest side of Leroux Bay, 3 nautical miles (6 km) west-southwest of Eijkman Point on the west coast of Graham Land. Charted by the British Graham Land Expedition (BGLE) under Rymill, 1934–37. So named by the United Kingdom Antarctic Place-Names Committee (UK-APC) in 1959.
