= Chargan, Yambol Province =

Chargan
- Location of Chargan
- Coordinates: 42°28′51″N 26°37′26″E
- Country: Bulgaria
- Provinces (Oblast): Yambol

Government
  - Mayor: Dimityr Czobanow
- Elevation: 195 m (640 ft)

Population (2011)
  - Total: 576
- Time zone: UTC+2 (EET)
  - Summer (DST): UTC+3 (EEST)
- Postal Code: 8628
- Area code: 04717

Chargan (Bulgarian: Чарган) - a village in South-Eastern Bulgaria in the Yambol Province, in the Tundzha Municipality. According to the National Institute of Statistics, in the year of 2011, the village had 576 inhabitants.

== Honours ==
Chargan Ridge in Graham Land, Antarctica is named after the village.
