= Verge Rocks =

Verge Rocks (65°34′S 64°34′W) is a two rocks lying 2 nautical miles (3.7 km) north of Chavez Island, off the west coast of Graham Land. It was mapped by the Falkland Islands Dependencies Survey (FIDS) from photos taken by Hunting Aerosurveys Ltd. in 1956–57, and was named by the United Kingdom Antarctic Place-Names Committee (UK-APC) because the rocks lie on the edge of Grandidier Channel.
