= Trickster Rocks =

Trickster Rocks (65°36′S 64°36′W) are several small rocks emerging from the sea less than 1 nautical mile (1.9 km) northwest of Chavez Island in Grandidier Channel, off the west coast of Graham Land. So named by United Kingdom Antarctic Place-Names Committee (UK-APC) because the rocks escaped notice of the 1957 Falkland Islands Dependencies Survey (FIDS) survey party, as they were thought to be icebergs. The feature was photographed by Hunting Aerosurveys Ltd., 1957–58.
