= Luke Glacier =

Glacier in Antarctica

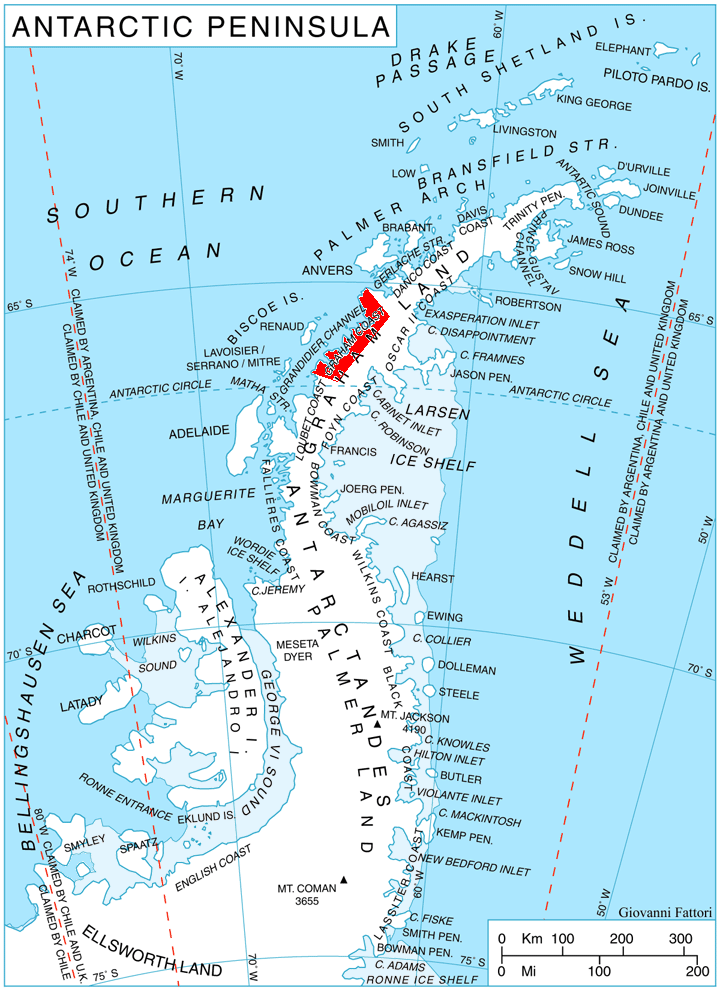
Location of Graham Coast on the Antarctic Peninsula.

Luke Glacier (65°42′S 64°2′W) is a glacier at least 15 nautical miles (28 km) long, flowing northwest into the head of Leroux Bay on the west coast of Graham Land, Antarctica. It is surmounted by Mount Chevreux on the south, Mount Perchot on the southwest and Mount Radotina on the northeast. The glacier was first sighted and roughly surveyed in 1909 by the Fourth French Antarctic Expedition. It was resurveyed in 1935–36 by the British Graham Land Expedition and later named for George Lawson Johnston, 1st Baron Luke of Pavenham, Chairman of Bovril Ltd, who contributed toward the cost of the expedition.
