= Dimitar Talev =

Bulgarian writer and member of the Bulgarian National Assembly (1898 - 1966)

Dimitar Talev Димитър Талев
- Димитър Талев
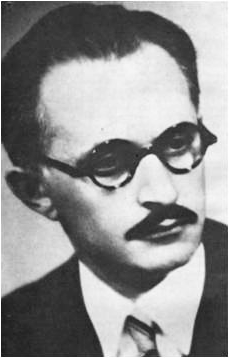
- Dimitar Talev (1930s)
- Born: 1 September 1898; Prilep, Ottoman Empire
- Died: 20 October 1966 (aged 68); Sofia, Bulgaria
- Occupations: journalist, editor, writer
- Spouse: Irina Taleva
- Children: Bratislav Talev; Vladimir Talev
- Writing career
- Years active: 1917–1966
- Genres: story, novel
- Subjects: history, politics, national liberation struggles, people's psychology
- Movement: Realism

Dimitar Talev (Bulgarian: Димитър Талев) (1 September 1898 – 20 October 1966) was a Bulgarian writer, journalist, political prisoner, and member of the Bulgarian National Assembly.

== Biography ==
Born in Prilep, in the Manastir Vilayet of the Ottoman Empire (present-day North Macedonia), Talev studied at the Bulgarian Men's High School of Thessaloniki, the Bulgarian pedagogical school of Skopje and later in Stara Zagora and Bitola. He studied medicine and philosophy in Zagreb and Vienna, and Slavic philology in Sofia University (1925).

Talev was the managing editor of the Macedonia newspaper, and a contributor and editor in the Zora newspaper. The former gradually became an organ of the right wing of Ivan Mihailov's Internal Macedonian Revolutionary Organization. At that time Talev began to propagate for a Macedonia within the borders of the Kingdom of Bulgaria. He viewed the occupation of Vardar Macedonia by Bulgaria in 1941 as a successful end to the Macedonian Struggle.

The new political situation after the 1944 communist coup changed Bulgaria's policy on the Macedonian issue. Talev was declared a "fascist" and a "Greater Bulgarian chauvinist. He was arrested by the communist authorities and was sent to the Sofia Central Prison and later to a forced labour camps. Talev was expelled from the Bulgarian Writers' Union and from 1948 to 1952 he was exiled to Lukovit. After Valko Chervenkov was replaced by Todor Zhivkov, Talev was declared by the new government as unlawfully repressed and was subsequently pardoned and rehabilitated. His membership in the author's union was restored and he would be elected to its governing board. Zhivkov's government awarded Talev three awards in the field of literation - in 1959, 1963 and 1966, respectively. In 1966 Talev was elected as MP in the 31st Narodno Sabranie (Bulgarian Parliament).

Talev Glacier on Graham Land, Antarctica is named after Dimitar Talev.

== Literary work ==
Talev published his first story in 1917 in the newspaper "Rodina" (Motherland), Skopje. Later he continued to publish his literary texts in periodicals in Bulgaria and abroad. His first book, "The Tears of my Mother" was published in 1925. It was a collection of stories and tales for children. He published several more books, notably his tetralogy "The Iron Candlestick", "The Bells of Prespa", "Ilinden" and "I Hear Your Voices".

In 2016, the Ministry of Culture of Bulgaria sent an inquiry to the authorities in the Republic of Macedonia due to copyright violations regarding the translation and publication of parts of Talev's tetralogy by a private publishing house. The novels of Dimitar Talev were translated with dozens of pages cut out and replacement of the word "Bulgarian" with "Macedonian" in the text. The case reached the European Parliament. In 2021, Bulgarian President Rumen Radev sent original copies of the tetralogy to North Macedonia, stating that the persecution of Bulgarian books and their falsification must remain irretrievably in the past.

=== Novels ===
- Arduous Years (Bulgarian: Усилни години)
  - Part 1. In The Dusk of Morning (Bulgarian: В дрезгавината на утрото) 1928
  - Part 2. Revival (Bulgarian: Подем) 1929
  - Part 3. Ilinden (Bulgarian: Илинден) 1930
- The Iron Candlestick (Bulgarian: Железният светилник) 1952
- Ilinden (Bulgarian: Илинден) 1953
- Kiprovets Arose (Bulgarian: Кипровец въстана) 1954
- The Bells of Prespa (Bulgarian: Преспанските камбани) 1954
- Samuil (Bulgarian: Самуил)
  - Book 1. Shields of Stone (Bulgarian: Щитове каменни) 1958
  - Book 2. Cinderella and the Prince (Bulgarian: Пепеляшка и царския син) 1959
  - Book 3. Downfall (Bulgarian: Погибел) 1960
- I Hear Your Voices (Bulgarian: Гласовете ви чувам) 1966

=== Short stories and collections ===
- The Golden Key (Bulgarian: Златният ключ) 1935
- The Great King (Bulgarian: Великият цар) 1937
- The Old House (Bulgarian: Старата къща) 1938
- Novels and short stories (Bulgarian: Повести и разкази) 1962
