= Funk Glacier =

Glacier in Antarctica

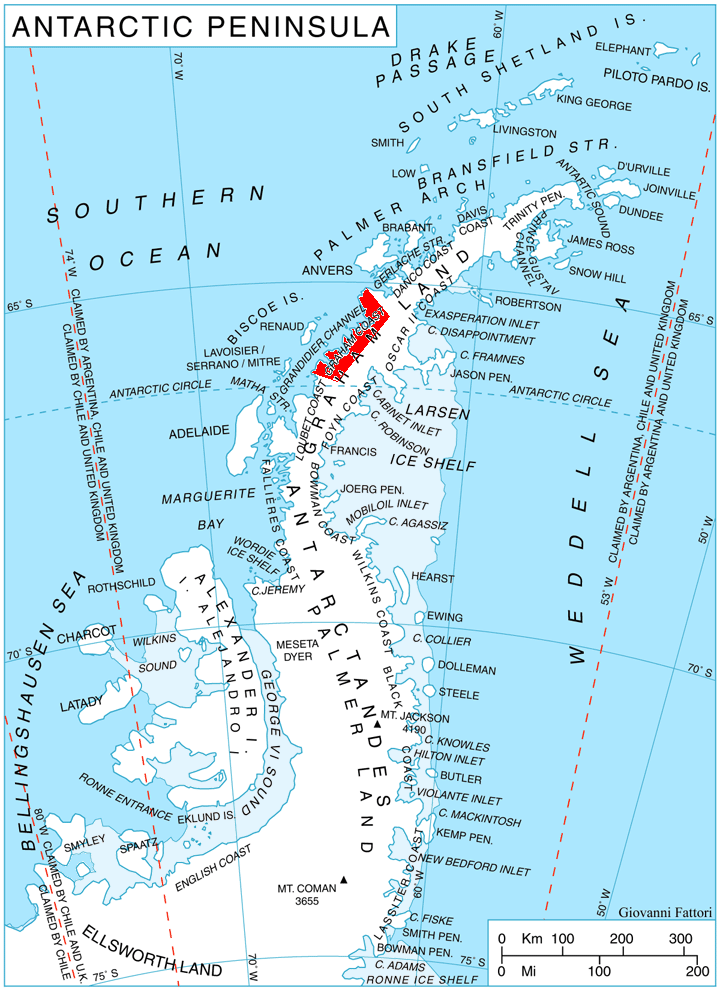
Location of Graham Coast on the Antarctic Peninsula.

Funk Glacier (65°34′S 63°46′W) is a glacier flowing into the head of Nevsha Cove in Beascochea Bay to the south of Frölich Peak, on the west coast of Graham Land, Antarctica. It was first charted by the French Antarctic Expedition, 1908–10, under Jean-Baptiste Charcot. It was named by the UK Antarctic Place-Names Committee in 1959 for Casimir Funk, an American (formerly Polish) biochemist who, while working at the Lister Institute in London in 1912, originated the theory of vitamins.
