= Takaki Kanehiro =

Japanese naval physician (1849–1920)

Takaki Kanehiro 高木 兼寛
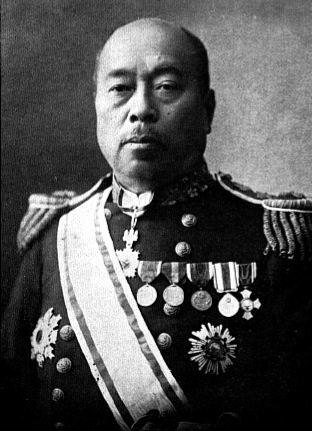
- Takaki as a surgeon general of the IJN
- Born: 30 October 1849; Takaoka, Hyūga Province, Tokugawa shogunate
- Died: 12 April 1920 (aged 70); Tokyo, Empire of Japan
- Known for: First successful prevention of beriberi

Baron Takaki Kanehiro (高木 兼寛; 30 October 1849 – 12 April 1920) was a Japanese naval physician best known for identifying the first effective preventive measure against beriberi, a disease caused by vitamin B1 (thiamine) deficiency. His pioneering work focused on combating the high incidence of beriberi among sailors in the Imperial Japanese Navy (IJN), who had subsisted on a diet primarily composed of polished white rice.

== Early life ==
Born in Takaoka-cho, Hyūga Province (present-day Miyazaki Prefecture) as the son of a samurai retainer to the Satsuma domain, Takaki Kanehiro studied Chinese medicine as a youth and served as a medic in the Boshin War. He later studied western medical science under British doctor William Willis (in Japan 1861–1881). Takaki entered the IJN as a medical officer in 1872. He was sent to Great Britain for medical studies in 1875, and interned at St Thomas's Hospital Medical School (now part of King's College London) in London. He returned to Japan in 1880.

== Work on beriberi ==
During the Edo period, the consumption of polished white rice, once largely restricted to the upper classes, began to spread among lower-ranking samurai and urban townspeople, often forming the bulk of their diet with few side dishes. This dietary shift contributed to the rising prevalence of beriberi (vitamin B_{1} deficiency), particularly in major cities such as Kyoto, Nagoya, Edo (modern Tokyo), and Osaka by the late 17th century. In contrast, rural populations and farmers, who relied on less refined brown rice and mixed grains with higher thiamine content, were largely spared from the disease.

With the onset of the Meiji era and its accompanying economic growth, refined white rice became more widely accessible across social classes. Takaki attributed this change in part to the 1873 land tax reform, which allowed taxes to be paid in cash rather than rice, enabling farmers to retain and consume more of their rice harvest. The resulting popularization of a polished white rice diet contributed to the nationwide spread of beriberi, a development central to Takaki’s later investigations into its causes.

In the 1880s, beriberi (considered endemic to Japan) was a serious problem on warships and was affecting naval efficiency. Takaki knew that beriberi was not common among Western navies. He also noticed that Japanese naval officers, whose diet consisted of various types of vegetables and meat, rarely suffered from beriberi. On the other hand, the disease was common among ordinary crewmen, whose diet consisted almost exclusively of white rice (which was supplied for free, whereas other foods had to be purchased). Many crewmen were from poor families, who had to send money back home, they often tried to save money by eating nothing but rice.

In 1883 Takaki learned of a high incidence of beriberi amongst cadets on a training mission from Japan to Hawaii, via New Zealand and South America that lasted for 9 months. Onboard, 169 men out of 376 developed the disease and 25 died. Takaki made a petition to Emperor Meiji to fund an experiment with an improved diet for the seamen that included more barley, meat, milk, bread and vegetables. He succeeded, and in 1884, another mission took the same route, but this time only sixteen beriberi cases among 333 seamen were reported. This experiment convinced the IJN that poor diet was the prime factor in beriberi, and the disease was soon eliminated from the fleet. Takaki's discovery resulted in the popularization of Japanese curry (nicknamed navy curry) in the navy, a dish that was nutritious and easy to cook in mass quantities.

Takaki's success occurred ten years before Christiaan Eijkman, working in Batavia, advanced his theory that beriberi was caused by a nutritional deficiency, with his later identification of vitamin B_{1} earning Eijkman the 1929 Nobel Prize in Physiology or Medicine.

Although Takaki clearly established that the cause was due to nutritional issues, this conflicted with the prevailing idea among medical scientists that beriberi was an infectious disease. The Imperial Japanese Army, which was dominated by Mori Ōgai and other doctors from Tokyo Imperial University, persisted in their belief that beriberi was an infectious disease, and refused to implement a remedy for decades. In the Russo-Japanese War of 1904–1905, over 200,000 soldiers suffered from beriberi – 27,000 fatally, compared to 47,000 deaths from combat.

In 1905, Takaki was ennobled with the title of danshaku (baron) under the kazoku peerage system for his contribution of eliminating beriberi from the IJN, and was also awarded the Order of the Rising Sun (first class). He was later affectionately nicknamed "Barley Baron".

Takaki founded the Sei-I-Kwai medical society in January 1881. In May, 1881, he founded the Sei-I-Kwai Koshujo (Sei-I-Kwai Medical Training School), now the Jikei University School of Medicine. Takaki's school was the first private medical college in Japan, and was the first in Japan to have students dissect human cadavers. In 1900 he was granted the court rank of Junior Third Rank.

Takaki was posthumously honored by having a peninsula in Antarctica at 65°33′S 64°34′W named "Takaki Promontory" in his honor. It is the only peninsula in Antarctica named after a Japanese person.

== See also ==
- Joseph Goldberger

== Bibliography ==
- Bay, Alexander. "Beriberi in Modern Japan: The Making of a National Disease". University of Rochester Press (2012). ISBN 9781580464277.
- Low, Morris. Building a Modern Japan: Science, Technology, and Medicine in the Meiji Era and Beyond. Palgrave Macmillan (2005). ISBN 1-4039-6832-2.
- Matsuda, Makoto. Kakke o nakushita otoko Takaki Kanehiro den. Kodansha (1990). ISBN 4-06-204487-0.
- Kenneth J. Carpenter. Beriberi, White Rice and Vitamin B. University of California Press.
