= Holst Point =

Holst Point (65°32′S 63°50′W) is a point at the head of Beascochea Bay which divides it into two arms, on the west coast of Graham Land, Antarctica. It was first charted by the British Graham Land Expedition under John Rymill, 1934–37, and was named by the UK Antarctic Place-Names Committee in 1959 for Axel Holst, a Norwegian biochemist who in 1907, with Theodor C.B. Frølich, first produced experimental scurvy and laid the foundations for later work on vitamins.
