= Magnier Peaks =

Mountains in Antarctica

The Magnier Peaks (65°40′S 64°18′W) are two mountain peaks, the higher at 1,345 metres (4,410 ft), surmounting the peninsula between Leroux Bay and Bigo Bay on the west coast of Graham Land, Antarctica. These peaks were discovered and named by the Fourth French Antarctic Expedition, 1908–10, under Jean-Baptiste Charcot.
