= Comrie Glacier =

Glacier in Antarctica

Comrie Glacier (65°48′S 64°20′W) is a glacier 13 nautical miles (24 km) long, flowing west to enter the head of Bigo Bay on the west coast of Graham Land. It was first sighted and roughly surveyed by the French Antarctic Expedition in 1909. It was resurveyed in 1935–36 by the British Graham Land Expedition (BGLE), and later named for Leslie J. Comrie, founder and first director of the Scientific Computing Service Ltd, London, who, as superintendent of HM Nautical Almanac Office in 1934, greatly assisted the BGLE, 1934–37, by providing advance copies of The Nautical Almanac up to 1937.
