= Eijkman Point =

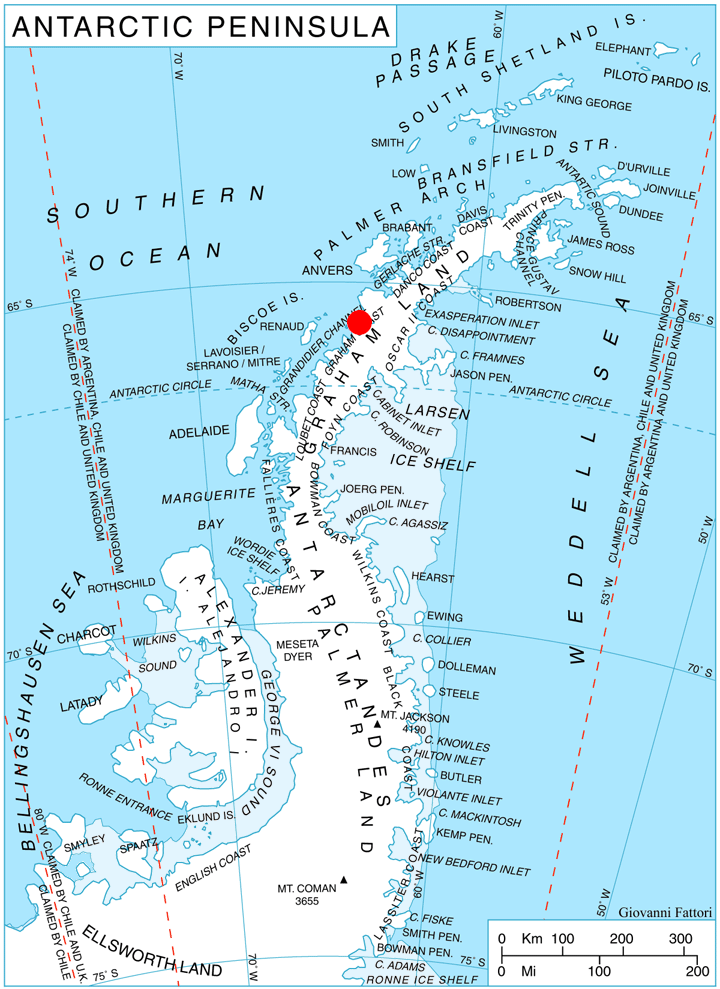
Location of Barison Peninsula on Graham Coast, Antarctic Peninsula.

Eijkman Point (65°37′S 64°10′W) is the extremity of a rocky spur projecting into Leroux Bay from the west coast of Barison Peninsula on Graham Coast, Graham Land, on the west side of the entrance to Macrobius Cove and 4 nautical miles (7 km) south-southeast of Nunez Point. It was first mapped by the British Graham Land Expedition under John Rymill 1934–37, and was named by the UK Antarctic Place-Names Committee in 1959 for Christiaan Eijkman, a Dutch biologist who in 1890–97 first produced experimental beriberi and initiated work on its prevention.

== Maps ==
- British Antarctic Territory. Scale 1:200000 topographic map. DOS 610 Series, Sheet W 65 64. Directorate of Overseas Surveys, Tolworth, UK, 1971.
