= Beascochea Bay =

Bay in Antarctica

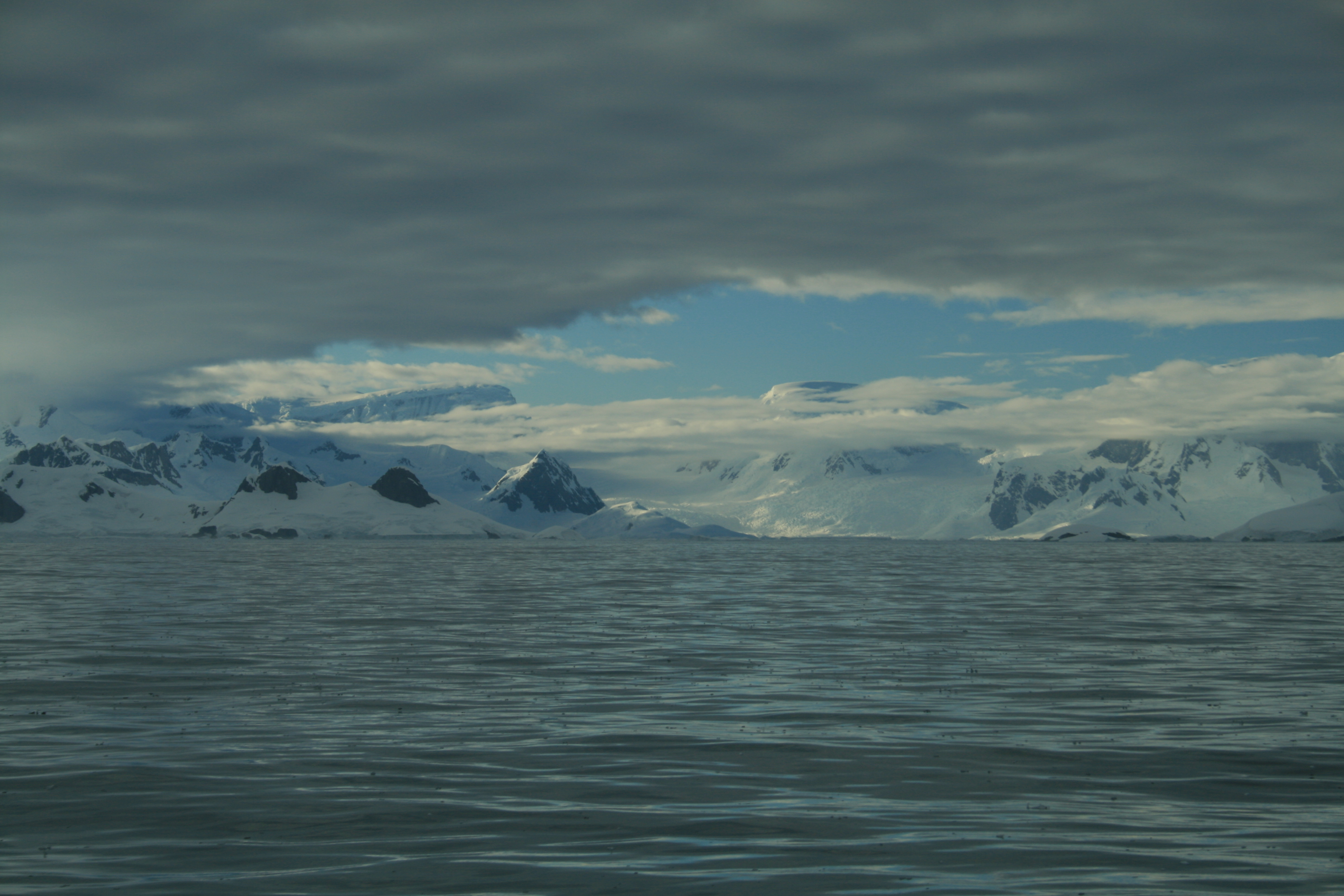
Beascochea Bay

Beascochea Bay (65°30′S 64°0′W) is a bay, 10 nautical miles (19 km) long and 5 nautical miles (9 km) wide, indenting the Graham Coast of Graham Land, Antarctica, between Kyiv Peninsula and Barison Peninsula, and entered south of Cape Perez. The glaciers Lever, Funk, Cadman, Talev and Butamya feed the bay.

It was discovered but incompletely defined by the Belgian Antarctic Expedition, 1897–99; was resighted by the French Antarctic Expedition, 1903–05, and named by Jean-Baptiste Charcot for Commander Beascochea, Argentine Navy. The bay was then more accurately charted by the British Graham Land Expedition, 1934–37.

== Maps ==
- Antarctic Digital Database (ADD). Scale 1:250000 topographic map of Antarctica. Scientific Committee on Antarctic Research (SCAR). Since 1993, regularly upgraded and updated.

== See also ==
- Bachstrom Point
