= Cadman Glacier =

Glacier in Antarctica

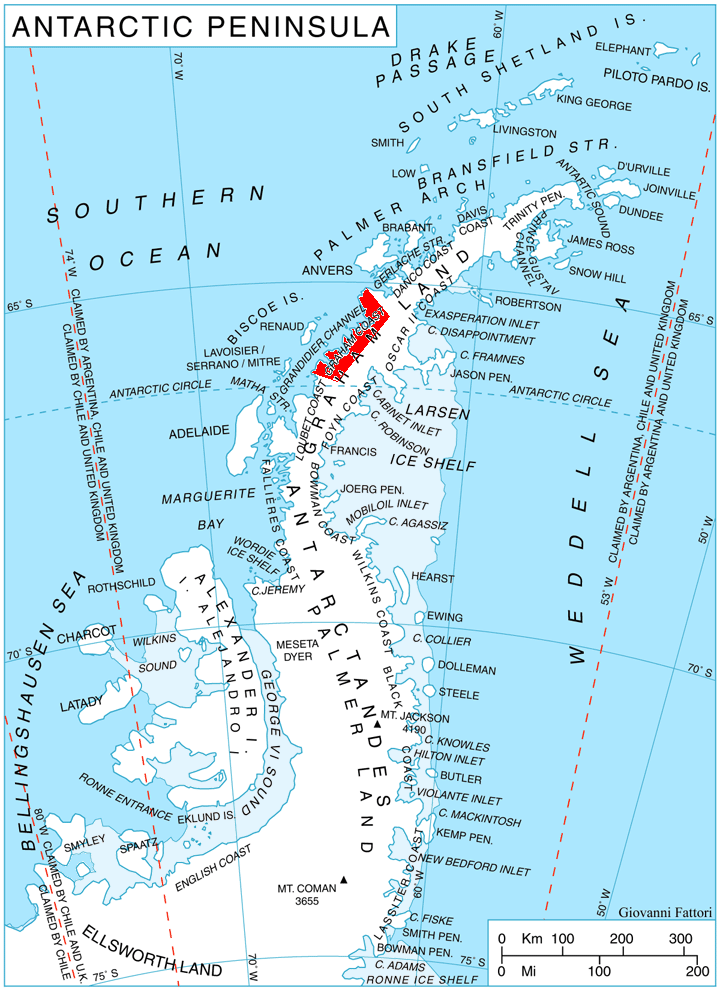
- Location of Graham Coast on the Antarctic Peninsula

- Location within Antarctica
- Location: Graham Land
- Coordinates: 65°37′00″S 63°47′00″W
- Thickness: unknown
- Highest elevation: 295 m (968 ft)
- Terminus: Erskine Glacier
- Status: unknown

Cadman Glacier (65°37′S 63°47′W) is a glacier, 1.5 nautical miles (3 km) wide at its mouth and about 7 nautical miles (13 km) long, flowing northwestward into the head of the southern arm of Beascochea Bay south of Plas Point on the west side of the Antarctic Peninsula.

== History ==
The glacier was discovered and roughly surveyed in 1909 by the French Antarctic Expedition under Jean-Baptiste Charcot. It was surveyed in 1935 by the British Graham Land Expedition (BGLE), led by John Rymill, and later named for John Cadman, 1st Baron Cadman of Silverdale, who contributed toward the cost of the BGLE, 1934–37.

== See also ==
- List of glaciers in the Antarctic
- Glaciology
