= Mount Perchot =

Mountain in Graham Land, Antarctica

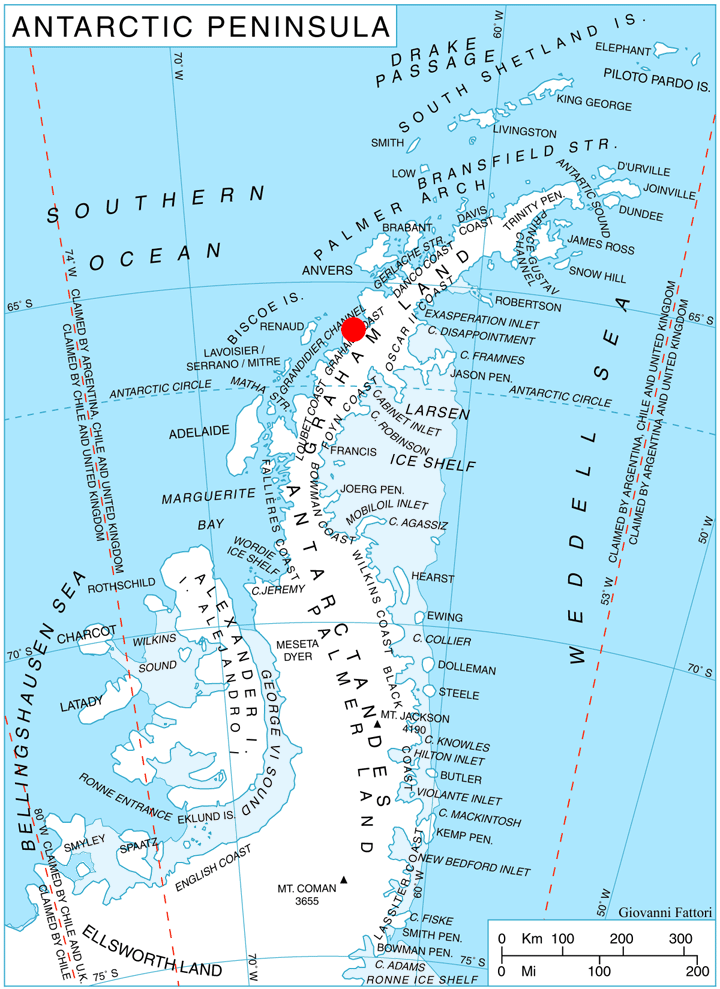
Location of Magnier Peninsula on Graham Coast, Antarctic Peninsula.

Mount Perchot (65°44′S 64°10′W) is a mountain, 2,040 m, surmounted by Lisiya Ridge, a prominent ridge extending in a general north–south direction, standing 4 nautical miles (7 km) southeast of Magnier Peaks on Magnier Peninsula, Graham Coast in Graham Land, Antarctica. Discovered by the French Antarctic Expedition, 1908–10, and named by Charcot for Monsieur Perchot, an acquaintance who donated seventy pairs of boots to the expedition.

== Maps ==
- British Antarctic Territory. Scale 1:200000 topographic map. DOS 610 Series, Sheet W 65 64. Directorate of Overseas Surveys, Tolworth, UK, 1971.
