= Mount Chevreux =

Mountain in Graham Land, Antarctica

Mount Chevreux (65°46′S 64°0′W) is a mountain, 1,615 metres (5,300 ft) high, standing 5 nautical miles (9 km) southeast of Leroux Bay on the west coast of Graham Land in Antarctica. It was discovered by the French Antarctic Expedition, 1908–10, under Jean-Baptiste Charcot, who named it for Edouard Chevreux, a French zoologist.
