= Bigo Bay =

Bay on the Antarctic peninsula

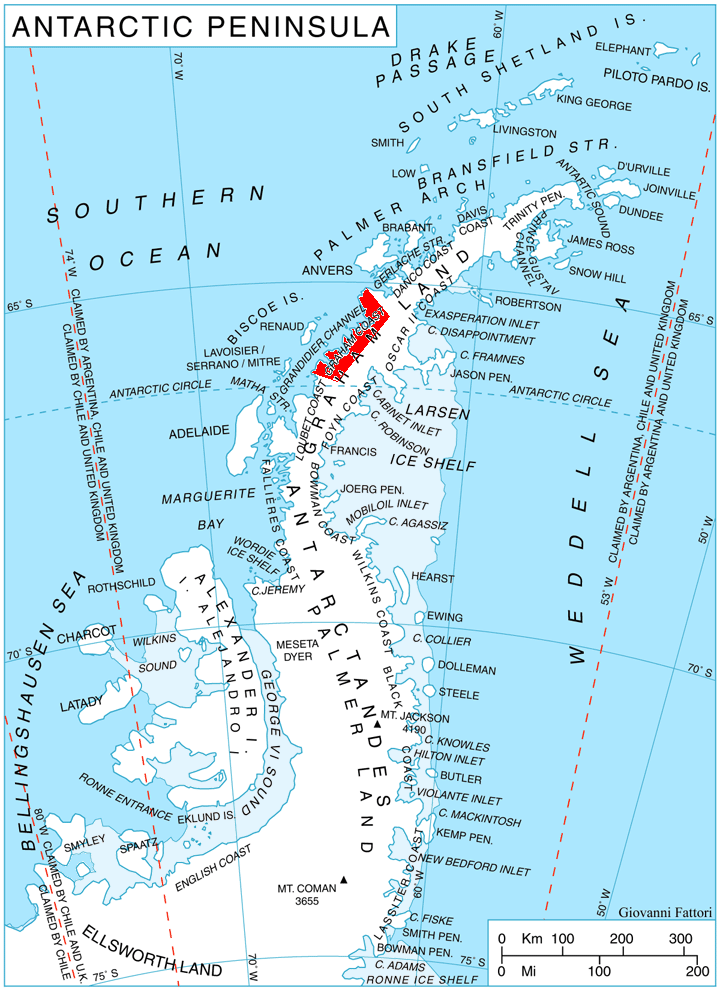
Location of Graham Coast on the Antarctic Peninsula.

Bigo Bay (65°43′S 64°30′W) is a bay 8 nautical miles (15 km) long and 6 nautical miles (11 km) wide, indenting the west coast of Graham Land between Cape Garcia and Magnier Peninsula surmounted by the Magnier Peaks and Lisiya Ridge.

The French Antarctic Expedition, 1908–10, first sighted this bay but charted it as the southern part of Leroux Bay. The British Graham Land Expedition, 1934–37, determined that the peninsula surmounted by the Magnier Peaks separates this bay from Leroux Bay. It was named by John Rymill after Mount Bigo, a mountain at the head of the bay.

== Maps ==
- Antarctic Digital Database (ADD). Scale 1:250000 topographic map of Antarctica. Scientific Committee on Antarctic Research (SCAR), 1993–2016.
