= Barison Peninsula =

Peninsula in Antarctica

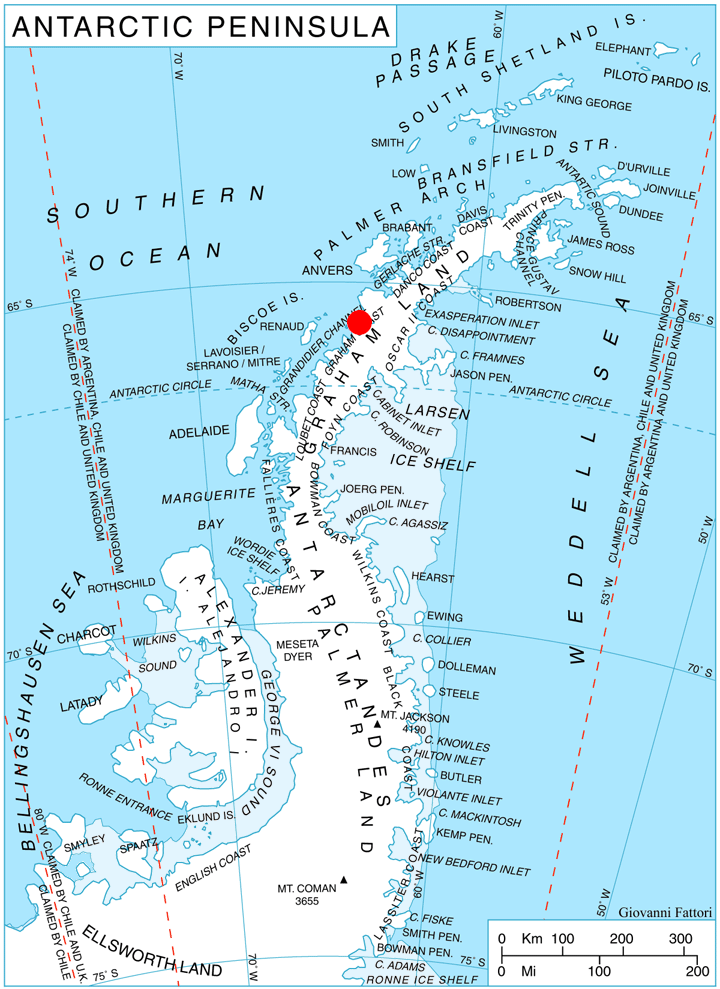
Location of Barison Peninsula on Graham Coast, Antarctic Peninsula.

Barison Peninsula is the mostly ice-covered peninsula projecting 19 km (12 mi) in northwest direction from Graham Coast in Graham Land, Antarctica. It is 12 km (7.5 mi) wide between Beascochea Bay to the northeast and Leroux Bay to the southwest. The area was possibly visited by the 1897–99 Belgian expedition under Adrien de Gerlache and the 1903–05 French expedition under Jean Charcot.

The peninsula was named by the 1973–74 Chilean Antarctic Expedition for Captain Eduardo Barison Roberts, commander of the expedition naval vessel Yelcho.

== Location ==
Barison Peninsula is centred at 65°37′00″S 64°02′00″W. The British mapped the peninsula in 1971 and 1976.

== Maps ==
- British Antarctic Territory. Scale 1:200000 topographic map. DOS 610 Series, Sheet W 65 64. Directorate of Overseas Surveys, Tolworth, UK, 1971
- British Antarctic Territory. Scale 1:200000 topographic map. DOS 610 Series, Sheet W 65 62. Directorate of Overseas Surveys, Tolworth, UK, 1976
