= Leroux Bay =

Bay on the Northern coast of the Antarctic peninsula

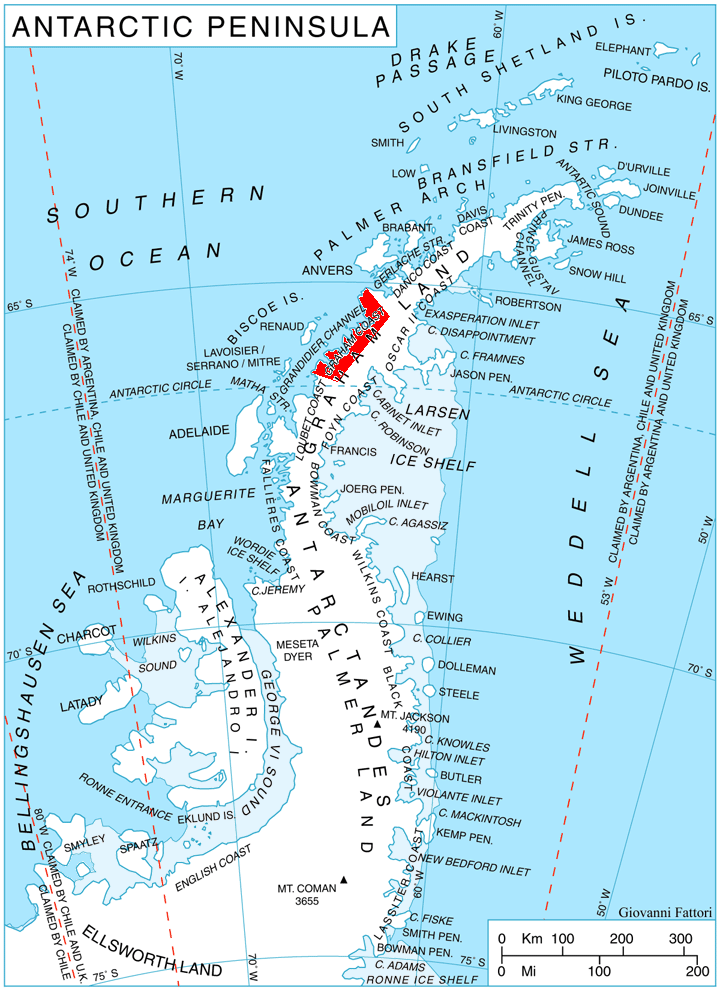
Location of Graham Coast on the Antarctic Peninsula.

Leroux Bay (65°36′S 64°16′W) is a bay 9 nautical miles (17 km) long in a northwest–southeast direction and averaging 5 nautical miles (9 km) wide, between Nunez Point and the narrow Magnier Peninsula surmounted by the Magnier Peaks and Lisiya Ridge, along the west coast of Graham Land, Antarctica. The glaciers Chernomen, Luke and Muldava feed the bay.

It was discovered by the French Antarctic Expedition, 1903–05, and named by Jean-Baptiste Charcot for Commander Leroux of the Argentine Navy. The bay was more accurately delineated by the British Graham Land Expedition in 1935.

== External link (map) ==
- Antarctic Digital Database (ADD). Scale 1:250000 topographic map of Antarctica. Scientific Committee on Antarctic Research (SCAR), 1993–2016.
