= Magnier Peninsula =

Peninsula of Northwestern Antarctica

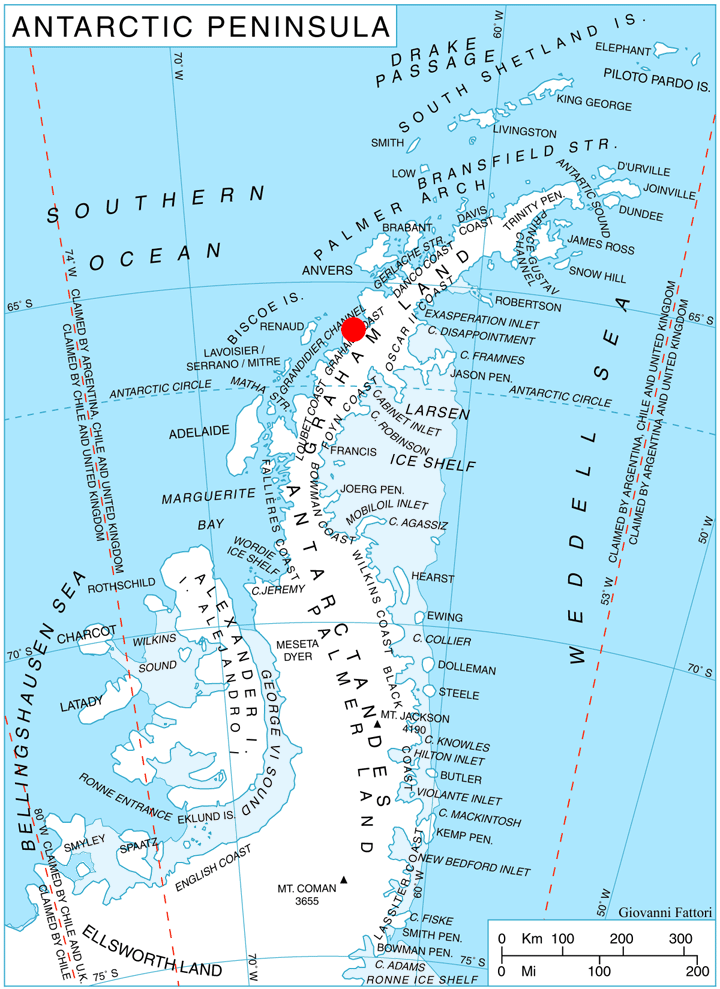
Location of Magnier Peninsula on Graham Coast, Antarctic Peninsula.

Magnier Peninsula is the mostly ice-covered peninsula projecting 18 km in northwest direction from Graham Coast in Graham Land, Antarctica. It is 17 km wide between Leroux Bay to the northeast and Bigo Bay to the southwest. Magnier Peaks rise in the northern part of the peninsula, while Lisiya Ridge occupy its base.

The peninsula is named by Chile, taking its name from Magnier Peaks.

== Location ==
Magnier Peninsula is centred at 65°42′00″S 64°18′00″W. British mapping in 1971.

== Maps ==
- British Antarctic Territory. Scale 1:200000 topographic map. DOS 610 Series, Sheet W 65 64. Directorate of Overseas Surveys, Tolworth, UK, 1971.
