= Graham Coast =

Coast in Graham Land, Antarctica

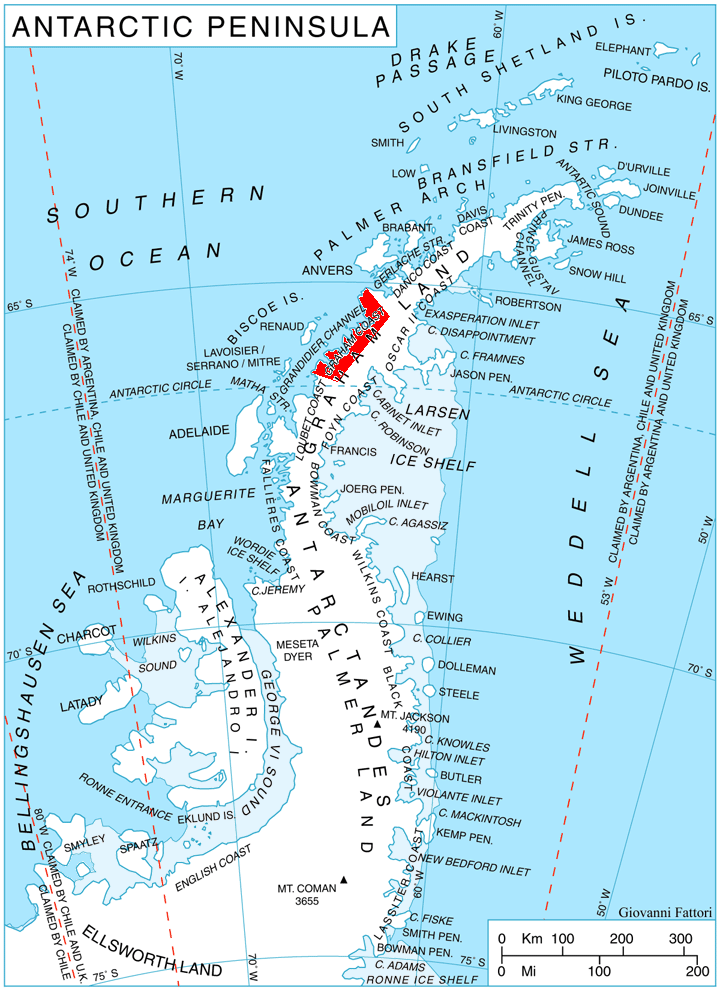
Location of Graham Coast on the Antarctic Peninsula.

Graham Coast is the portion of the west coast of Graham Land in Antarctic Peninsula, extending 172 km between Cape Bellue to the southwest and Cape Renard to the northeast.

The coast is named after Sir James Graham, First Lord of the Admiralty during the early exploration of the area by John Biscoe.

== Location ==
Graham Coast is centred at 65°45′S 64°00′W. British mapping in 1971–76.

== Maps ==
- British Antarctic Territory. Scale 1:200000 topographic map. DOS 610 Series, Sheet W 65 64. Directorate of Overseas Surveys, Tolworth, UK, 1971.
- British Antarctic Territory. Scale 1:200000 topographic map. DOS 610 Series, Sheet W 65 62. Directorate of Overseas Surveys, Tolworth, UK, 1976.
- British Antarctic Territory. Scale 1:200000 topographic map. DOS 610 Series, Sheet W 66 64. Directorate of Overseas Surveys, Tolworth, UK, 1976.
