= Vineh Peak =

Rocky peak in the South Shetland Islands, Antarctica

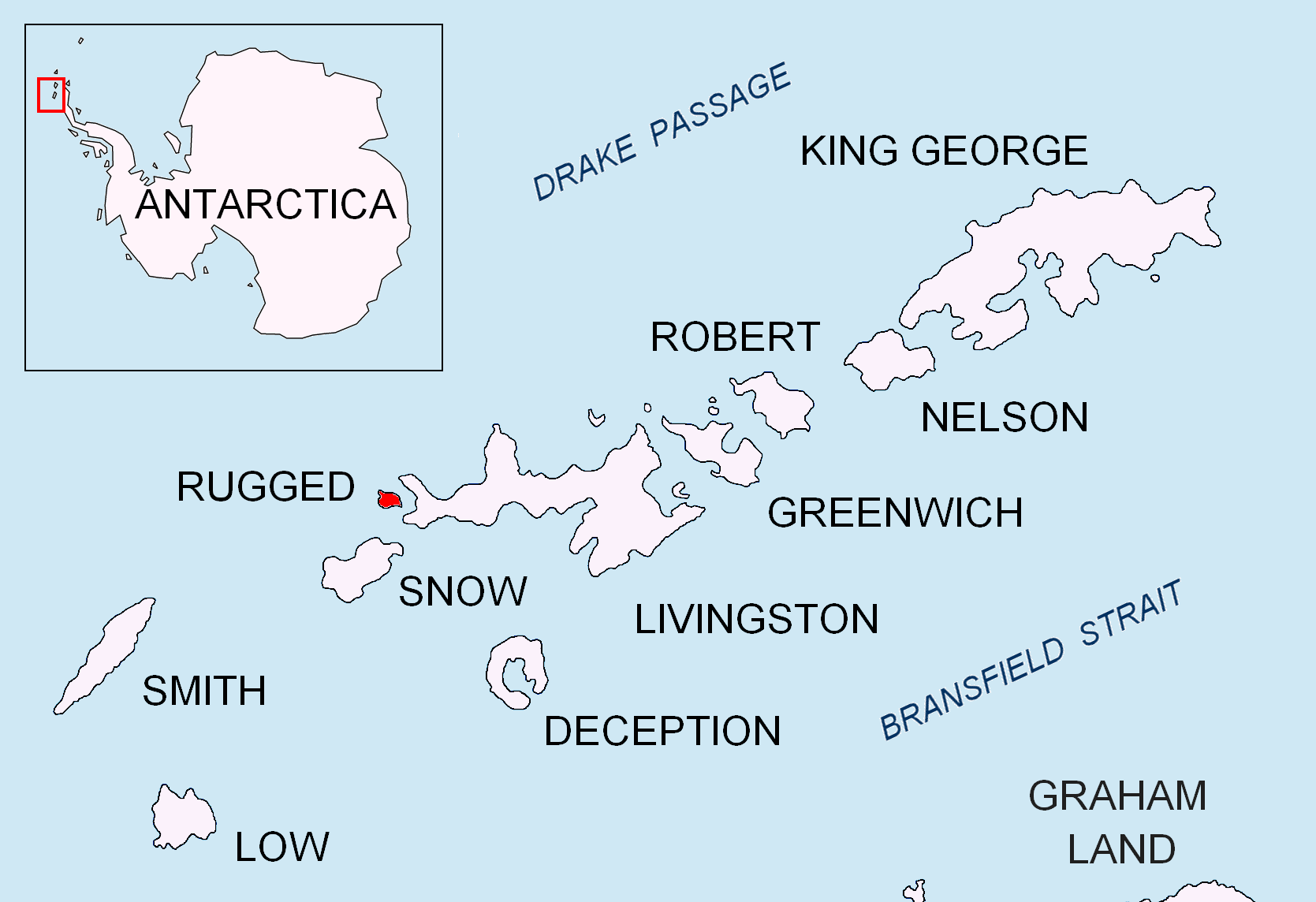
Location of Rugged Island in the South Shetland Islands

Topographic map of Livingston Island

Vineh Peak (Bulgarian: връх Винех, romanized: vrah Vineh, IPA: [ˈvrɤɣ viˈnɛx]) is a rocky peak rising to 186 m in the east extremity of Rugged Island off the west coast of Byers Peninsula of Livingston Island in the South Shetland Islands, Antarctica.

The peak is named after Khan Vineh of Bulgaria, 756-760 AD.

== Location ==
Vineh Peak is located at 62°37′53.8″S 61°12′00″W which is 680 m east of the highest point of Bakshev Ridge, 930 m south-southeast of Herring Point, 970 m north of Radev Point, and 580 m west of Vund Point (Spanish mapping in 1992 and Bulgarian in 2009).

== Maps ==
- Península Byers, Isla Livingston. Mapa topográfico a escala 1:25000. Madrid: Servicio Geográfico del Ejército, 1992.
- L.L. Ivanov. Antarctica: Livingston Island and Greenwich, Robert, Snow and Smith Islands. Scale 1:120000 topographic map. Troyan: Manfred Wörner Foundation, 2009. ISBN 978-954-92032-6-4
- L.L. Ivanov. Antarctica: Livingston Island and Smith Island. Scale 1:100000 topographic map. Manfred Wörner Foundation, 2017. ISBN 978-619-90008-3-0
