= Bakshev Ridge =

Rugged rocky ridge on Rugged Island in the South Shetland Islands, Antarctica

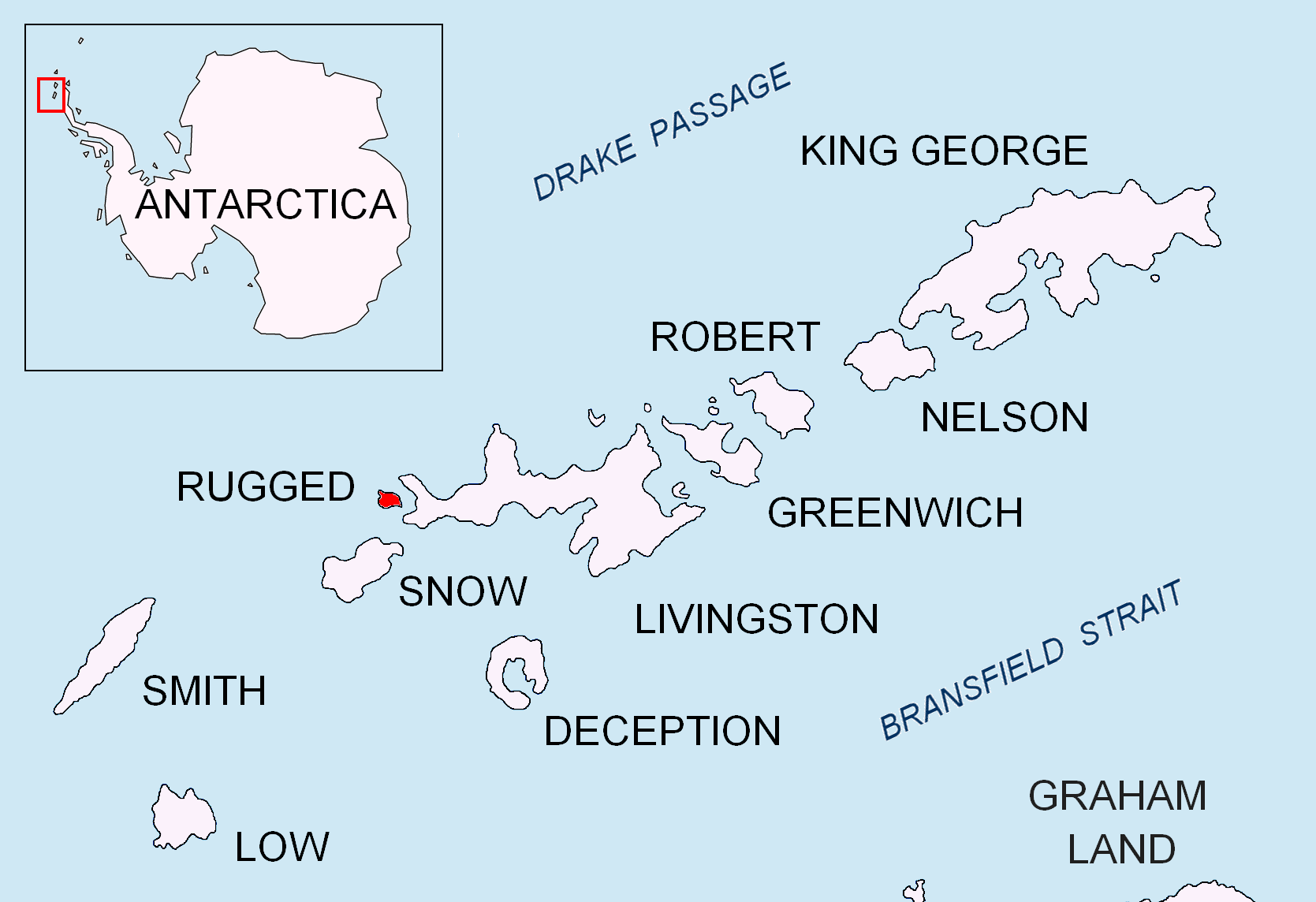
Location of Rugged Island in the South Shetland Islands.

Topographic map of Livingston Island and Smith Island

Bakshev Ridge (Bulgarian: Бакшев рид, ‘Bakshev Rid’ \'bak-shev 'rid\) is a rugged rocky ridge on Rugged Island, off the west coast of Byers Peninsula of Livingston Island in the South Shetland Islands, Antarctica. The ridge extends 700 m in a southeast-northwest direction. The highest point of elevation is 239 m, situated 660 m east of San Stefano Peak, 1.25 km west of Vund Point, and 1.1 km northwest of Radev Point.

The ridge is named after Petar Bogdan Bakshev (1601–1674), Catholic Archbishop of Sofia, and author of an early Bulgarian historiography published in 1667.

== Location ==
Bakshev Ridge is located at 62°37′55″S 61°12′48″W. Spanish mapping in 1992 and Bulgarian in 2009.

== Maps ==
- Península Byers, Isla Livingston. Mapa topográfico a escala 1:25000. Madrid: Servicio Geográfico del Ejército, 1992.
- L.L. Ivanov et al. Antarctica: Livingston Island and Greenwich Island, South Shetland Islands. Scale 1:100000 topographic map. Sofia: Antarctic Place-names Commission of Bulgaria, 2005.
- L.L. Ivanov. Antarctica: Livingston Island and Greenwich, Robert, Snow and Smith Islands. Scale 1:120000 topographic map. Troyan: Manfred Wörner Foundation, 2010. ISBN 978-954-92032-9-5 (First edition 2009. ISBN 978-954-92032-6-4)
- South Shetland Islands: Livingston Island, Byers Peninsula. Scale 1:50000 satellite map. UK Antarctic Place-names Committee, 2010.
- Antarctic Digital Database (ADD). Scale 1:250000 topographic map of Antarctica. Scientific Committee on Antarctic Research (SCAR). Since 1993, regularly updated.
- L.L. Ivanov. Antarctica: Livingston Island and Smith Island. Scale 1:100000 topographic map. Manfred Wörner Foundation, 2017. ISBN 978-619-90008-3-0
