= Cherven Peak =

Rocky peak in the South Shetland Islands, Antarctica

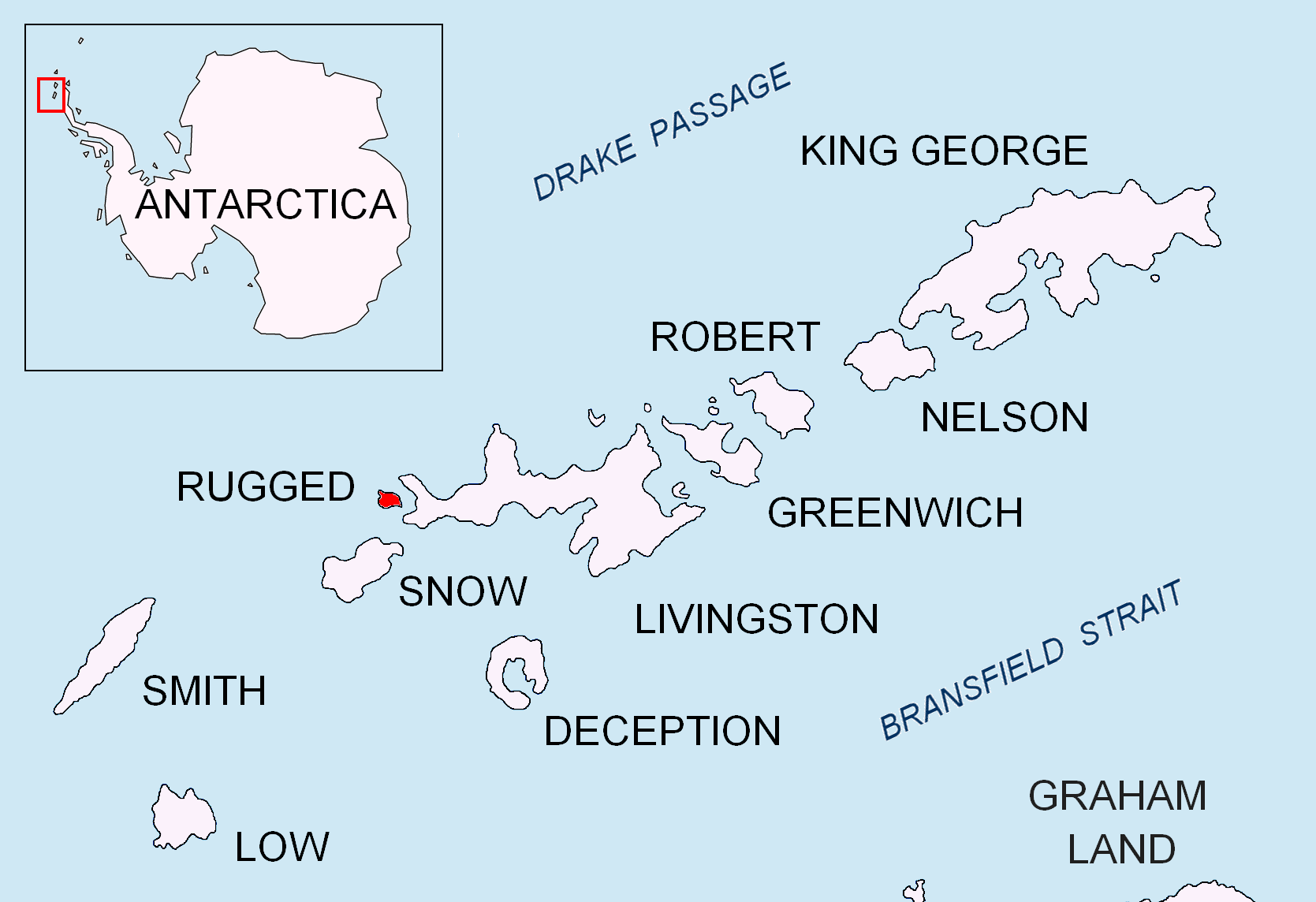
Location of Rugged Island in the South Shetland Islands

Topographic map of Livingston Island, Greenwich, Robert, Snow and Smith Islands

Cherven Peak (Bulgarian: връх Червен, romanized: vrah Cherven, IPA: [ˈvrɤx ˈt͡ʃɛrvɛn]) is a rocky peak rising to 224 m on the north coast of Rugged Island off the west coast of Byers Peninsula of Livingston Island in the South Shetland Islands, Antarctica. Situated 1.04 km west of Herring Point, 830 m north of San Stefano Peak, 3.9 km east-southeast of Cape Sheffield, and 700 m southeast of Ivan Vladislav Point formed by an offshoot of the peak.

The peak is named after the medieval town of Cherven in northeastern Bulgaria.

== Location ==
Cherven Peak is located at 62°37′26.6″S 61°13′30.4″W. Spanish mapping in 1993 and Bulgarian in 2009.

== Maps ==
- Península Byers, Isla Livingston. Mapa topográfico a escala 1:25000. Madrid: Servicio Geográfico del Ejército, 1992.
- L.L. Ivanov. Antarctica: Livingston Island and Greenwich, Robert, Snow and Smith Islands. Scale 1:120000 topographic map. Troyan: Manfred Wörner Foundation, 2009. ISBN 978-954-92032-6-4
