= Pindarev Island =

Antarctic island

- Location within South Shetland Islands Location within Antarctica

Geography
- Location: Antarctica
- Coordinates: 62°36′57.6″S 61°17′07″W
- Archipelago: South Shetland Islands
- Area: 1.9 ha (4.7 acres)
- Length: 250 m (820 ft)
- Width: 115 m (377 ft)

Administration
- Administered under the Antarctic Treaty System

Demographics
- Population: uninhabited

Pindarev Island (Bulgarian: Пиндарев остров, romanized: Pindarev ostrov, IPA: [pinˈdarɛf ˈɔstrof]) is an island in Antarctica. It is 250 metres (820 ft) long in southeast-northwest direction and 115 metres (377 ft) wide flat rocky island in Nishava Cove, separated from the north coast of Rugged Island in the South Shetland Islands by a 35 metres (115 ft) wide passage. Its surface area is 1.9 hectares (4.7 acres). The area was visited by early 19th century sealers.

The feature is named after the Bulgarian cartoonist Tenyu Pindarev (1921–2010), for his contribution to the promotion of Antarctica.

== Location ==
Pindarev Island is located at 62°36′57.6″S 61°17′07″W, which is 590 metres (1,940 ft) east-southeast of Cape Sheffield and 950 metres (3,120 ft) west of Chiprovtsi Point. Detailed mapping was done by the Spanish in 1992, and Bulgarian mapping in 2009 and 2017.

== Maps ==
- Península Byers, Isla Livingston. Mapa topográfico a escala 1:25000. Madrid: Servicio Geográfico del Ejército, 1992
- L. Ivanov. Antarctica: Livingston Island and Greenwich, Robert, Snow and Smith Islands. Scale 1:120000 topographic map. Troyan: Manfred Wörner Foundation, 2010. ISBN 978-954-92032-9-5 (First edition 2009. ISBN 978-954-92032-6-4)
- L. Ivanov. Antarctica: Livingston Island and Smith Island. Scale 1:100000 topographic map. Manfred Wörner Foundation, 2017. ISBN 978-619-90008-3-0
- Antarctic Digital Database (ADD). Scale 1:250000 topographic map of Antarctica. Scientific Committee on Antarctic Research (SCAR). Since 1993, regularly upgraded and updated

== See also ==
- List of Antarctic and subantarctic islands
