= Ivan Vladislav Point =

Point in the South Shetland Islands, Antarctica

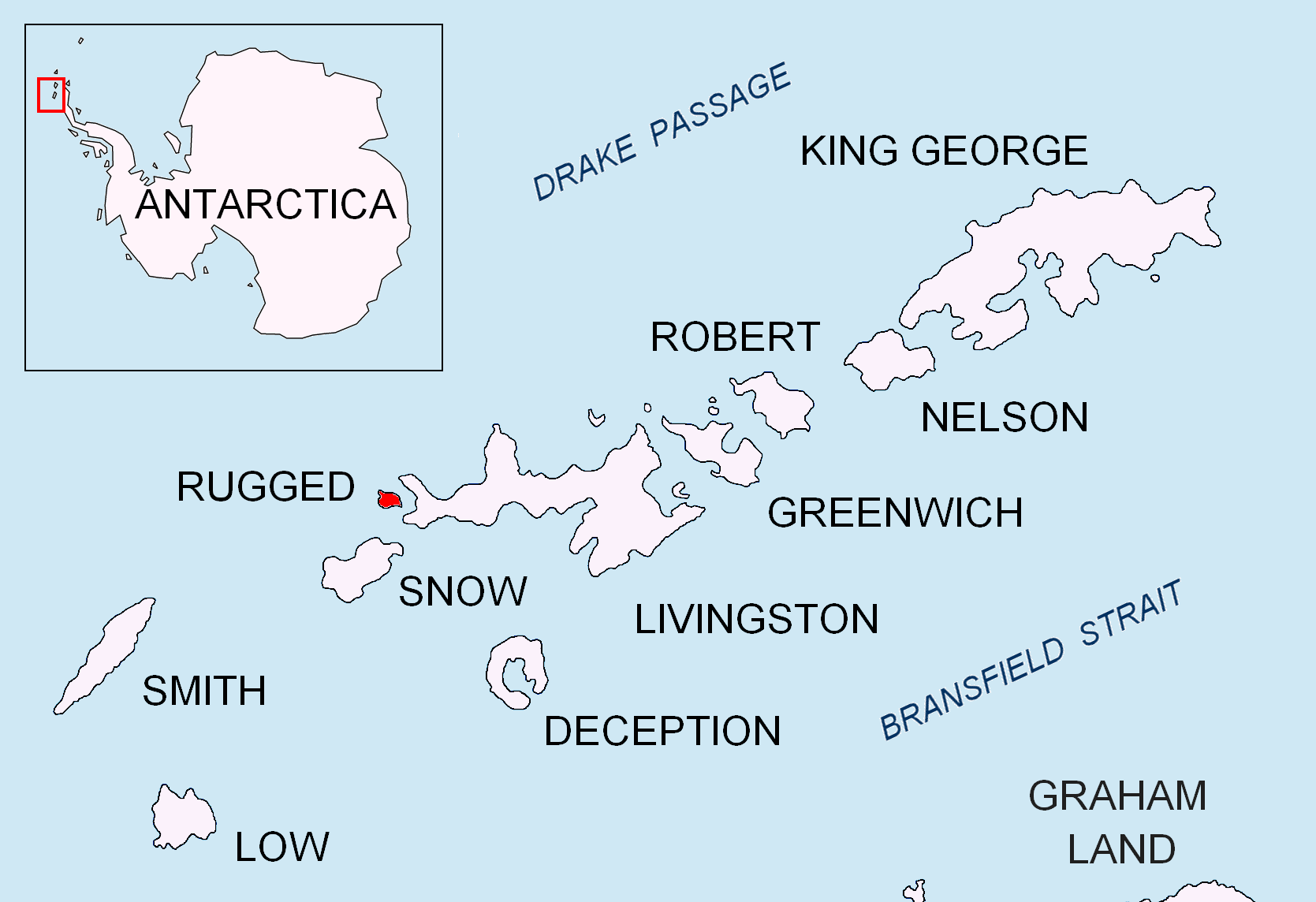
Location of Rugged Island in the South Shetland Islands.

Topographic map of Livingston Island.

Ivan Vladislav Point (Bulgarian: нос Иван Владислав, ‘Nos Ivan Vladislav’ \'nos i-'van vla-di-'slav\) is a point on the north coast of Rugged Island off the west coast of Byers Peninsula of Livingston Island in the South Shetland Islands, Antarctica formed by an offshoot of Cherven Peak. Situated 1.63 km west-northwest of Herring Point, 400 m east-northeast of Simitli Point, and 3.27 km east-southeast of Cape Sheffield.

The point is named after Czar Ivan Vladislav of Bulgaria, 1015-1018 AD.

== Location ==
Ivan Vladislav Point is located at 62°37′07.2″S 61°14′05.8″W. British mapping in 1968, Spanish in 1993 and Bulgarian in 2009.

== Maps ==
- Península Byers, Isla Livingston. Mapa topográfico a escala 1:25000. Madrid: Servicio Geográfico del Ejército, 1992.
- L.L. Ivanov. Antarctica: Livingston Island and Greenwich, Robert, Snow and Smith Islands. Scale 1:120000 topographic map. Troyan: Manfred Wörner Foundation, 2009. ISBN 978-954-92032-6-4
- Antarctic Digital Database (ADD). Scale 1:250000 topographic map of Antarctica. Scientific Committee on Antarctic Research (SCAR). Since 1993, regularly upgraded and updated.
- L.L. Ivanov. Antarctica: Livingston Island and Smith Island. Scale 1:100000 topographic map. Manfred Wörner Foundation, 2017. ISBN 978-619-90008-3-0
