= The Pointers =

Rocks in the South Shetland Islands, Antarctica

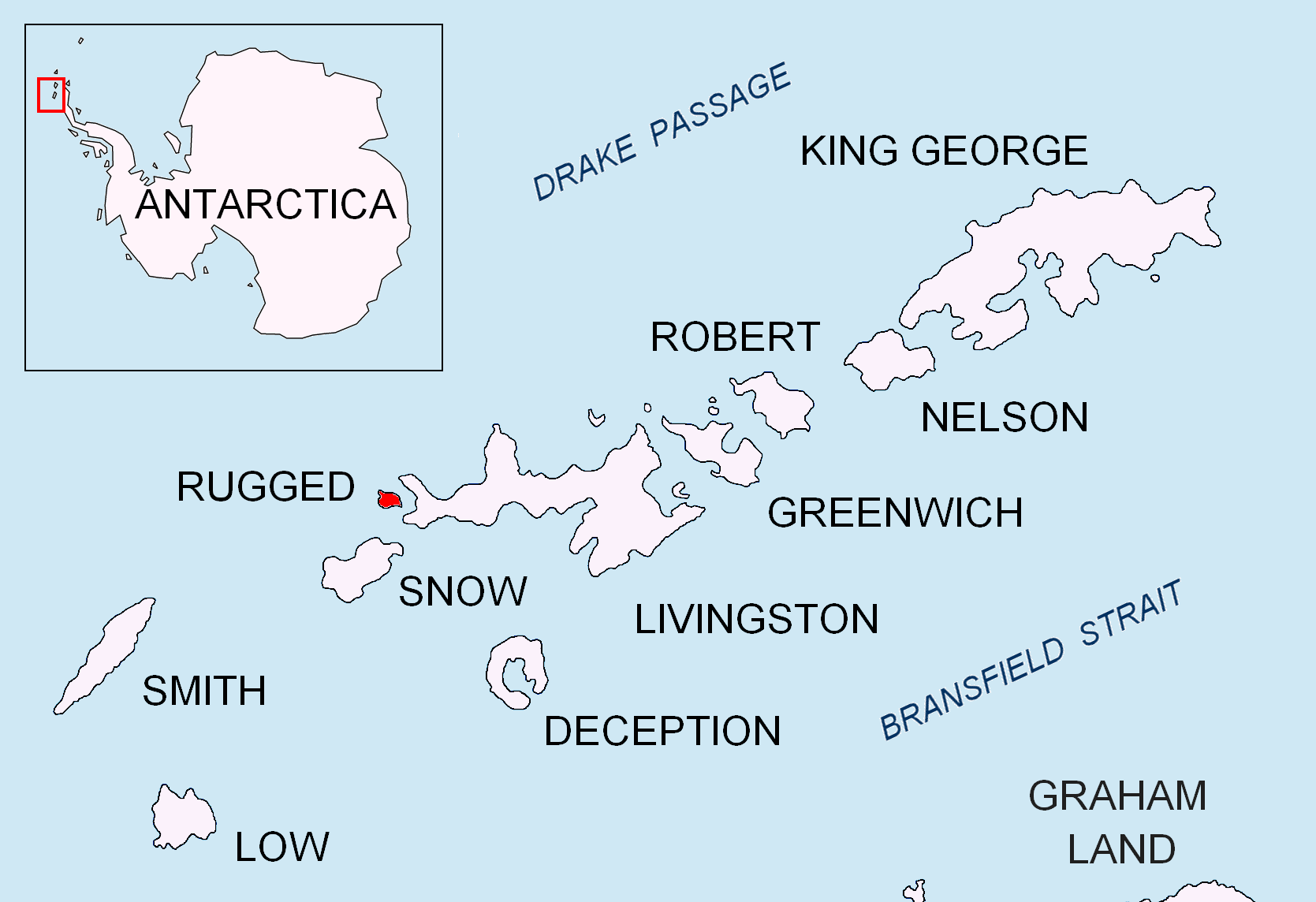
- Location of Rugged Island in the South Shetland Islands

- Location on Antarctic Peninsula Location in Antarctica

Geography
- Location: Antarctica
- Coordinates: 62°35′21.1″S 61°19′15.3″W
- Archipelago: South Shetland Islands

Administration
- Antarctica
- Administered under the Antarctic Treaty System

Demographics
- Population: uninhabited

The Pointers is a pair of rocks off the northwest coast of Rugged Island, lying between Eddystone Rocks and Start Point, Livingston Island in the South Shetland Islands, Antarctica.

The rocks were known to 19th century sealers who named them descriptively as a navigational mark and hazard near the entrance to New Plymouth harbour.

== Location ==
The rocks are centred at 62°35′21.1″S 61°19′15.3″W which is 5.39 km (3.35 mi) west of Start Point, Livingston Island, 2.92 km (1.81 mi) north-northwest of Cape Sheffield and 3.54 km (2.20 mi) east-northeast of Eddystone Rocks (British mapping in 1968, Chilean in 1971, Argentine in 1980, and Bulgarian in 2009).

Topographic map of Livingston Island, Greenwich, Robert, Snow and Smith Islands

== See also ==
- List of Antarctic islands south of 60° S
