= Radev =

Radev (Bulgarian: Радев) may refer to:

- Radev (surname)
- Radev Point in Antarctica
- The Radev Collection of artworks in London, UK
