= San Stefano Peak =

Rocky peak on the South Shetland Islands, Antarctica

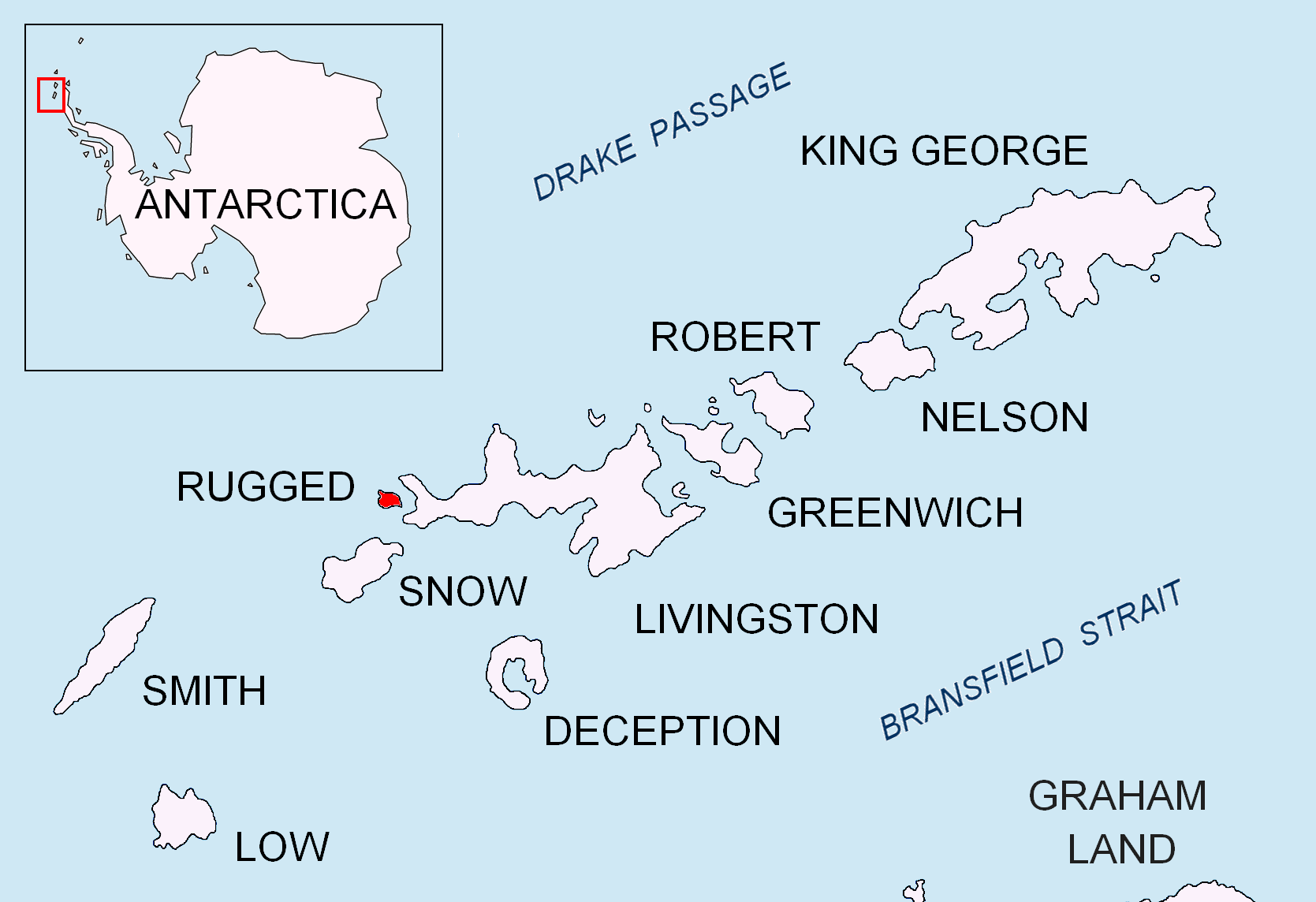
Location of Rugged Island in the South Shetland Islands.

Topographic map of Livingston Island

San Stefano Peak (Bulgarian: връх Сан Стефано, romanized: vrah San Stefano, IPA: [ˈvrɤx sɐn stɛˈfano]) is a rocky peak rising to 256 m, the summit of Rugged Island off the west coast of Byers Peninsula of Livingston Island in the South Shetland Islands, Antarctica. Situated in the central part of the island, 3.48 km northeast of Benson Point, 4.17 km southeast of Cape Sheffield, 830 m south of Cherven Peak, 1.91 km west of Vund Point, and 1.58 km northwest of Radev Point.

The peak is "named after the settlement of San Stefano in connection with the homonymous Treaty that restored Bulgaria’s nationhood on 3 March 1878."

== Location ==
San Stefano Peak is located at 62°37′53.5″S 61°13′34″W. Spanish mapping in 1992 and Bulgarian in 2009.

== Maps ==
- Península Byers, Isla Livingston. Mapa topográfico a escala 1:25000. Madrid: Servicio Geográfico del Ejército, 1992.
- L.L. Ivanov et al. Antarctica: Livingston Island and Greenwich Island, South Shetland Islands. Scale 1:100000 topographic map. Sofia: Antarctic Place-names Commission of Bulgaria, 2005.
- L.L. Ivanov. Antarctica: Livingston Island and Greenwich, Robert, Snow and Smith Islands. Scale 1:120000 topographic map. Troyan: Manfred Wörner Foundation, 2010. ISBN 978-954-92032-9-5 (First edition 2009. ISBN 978-954-92032-6-4)
- South Shetland Islands: Livingston Island, Byers Peninsula. Scale 1:50000 satellite map. UK Antarctic Place-names Committee, 2010.
- Antarctic Digital Database (ADD). Scale 1:250000 topographic map of Antarctica. Scientific Committee on Antarctic Research (SCAR). Since 1993, regularly updated.
- L.L. Ivanov. Antarctica: Livingston Island and Smith Island. Scale 1:100000 topographic map. Manfred Wörner Foundation, 2017. ISBN 978-619-90008-3-0
