= Radev (surname) =

Radev (Bulgarian: Радев) is a Bulgarian masculine surname, its feminine counterpart is Radeva. It may refer to

- Aleksandar Radev (born 1960), Bulgarian boxer
- Boyan Radev (1942–2025), Greco-Roman wrestler from Bulgaria
- Chavdar Radev (born 1959), Bulgarian rower
- Desislava Radeva, Bulgarian public figure, wife of Rumen
- Dimitar Radev, Bulgarian economist
- Dragomir R. Radev, American professor of computer science
- Geno Radev (born 1946), Bulgarian gymnast
- Georgi Radev (born 1994), Bulgarian football defender
- Jordan Radev (born 1976), Bulgarian wrestler and mixed martial artist
- Muravey Radev (born 1947), Bulgarian politician
- Nik Radev (1959–2003), Bulgarian-born refugee in Australia
- Nikolay Radev (born 1996), Bulgarian football goalkeeper
- Petar Radev (born 1948), Bulgarian ice hockey goaltender
- Petia Radeva, Bulgarian-Spanish computer science professor
- Rumen Radev (born 1963), Bulgarian politician and President of Bulgaria
- Simeon Radev (1879–1967), Bulgarian writer, journalist, diplomat and historian
  - Radev Point in Antarctica
- Sonia Radeva (born 1985), Bulgarian figure skater
- Stoyan Radev, Bulgarian theatre and film director
- Táňa Radeva (1957–2025), Slovak actress
- Tsvetelin Radev (born 1988), Bulgarian football defender
- Vasil Radev (born 1961), Bulgarian rower
- Ventsislav Radev (born 1961), Bulgarian track and field athlete
- Viktor Radev (1936–2014), Bulgarian basketball player
- Vulo Radev (1923–2001), Bulgarian film director, writer, and cinematographer
