= Bekas Rock =

Rock in Antarctica

- Map of Livingston Island featuring Bekas Rock

- Location within Antarctica Location within Antarctic Peninsula

Geography
- Location: Antarctica
- Coordinates: 62°37′48″S 61°20′12″W
- Archipelago: South Shetland Islands
- Length: 140 m (460 ft)
- Width: 60 m (200 ft)

Administration
- Antarctica
- Administered under the Antarctic Treaty System

Demographics
- Population: uninhabited

Bekas Rock (Bulgarian: скала Бекас, ‘Skala Bekas’ \ska-'la be-'kas\) is the 140 m long in southwest-northeast direction and 60 m wide rock lying west of Rugged Island on the west side of Livingston Island in the South Shetland Islands, Antarctica. The area was visited by early 19th century sealers.

The rock is “named after the ocean fishing trawler Bekas of the Bulgarian company Ocean Fisheries – Burgas whose ships operated in the waters of South Georgia, Kerguelen, the South Orkney Islands, South Shetland Islands and Antarctic Peninsula from 1970 to the early 1990s. The Bulgarian fishermen, along with those of the Soviet Union, Poland and East Germany are the pioneers of modern Antarctic fishing industry.”

== Location ==
Bekas Rock is located at 62°37′48″S 61°20′12″W, which is 2.63 km southwest of Cape Sheffield, 1.95 km west by south of Ugain Point, 2.73 km northwest of Benson Point and 4.5 km southeast of the larger of the two Eddystone Rocks. Bulgarian mapping in 2017.

== Maps ==
- L.L. Ivanov. Antarctica: Livingston Island and Smith Island. Scale 1:100000 topographic map. Manfred Wörner Foundation, 2017; updated 2018.
- Antarctic Digital Database (ADD). Scale 1:250000 topographic map of Antarctica. Scientific Committee on Antarctic Research (SCAR). Since 1993, regularly upgraded and updated.
