= Chiprovtsi Point =

Geographical point

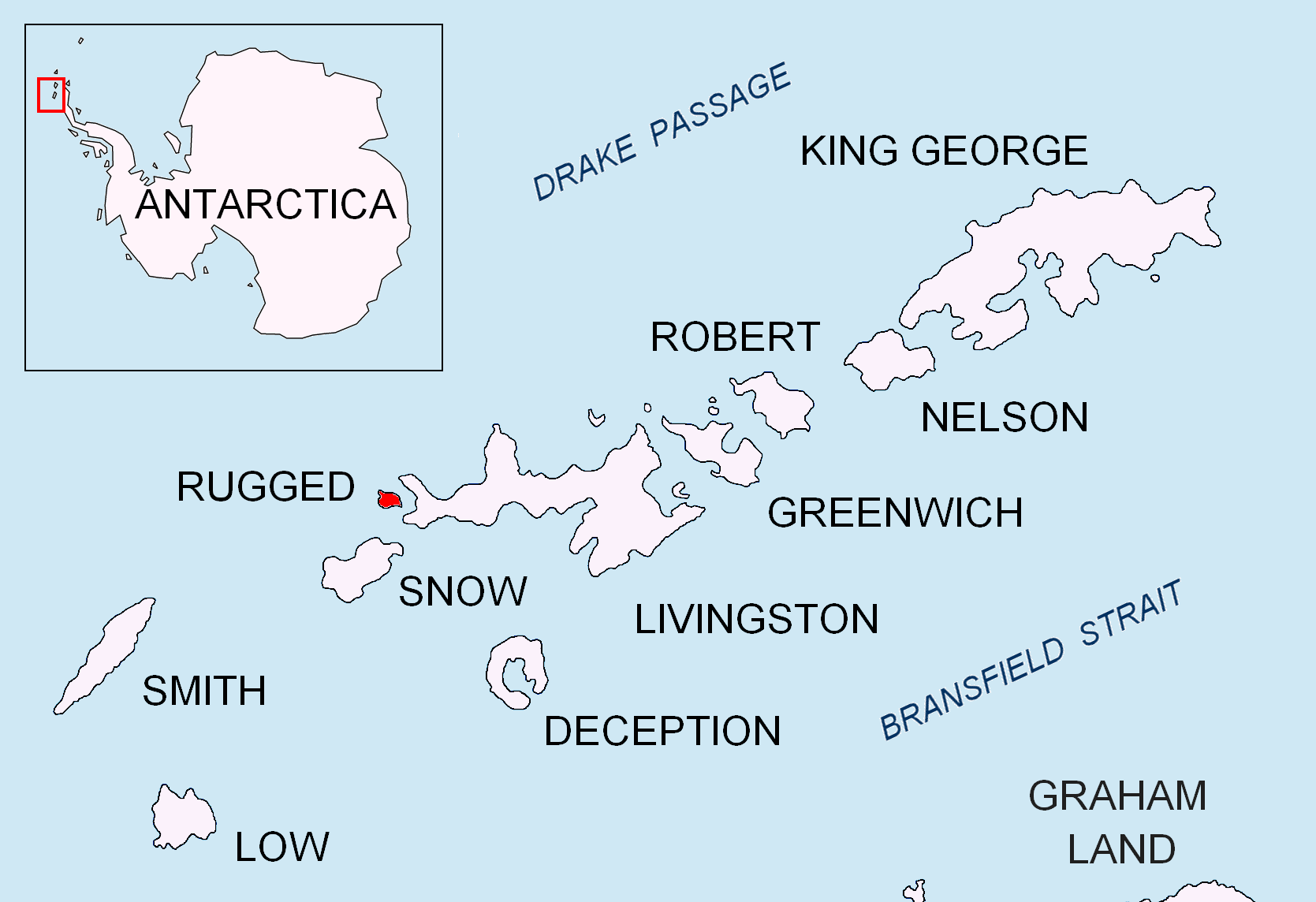
- Location of Rugged Island in the South Shetland Islands.

- Location within Antarctica Location within Antarctic Peninsula

Geography
- Location: Antarctica
- Coordinates: 62°37′01.3″S 61°15′52.3″W
- Archipelago: South Shetland Islands
- Length: 0.4 km (0.25 mi)

Administration
- Administered under the Antarctic Treaty System

Demographics
- Population: Uninhabited

Topographic map of Livingston Island and Smith Island

Chiprovtsi Point (Bulgarian: нос Чипровци, ‘Nos Chiprovtsi’ \'nos 'chi-prov-tsi\) is a point projecting 400 m (440 yd) northwestwards from the north coast of Rugged Island off the west coast of Byers Peninsula of Livingston Island in the South Shetland Islands, Antarctica, and forming the east side of the entrance to Nishava Cove. It is extended further 400 m (440 yd) northwestwards by the group of Chiprovtsi Islets, which are centred at 62°36′52″S 61°16′09″W and named in association with the point.

The point is named after the town of Chiprovtsi in northwestern Bulgaria.

== Location ==
Chiprovtsi Point is located at 62°37′01.3″S 61°15′52.3″W, which is 1.16 km (0.72 mi) west of Simitli Point, 1.75 km (1.09 mi) east-southeast of Cape Sheffield, and 3.9 km southwest of Start Point, Livingston Island. British mapping in 1968, Spanish in 1992 and Bulgarian in 2009.

== See also ==
- Composite Antarctic Gazetteer
- List of Antarctic islands south of 60° S
- SCAR
- Territorial claims in Antarctica

== Maps ==
- Península Byers, Isla Livingston. Mapa topográfico a escala 1:25000. Madrid: Servicio Geográfico del Ejército, 1992.
- L.L. Ivanov. Antarctica: Livingston Island and Greenwich, Robert, Snow and Smith Islands. Scale 1:120000 topographic map. Troyan: Manfred Wörner Foundation, 2009. ISBN 978-954-92032-6-4
