= Nishava Cove =

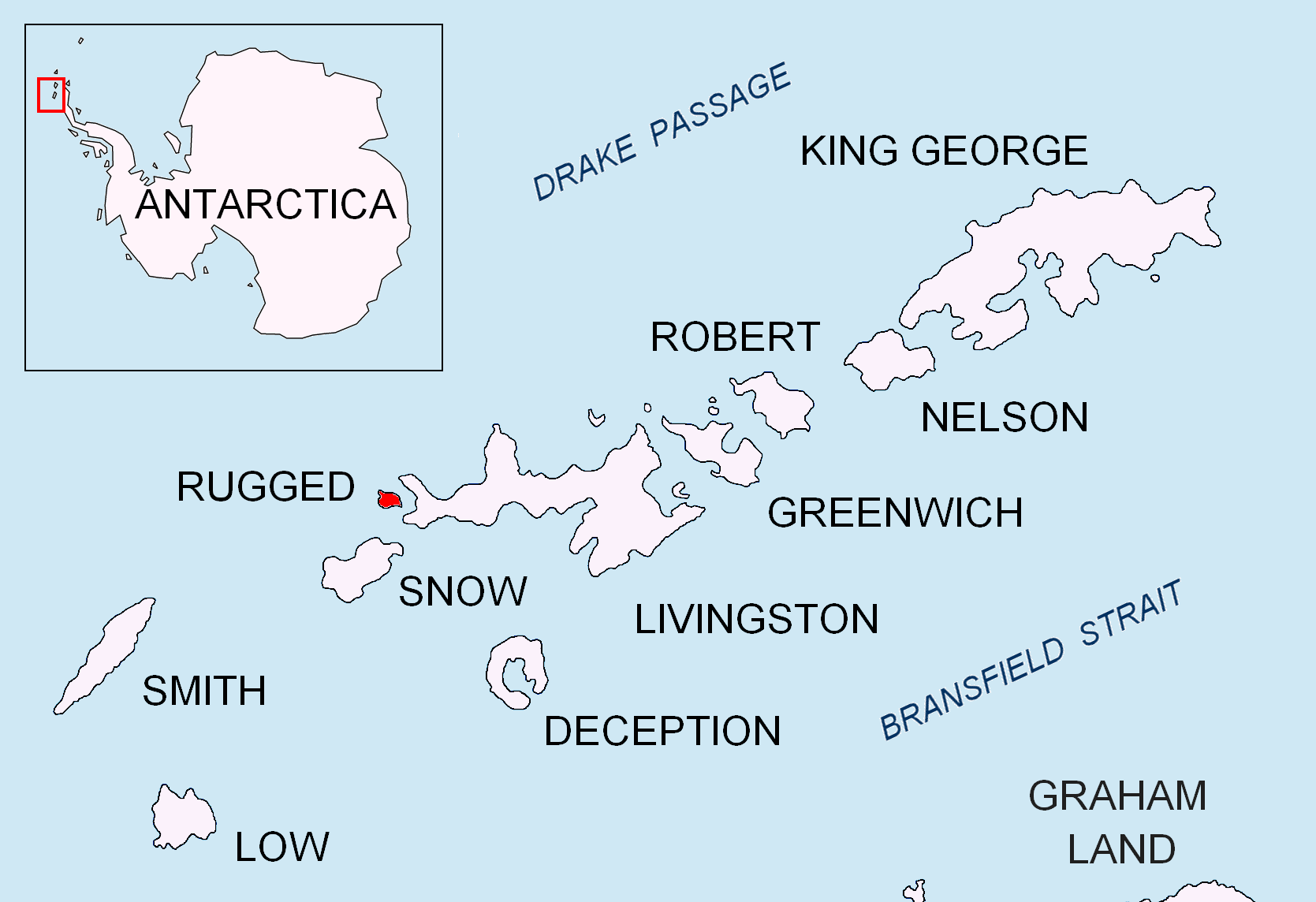
Location of Rugged Island in the South Shetland Islands.

Topographic map of Livingston Island.

Nishava Cove (Bulgarian/Serbian: залив Нишава, romanized: zaliv Nishava, IPA: [ˈzalif niˈʃavɐ]) is a 1.33 km wide cove indenting for 1 km the north coast of Rugged Island off the west coast of Byers Peninsula of Livingston Island in the South Shetland Islands, Antarctica. It is entered between Chiprovtsi Islets and Chiprovtsi Point on the east, and Cape Sheffield on the west. Pindarev Island lies in the western part of the cove.

The cove is named after Nishava River that originates in western Bulgaria and it flows to southeast Serbia.

== Location ==
Nishava Cove is located at 62°37′05″S 61°16′40″W. British mapping in 1968, Spanish in 1992 and Bulgarian in 2009.

== Maps ==
- Península Byers, Isla Livingston. Mapa topográfico a escala 1:25000. Madrid: Servicio Geográfico del Ejército, 1992.
- Antarctic Digital Database (ADD). Scale 1:250000 topographic map of Antarctica. Scientific Committee on Antarctic Research (SCAR). Since 1993, regularly upgraded and updated.
- L.L. Ivanov. Antarctica: Livingston Island and Greenwich, Robert, Snow and Smith Islands. Scale 1:120000 topographic map. Troyan: Manfred Wörner Foundation, 2009. ISBN 978-954-92032-6-4
