= Kianida Reef =

Antarctic reef

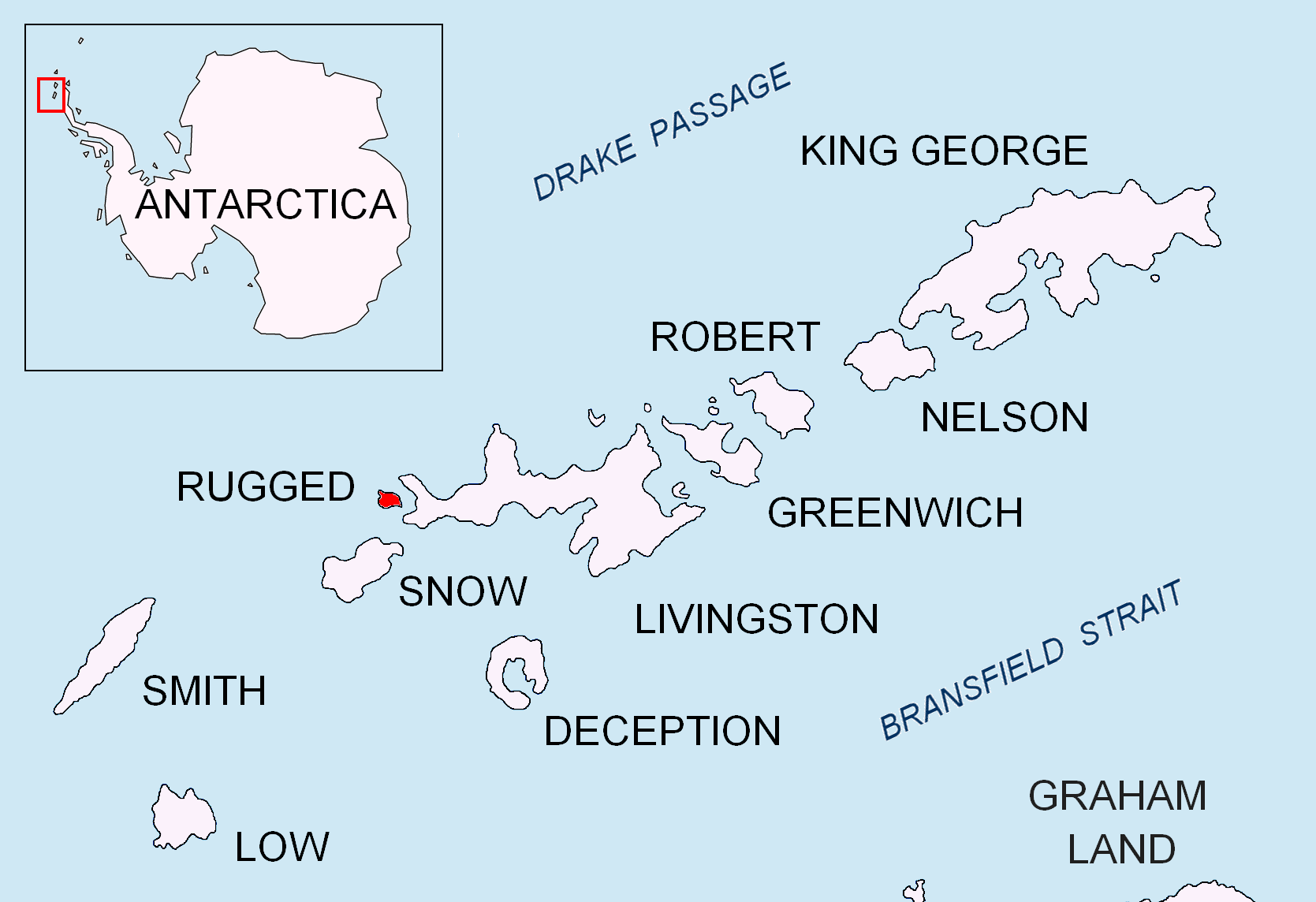
- Location of Rugged Island in the South Shetland Islands

- Location within Antarctica Location within South Shetland Islands

Geography
- Location: Antarctica
- Coordinates: 62°38′32″S 61°12′33″W
- Archipelago: South Shetland Islands
- Area: 4 ha (9.9 acres)
- Length: 350 m (1150 ft)
- Width: 140 m (460 ft)

Administration
- Administered under the Antarctic Treaty System

Demographics
- Population: uninhabited

Map of Byers Peninsula featuring Kianida Reef

Kianida Reef (Bulgarian: риф Кианида, romanized: rif Kianida, IPA: [ˈrif kiɐˈnidɐ]) is the 350 m long in east-west direction and 140 m wide, narrowing to the east rocky reef lying in Osogovo Bay, off the southeast extremity of Rugged Island in the South Shetland Islands. Its surface area is 4 ha. The area was visited by early 19th century sealers.

The feature is named after the phantom island of Kianida or Cianeis off the Black Sea coast of Thrace, featured on a 1467 map by Nicolaus Germanus based on Claudius Ptolemy's Geography.

== Location ==
Kianida Reef is located at 62°38′32″S 61°12′33″W, which is 440 m southwest of Radev Point, 1.65 km west-southwest of Astor Island and 3.5 km north-northwest of Devils Point on Livingston Island. Detailed Spanish mapping in 1992, and Bulgarian mapping in 2009 and 2017.

== Maps ==
- Península Byers, Isla Livingston. Mapa topográfico a escala 1:25000. Madrid: Servicio Geográfico del Ejército, 1992
- L. Ivanov. Antarctica: Livingston Island and Greenwich, Robert, Snow and Smith Islands. Scale 1:120000 topographic map. Troyan: Manfred Wörner Foundation, 2010. ISBN 978-954-92032-9-5 (First edition 2009. ISBN 978-954-92032-6-4)
- L. Ivanov. Antarctica: Livingston Island and Smith Island. Scale 1:100000 topographic map. Manfred Wörner Foundation, 2017. ISBN 978-619-90008-3-0
- Antarctic Digital Database (ADD). Scale 1:250000 topographic map of Antarctica. Scientific Committee on Antarctic Research (SCAR). Since 1993, regularly upgraded and updated

== See also ==
- List of Antarctic and subantarctic islands
