= Elisaveta Konsulova-Vazova =

Bulgarian artist (1881–1965)

- Born: Elisaveta Konsulova; 4 December 1881; Plovdiv, Eastern Rumelia
- Died: 29 August 1965 (aged 83); Sofia, People's Republic of Bulgaria
- Other names: Elizabeth Konsulova-Vazova
- Occupations: artist, art instructor
- Years active: 1902–1956

Elisaveta Georgieva Konsulova-Vazova (Bulgarian: Елисавета Георгиева Консулова-Вазова; 4 December 1881 – 29 August 1965) was one of the first women to become a professional artist in Bulgaria. She is credited with being the first Bulgarian woman to paint a nude figure at the State School of Painting and the first woman to host a solo exhibition in Bulgaria. With international study experience, she became a noted art critic, publishing articles focused on Bulgarian culture and women's participation in the arts.

== Early life ==
Elisaveta Konsulova was born on 4 December 1881 Plovdiv, in Eastern Rumelia of to Anna (née Hadjiyenova) and Georgi Konsulov. Her father was a merchant from Levski had in his early life been exiled to İzmir for political activities the 1860s, and supported the liberation of Bulgaria. After the establishment of the Principality of Bulgaria, he became a member of the Parliament. Her mother came from a well-to-do family of Tulcea. Konsulova was one of six children, including Nicholas, who would become governor of Gorna Dzhumaya; Stefan, who became a scientist; Elisaveta; Nedialka; Mara; and Karanfilais.

When Konsulova was ten years old, her family moved to Sofia, where her father became the director of a distillery. Encouraged by her father in 1897, Konsulova entered the State School of Painting, studying with Jaroslav Věšín. There were only two girls in her classes and they were often ridiculed. While the men studied anatomy on live models, the women are allowed only to sketch muscles and bones from modestly draped, plaster sculptures. Konsulova opposed the discriminatory teaching practices and went to the headmaster, Ivan Murvichka,. She asserted that women should be granted the same privilege as men to study and draw from nature. She then became the first woman at the school to both sketch nude models and paint nude portraits. During her schooling, she had a secret relationship for eight years with a young lieutenant Boris Vazov (bg), younger brother of Ivan Vazov. Her parents disapproved of his lack of status and they had to exchange letters through a classmate. Konsulova graduated in 1902, but her plans to study abroad were cut short by her father's death and her duty to financially support her family.

== Career ==
Konsulova began giving private painting lessons to students, like Bistra Vinarova, soon after her graduation. In the meantime, Boris had been sent to study in Paris and completed his doctorate in law. When he returned to Bulgaria, Konsulova's mother finally gave consent for their marriage. In 1906, the couple married and built a house on a plot of land given the couple by Boris' great-uncle. Konsulova-Vazova, having kept her maiden name, continued to paint in the studio built for her in their house at 11 August Street. Most of her works were portraits and still lifes done in the Impressionist style and quite a few of the portraits were of her brother-in-law, Ivan. She opened a girls' painting school on the top floor of the house, and in spite of having two daughters, Elka (born 1907) and Sabina (born 1909), known as Binka (bg), Konsulova-Vazova still dreamed of continuing her studies.

At the encouragement of her mother-in-law, Saba Vazova, in 1909, Konsulova-Vazova and her two daughters moved to Munich to attend classes at the Munich Academy of Fine Arts in the women's department. Boris remained in Sofia, and Konsulova-Vazova enrolled in classes under the tutelage of professor Henryk Knir. Her two most noted pieces from this time were Ladies in White and Portrait in White. After graduating from her courses, Konsulova-Vazova returned to Sofia and gave birth to her third daughter, Ana in 1911. Continuing her work, she created many portraits during this time. Most of them were painted outdoors and she worked in a variety of media, including oils, pastels and watercolors. She was also well known for her realistic flower paintings and still lifes. In 1911, she participated in an exhibition in Prague "Bulgarian Woman" and presented works she had created over the previous four years. In 1912, she exhibited in the show of the "Lada" Union of South Slavic Artists with her piece Ladies in White.

During the First Balkan War, Konsulova-Vazova became a Red Cross volunteer, nursing cholera patients in Lozengrad and Yambol after the First Battle of Çatalca. She was awarded the Grand Cross in recognition for her Red Cross work after the war and returned to her painting. In 1919 in a Sofia event, she became the first professional woman artist in Bulgaria to hold a solo exhibit. Selling all of the works from the show, she was inspired to found a "Native Art" company in which she gave lessons on plein air painting. Some of her most noted works from this period were portraits of cultural figures, including: Portrait of the Writer Stoyan Mihaylovski (1918), Portrait of Dobri Hristov (1919), Portrait of a Boy (1920), Portrait of Ivan Vazov (1920), Portrait of Aleksandar Bozhinov (1925), among others.

The 1920s ushered in a decade of artistic expansion in Bulgaria and intellectuals flourished. Konsulova-Vazova and Elena Karamihaylova came into their own during the period as noted Impressionists. At the beginning of the decade, she spent another extended period studying in Germany between 1920 and 1922. Konsulova-Vazova began publishing articles evaluating trends in contemporary art, finding most of the avant-garde movements like Abstract, Cubism, Dadism, to be confused and expressed that they represented a "hatred for the values of the past". In 1923, the family moved to a two-story house on Han Krum Street in Sofia and Boris began working in politics. Konsulova-Vazova was one of the founders of the "Slavia Beseda" Native Art Association, which included Karamihaylova, Konstantin Shtarkelov, Syrak Skitnik, and others. The Association hosted evenings where participants shared tea, told folk tales, sang folk tunes, and created traditional handicrafts. This gave them the idea of creating a Bulgarian puppet theater, transforming the European art form into a national cultural staple. Up to that time, the only open air theater popular in Bulgaria was the Turkish folkloric theater art of Orta Oyunu, which combined farcical improvisation and various props in their plays. The group incorporated some of the Turkish traditions in their Bulgarian theater, with women sewing the native costumes and architect Atanas Donkov, carving the puppets.

In 1927, Boris was appointed as the Bulgarian Plenipotentiary Minister, and the family relocated to Prague, where they would live for the next six years. Konsulova-Vazova participated in a variety of cultural projects, such as the Czechoslovak-Bulgarian Reciprocity Association, created the first boarding house for Bulgarian students in Prague, was the only Bulgarian to participate in the 1929 Congress of the International Union of Puppet Actors and that same year, presented a paper on Bulgarian traditional costumes at the International Congress of Folk Arts held in Prague. In 1930, she participated in the Bulgarian Folk Art Exhibition at the National Technical Museum. Upon her return to Sofia in 1934, Konsulova-Vazova began writing for Beseda (Debate), a women's cultural magazine published until 1940, which focused on evaluating women's place in society, their role in family, and the role of women artists. Within the pages of the magazine, she translated articles from English, French and German to expound on issues of the day. She wrote about women's political involvement, innovations in hygiene and nutrition, parenting, equal access to education, and critical evaluations of art and culture. Included in the journal were critical analysis and reproductions of each exhibition held by the Bulgarian Association of Women Artists and some foreign exhibitions, including the Association of Czech Artists of Sofia).

In 1934 and again in 1935, Konsulova-Vazova showed artworks in Sofia exhibits and in 1937 was awarded the medal "For encouragement to Humanity" in the second degree. The following year she co-organized the Commonwealth Artisan-crafts Exhibition held in May and then in the summer went to Prague to organize an exhibit on Bulgarian art for the National Ethnographic Museum. She continued publishing Beseda, but also published translations of short stories and critiques in other journals and newspapers, including: Artist magazine, Day, Mir (bg), Slovo, and Zora (bg), among others. She translated works by authors such as Marie von Ebner-Eschenbach, Knut Hamsen, Jerome K. Jerome, Sinclair Lewis, Axel Munthe, Richard Muther, Theodor Storm, and many others. In 1939, Konsulova-Vazova founded the company, Bulgarian Home (Bulgarian: Български дом which operated until 1945. The purpose of the company was to train women in successful home management, including teaching budgeting, sanitation, and home maintenance.

After the Bulgarian coup d'état of 1944, all artistic associations in the country were suspended and many intellectuals and artists left the country. Though Boris had served six terms in the National Assembly, his pension was terminated. Konsulova-Vazova turned to translating fairy tales to support them. In 1948, she joined the Union of Bulgarian Artists. Though mostly living a quiet existence in this period, in 1956, she held a jubilee exhibition of her works.

== Death and legacy ==
Konsulova-Vazova died on 29 August 1965 in Sofia, which at that time was in the People's Republic of Bulgaria. Numerous posthumous exhibitions of her work have been shown throughout the world in places as far flung as Paris, Prague, São Paulo, and Warsaw. In 2004, she was a featured artist at the Bulgarian National Art Gallery.
