= Bistra Vinarova =

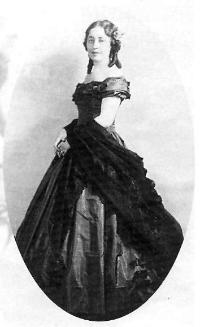
- taken at a reception during their diplomatic term in Washington, D. C.
- Born: 6 November 1890; Sofia in the Principality of Bulgaria of the Ottoman Empire
- Died: 15 April 1977 (aged 86); Sofia, People's Republic of Bulgaria
- Occupation: artist
- Years active: 1915–1963
- Known for: first Bulgarian woman of the expressionist school

Bistra Vinarova (Bulgarian: Бистра Винарова; 6 November 1890 – 15 April 1977) was a Bulgarian artist and often credited as the first Bulgarian woman of the expressionist style. Trained in Bulgaria, Germany, and later Austria, she had wide acquaintance among the avant-garde literary and artistic figures in the early part of the twentieth century. Married to a diplomat, her career was interrupted by travel and hostess duties. After her return to Bulgaria in 1940, she resumed painting. For a period of time, she and her husband were both ostracized by the political regime, but late in life, she was honored with several national honors for her artistic works.

== Early life ==
Bistra Vinarova, known as Nona, was born on 6 November 1890 in Sofia, which at the time was in the Principality of Bulgaria of the Ottoman Empire. Her parents were Elsa (née Valkovicha) and General Varban Vinarov (bg). Her maternal grandfather, Georgi Valkovich was a noted surgeon and her maternal great-grandfather was Valko Kurtovic Chalakov (Bulgarian: Вълко Куртович Чалъков), a member of the Chalakov family (bg), who had been benefactors of the city of Plovdiv since the National Revival, building hospitals and churches in the city. Growing up in Sofia, Vinarova studied with the noted painter Elisaveta Konsulova-Vazova, who would later graduate from the Munich Academy of Fine Arts. In 1906, the family relocated to Vienna, where her father died two years later. In 1910, Vinarova met her future husband, Simeon Radev, when he came to interview her mother, as General Vinarov's widow, for a book he was preparing Builders of Modern Bulgaria.

In 1911, Vinarova moved to Dresden, to continue her studies with Ferdinand Dorsch. She became part of the German expressionist group known as Die Brücke and participated in their exhibitions. After five years of study she moved to Munich and began studying with Hans Hofmann, where she remained until 1918. Vinarova became noted among the European avant-garde Expressionist circle which included artists like Otto Dix, Conrad Felixmüller, Oskar Kokoschka and Bulgarian artists Bencho Obreshkov and George Papazov, among others. She was a correspondent of Rainer Maria Rilke, whom she had met by chance at a Rodin exhibit. The two struck up a friendship and Rilke dedicated several poems to her. Returning to Vienna, she studied at the Vienna Women's Academy, specializing in graphics arts.

== Career ==
Vinarova began exhibiting her works in 1915, and participated in numerous exhibits. She created works in a variety of media including oils and watercolor as well as genres including expressionist painting, graphic art, sketching, and woodcutting. She was one of the first expressionist Bulgarian painters, and the first known woman painting in the style. In 1922, she held a successful solo exhibition in Vienna, which was reviewed by Nikos Kazantzakis praising her talent. Kazantzakis, who wrote Zorba the Greek was enamored of Vinarova and at one point even proposed to her, though she refused. The following year, after a thirteen year courtship, Vinarova and Radev married in Constantinople.

Most of Vinarova's works show a modern method of expression and smooth color transitions between her color combinations, which often centered around a palette of grays, greens and reds. Her works were noted for their recognizable style, her ability to capture the movement of natural forms and shapes, as well as the uncertainty of the relationship between man and nature. Some, such as Синята църква (Blue Church, 1916), Пазар (Market, 1963), or Градина в Калофер (Garden in Kalofer) capture the landscape around her. Others, were nudes, still lifes of flowers or fruit, and she produced quite a number of portraits, including ten portraits of her husband, her brother, some of her son, portraits of well-known personalities, as well as several self-portraits.

Because her husband was a diplomat, Vinarova spent the next two decades moving often. Between 1925 and 1940, they lived in The Hague in the Netherlands, Ankara in Turkey, and then spent eight years in the United States. From there, they moved to France; and then lived in London; Geneva, Switzerland; and finally Brussels, Belgium. She was well-known for her charm and during her Washington, D. C. days, created a stir when she appeared at one embassy reception in a dress with a crinoline designed in the style of the Second French Empire. During this period, Vinarova rarely painted, but resumed her work when the couple was recalled to Bulgaria in 1940 by Georgi Kyoseivanov. After the Bulgarian coup d'état of 1944, both Vinarova and Radev were removed from public life and forbidden to engage in political or social activities. Vinarova's works were barred from exhibitions and her husband was fired. It was difficult for him to secure work because he was unwilling to conform his historical writing with party ideology. She continued to produce art until 1963, when she lost the use of her left hand and became too ill to continue working. Late in her life, Vinarova was recognized by twice receiving the Order of Saints Cyril and Methodius (1963 and 1970) and later received the Red Flag of Labor.

== Death and legacy ==
Vinarova died on 15 April 1977 in Sofia. In 2010, her son, Traian Radev (bg) donated the family art collection containing over 740 of Vinarova's works, including 200 paintings, and 90 works from Otto Dix, Felixmüller, Obreshkov, Panayot Todorov Hristov (known as the Orphan Wanderer Bulgarian: Сирак Скитник), Konstantin Shtarkelov and others, to the Central State Archive (bg). After cataloging the collection, the Bulgarian National Gallery hosted an exhibit of Vinarova's works, most of which had never been seen by the public, in September 2013. In 2016, a second showing of Vinarova's work was held for the 65th anniversary of the Central Archive. Several of the works had been restored in a joint project financed by a Norwegian art conservation program and the skills of the employees of the Bulgarian National Art Gallery.
