= Simitli Point =

Headland in the South Shetland Islands

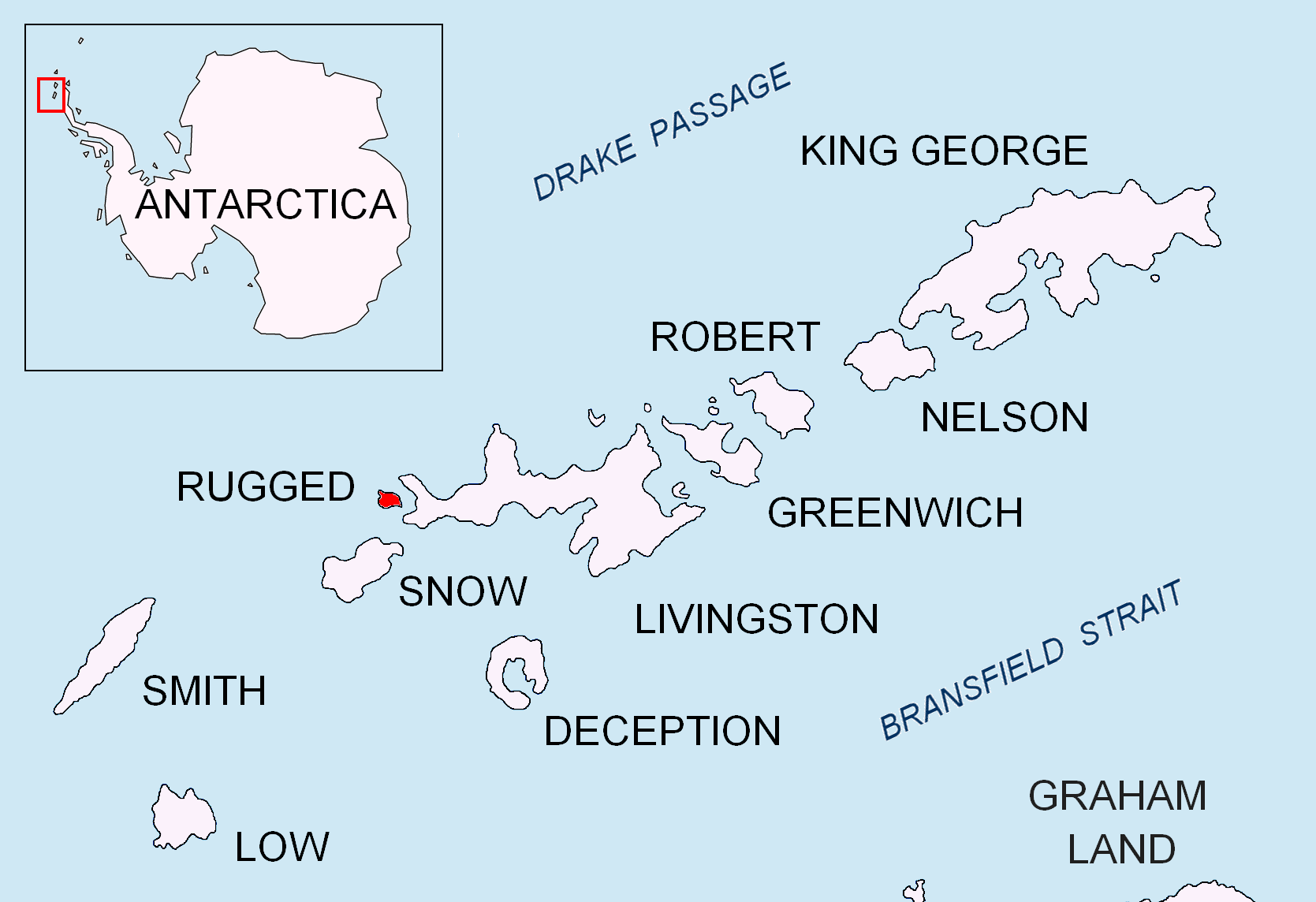
Location of Rugged Island in the South Shetland Islands

Topographic map of Livingston Island, Greenwich, Robert, Snow and Smith Islands

Simitli Point (Bulgarian: нос Симитли, ‘Nos Simitli’ \'nos 'si-mit-li\) is a point on the north coast of Rugged Island off the west coast of Byers Peninsula of Livingston Island in the South Shetland Islands, Antarctica. It forms the east side of the entrance to Timok Cove. It is situated 400 m west-southwest of Ivan Vladislav Point, and 2.91 km east-southeast of Cape Sheffield, and 3.61 km south-southwest of Start Point, Livingston Island.

The point is named after the town of Simitli in southwestern Bulgaria.

== Location ==
Simitli Point is located at 62°37′10.3″S 61°14′33″W. British mapping in 1968, Spanish in 1992 and Bulgarian in 2009.

== Maps ==
- Península Byers, Isla Livingston. Mapa topográfico a escala 1:25000. Madrid: Servicio Geográfico del Ejército, 1992.
- L.L. Ivanov. Antarctica: Livingston Island and Greenwich, Robert, Snow and Smith Islands. Scale 1:120000 topographic map. Troyan: Manfred Wörner Foundation, 2009. ISBN 978-954-92032-6-4
