= Eddystone Rocks (South Shetland Islands) =

Pair of rocky islets off Antarctica

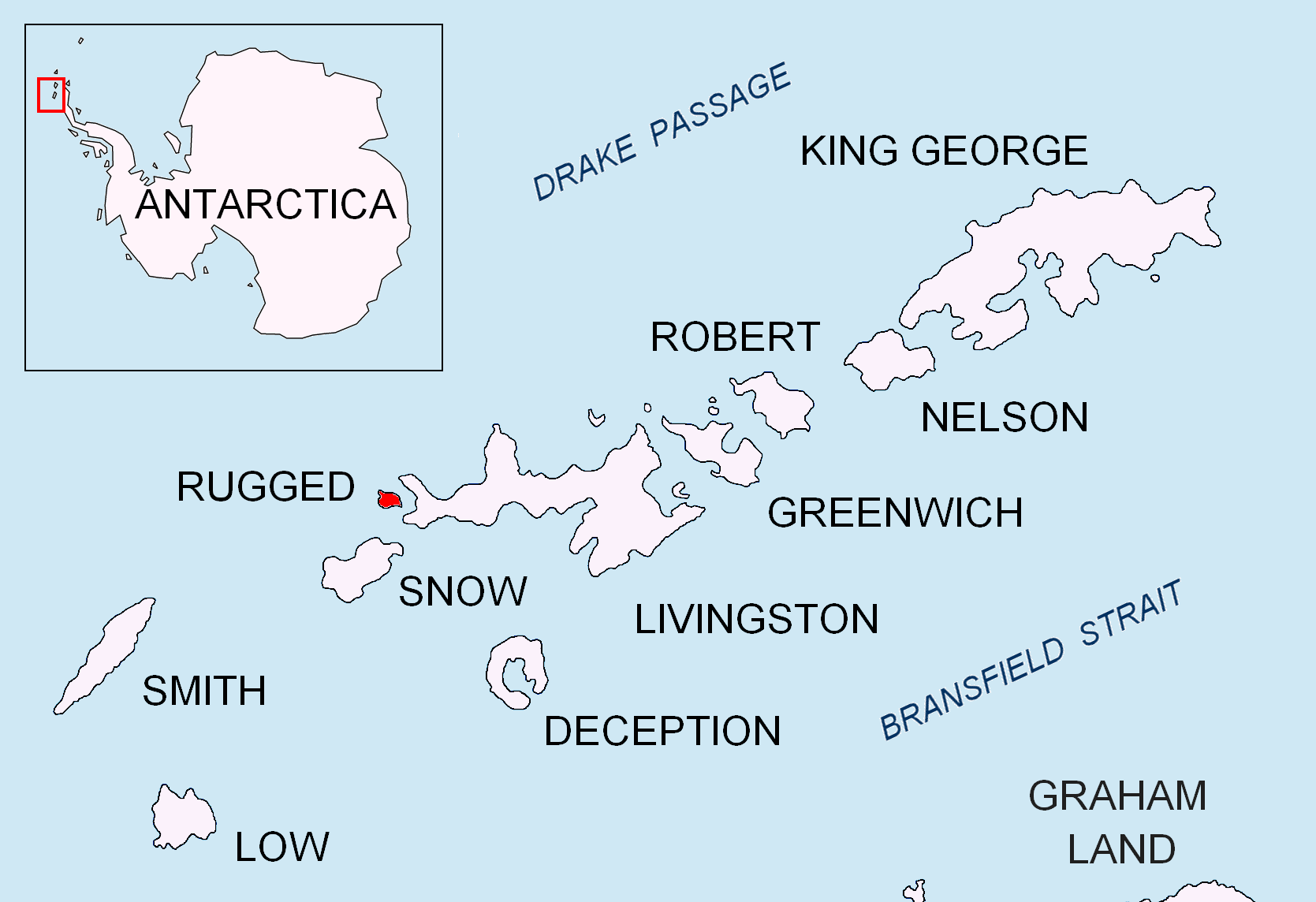
- Location of Eddystone Rocks

Geography
- Location: Antarctica
- Coordinates: 62°35′54.9″S 61°23′11.6″W
- Archipelago: South Shetland Islands

Administration
- Antarctica
- Administered under the Antarctic Treaty System

Demographics
- Population: uninhabited

Topographic map of Livingston Island and Smith Island

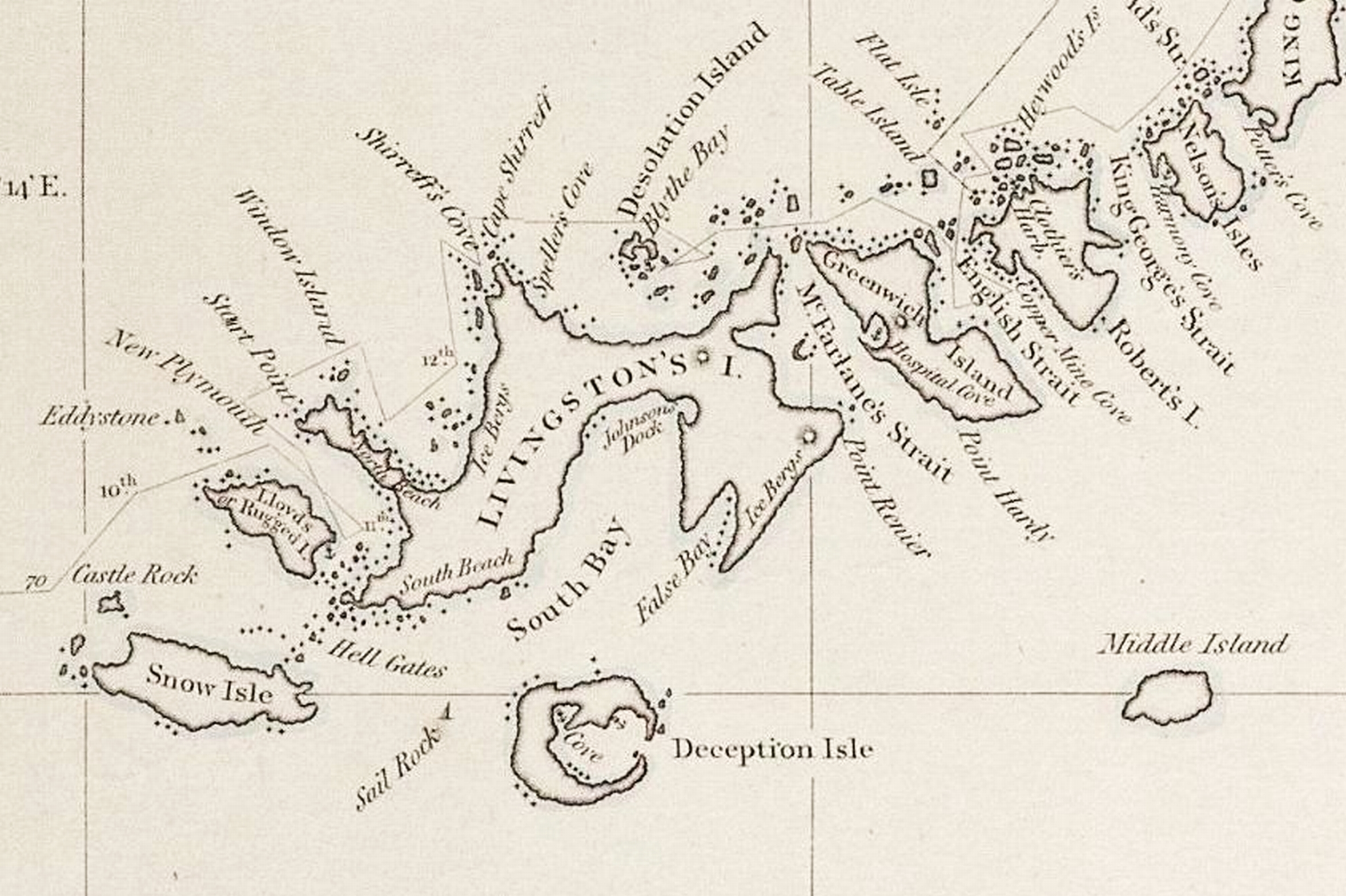
Fragment of George Powell's 1822 chart of the South Shetland Islands and South Orkney Islands featuring Eddystone Rocks

Eddystone Rocks is a group of two rocks (the north one being the larger) lying to the northwest of Rugged Island off western Livingston Island in the South Shetland Islands, Antarctica.

The feature was charted and named in 1821 by Robert Fildes after the Eddystone Rocks off Plymouth, England.

== Location ==
The rocks are centred at 62°35′54.9″S 61°23′11.6″W which is 3.54 km (2.2 mi) west-southwest of The Pointers, 4.73 km (2.94 mi) west-northwest of Cape Sheffield, Rugged Island, and 4.5 km (2.8 mi) northwest of Bekas Rock (British mapping in 1821, 1822, 1933 and 1968, French in 1937, Argentine in 1946, 1957 and 1980, Chilean in 1971, and Bulgarian in 2009 and 2017).

== See also ==
- Composite Antarctic Gazetteer
- List of Antarctic islands south of 60° S
- SCAR
- Territorial claims in Antarctica

== Maps ==
- Chart of South Shetland including Coronation Island, &c. from the exploration of the sloop Dove in the years 1821 and 1822 by George Powell Commander of the same. Scale ca. 1:200000. London: Laurie, 1822.
- South Shetland Islands. Scale 1:200000 topographic map No. 5657. DOS 610 – W 62 60. Tolworth, UK, 1968.
- Islas Livingston y Decepción. Mapa topográfico a escala 1:100000. Madrid: Servicio Geográfico del Ejército, 1991.
- L.L. Ivanov et al. Antarctica: Livingston Island and Greenwich Island, South Shetland Islands. Scale 1:100000 topographic map. Sofia: Antarctic Place-names Commission of Bulgaria, 2005.
- L.L. Ivanov. Antarctica: Livingston Island and Greenwich, Robert, Snow and Smith Islands. Scale 1:120000 topographic map. Troyan: Manfred Wörner Foundation, 2009. ISBN 978-954-92032-6-4
- Antarctic Digital Database (ADD). Scale 1:250000 topographic map of Antarctica. Scientific Committee on Antarctic Research (SCAR). Since 1993, regularly updated.
- L.L. Ivanov. Antarctica: Livingston Island and Smith Island. Scale 1:100000 topographic map. Manfred Wörner Foundation, 2017. ISBN 978-619-90008-3-0
