= Timok Cove =

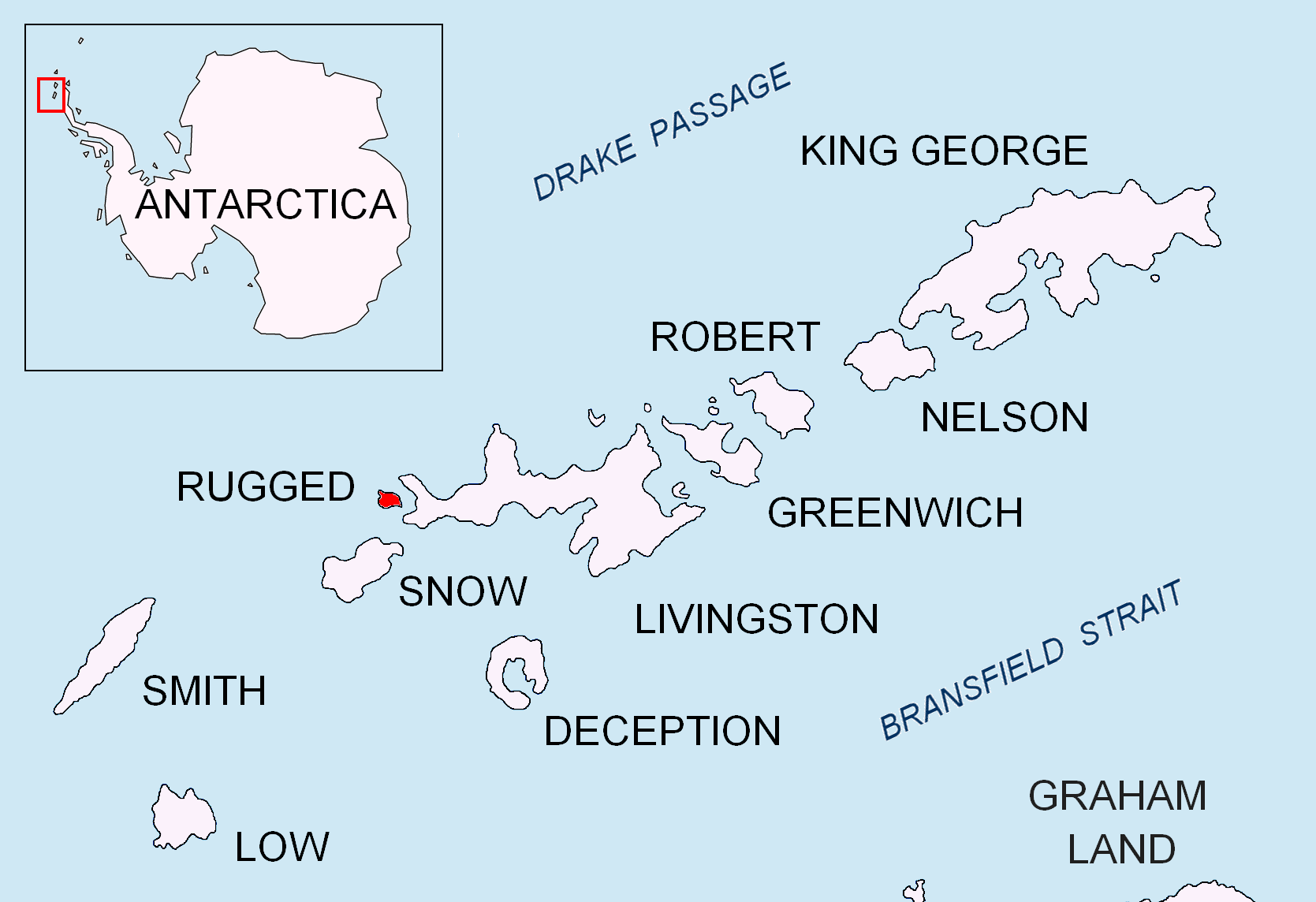
Location of Rugged Island in the South Shetland Islands.

Topographic map of Livingston Island and Smith Island.

Timok Cove (Bulgarian: залив Тимок, romanized: zaliv Timok, IPA: [ˈzalif ˈtimok]) is a 580 m wide cove indenting for 400 m the north coast of Rugged Island off the west coast of Byers Peninsula of Livingston Island in the South Shetland Islands, Antarctica, and entered west of Simitli Point.

The cove is "named after Timok River in Northwestern Bulgaria."

== Location ==
Timok Cove is located at 62°37′15″S 61°14′42″W. British mapping in 1968, Spanish in 1992 and Bulgarian in 2009.

== Maps ==
- Península Byers, Isla Livingston. Mapa topográfico a escala 1:25000. Madrid: Servicio Geográfico del Ejército, 1992.
- L.L. Ivanov. Antarctica: Livingston Island and Greenwich, Robert, Snow and Smith Islands. Scale 1:120000 topographic map. Troyan: Manfred Wörner Foundation, 2009. ISBN 978-954-92032-6-4
- Antarctic Digital Database (ADD). Scale 1:250000 topographic map of Antarctica. Scientific Committee on Antarctic Research (SCAR), 1993–2016.
