= Eddystone =

Eddystone may refer to:

== Places ==
Antarctica

- Eddystone Rocks (South Shetland Islands)

Australia

- Eddystone (Tasmania), off the south coast of Tasmania
- Eddystone Point, on the northeast coast of Tasmania

Falkland Islands

- Eddystone Rock, Falklands Islands

Solomon Islands

- Simbo, formerly Eddystone Island

United Kingdom

- Eddystone Rocks, Devon
- Eddystone Lighthouse, Devon

United States

- Eddystone, Pennsylvania
  - Eddystone station, a SEPTA station
- New Eddystone Rock, Alaska

== Other uses ==
- Eddystone (Google)
- Eddystone Building, Detroit, Michigan
- Eddystone – a ship launched at Hull in 1802 that was wrecked in 1843.
- Eddystone (HBC vessel), operated by the HBC from 1807 to 1823, see Hudson's Bay Company vessels
- Eddystone, an Armstrong Whitworth Ensign aircraft
