= Simeon Radev =

Bulgarian journalist, diplomat and politician (1879–1967)

- Симеон Радев
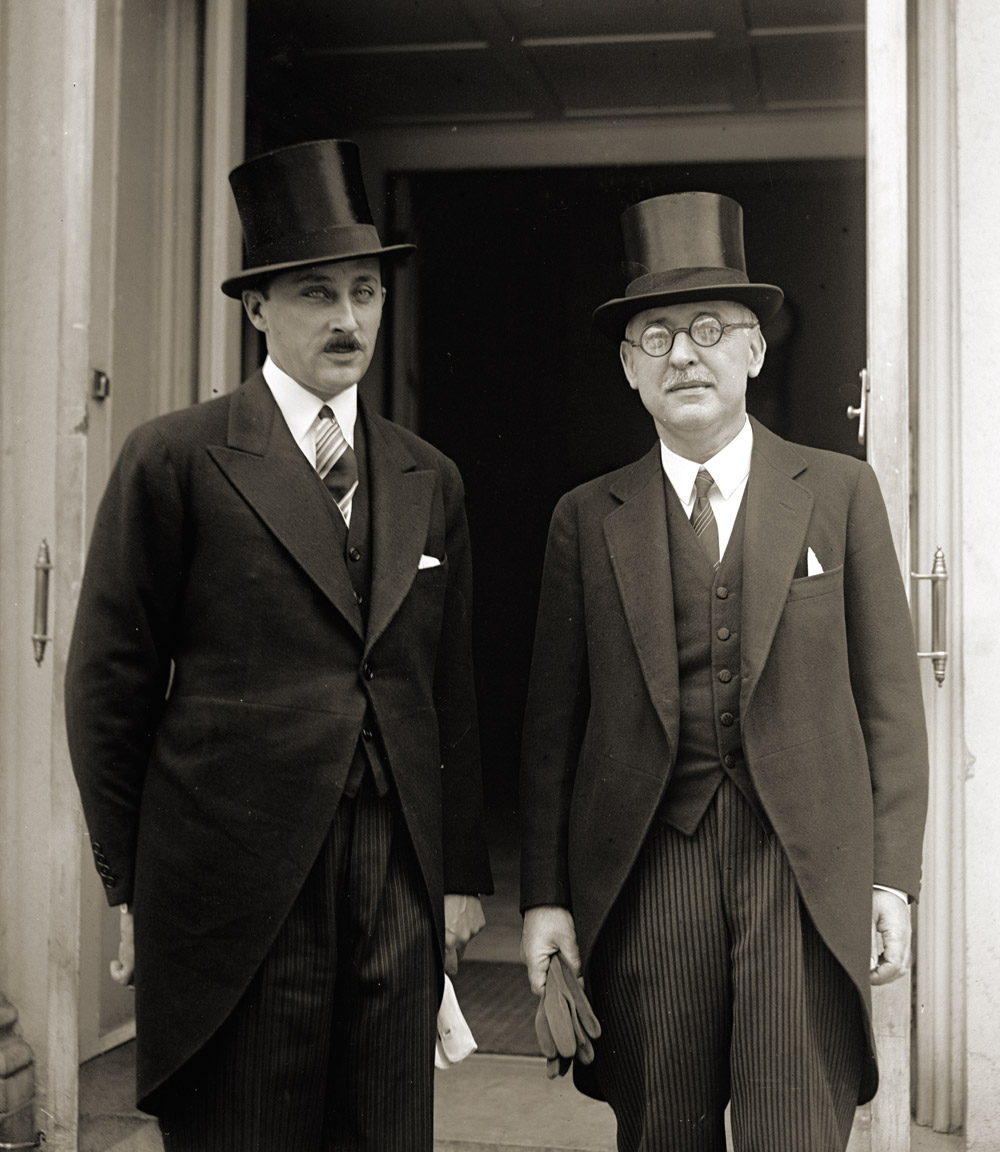
- Prince Kiril of Bulgaria (left) and Simeon Radev (right)
- Born: January 19, 1879; Resen, Ottoman Empire
- Died: February 15, 1967 (aged 88); Sofia, People's Republic of Bulgaria
- Citizenship: Bulgarian
- Occupations: Journalist, diplomat, historian
- Children: 1 son
- Writing career
- Genres: History, literary criticism

Simeon Traychev Radev (Bulgarian: Симеон Трайчев Радев; 19 January 1879 – 15 February 1967) was a Bulgarian writer, journalist, diplomat and historian, most famous for his three-volume book The Builders of Modern Bulgaria.

== Biography ==
Radev was born in the town of Resen in the Macedonia region of the Ottoman Empire in 1879. He studied at the Bulgarian schools in Resen, Ohrid and Bitola before finishing the Galatasaray High School in Constantinople. He graduated in law from the University of Geneva, where he studied with Venelin Ganev. Radev became interested in journalism and was a regular contributor to the Evening Mail newspaper from 1901 on; he later became editor and editor-in-chief of the newspaper. In 1905, he started issuing the Artist magazine. In 1908, he participated in the foundation of the Union of the Bulgarian Constitutional Clubs, a Bulgarian political party in the Ottoman Empire. Later, he created the daily newspaper Will and was active in its publication. Towards that time he published his book The Builders of Modern Bulgaria, one of the largest original historiographic studies of Bulgaria at the time. The book was an in-depth study of the Principality of Bulgaria's formation and its early political years.

From an early age Radev devoted himself to diplomacy. In 1913, he participated in the conference which led to the signing of the Treaty of Bucharest; he remained a Bulgarian minister plenipotentiary in Bucharest until 1916. After Romania joined World War I, he was moved to Bern, Switzerland. In 1917, he handed in his resignation, left Switzerland and joined the Bulgarian Army as a soldier of the Macedonian-Adrianopolitan Volunteer Corps. Towards the end of the war Radev was one of the Bulgarian representatives who signed the Thessaloniki Armistice. After the war, Radev was Bulgarian minister plenipotentiary in The Hague, Ankara, Washington, D.C., London and Brussels. He was the first Bulgarian delegate to the League of Nations in Geneva. In 1923, he married the Bulgarian painter, Bistra Vinarova and the couple subsequently had one son, Trayan Radev (bg).

In 1918, Radev published his book Macedonia and the Bulgarian Renaissance in the 19th Century (French: La Macédoine et la Renaissance Bulgare au XIXe siècle) in French. It was translated to Bulgarian in 1927 and republished as an issue of the Macedonian Scientific Institute, of which Radev was a member. In the book, he defined the Macedonian region as the motherland of Bulgarian patriotism. Besides being active in historiography, journalism and diplomacy, Radev was an avid connoisseur of literature and arts. He published several critical articles and took an active part in Bulgaria's literary and artistic life. Some of his articles were published in the book Insights into the Literate and Arts and Personal Memories, released in 1965 and provoking a significant interest.

Simeon Radev died aged 88 in the Bulgarian capital Sofia on 15 February 1967, only several days after his last book Early Memories was ready for printing. Reportedly, his last words were:

Did I give anything to Bulgaria?

== Honours ==
Radev Point on Rugged Island in the South Shetland Islands, Antarctica, is named after Simeon Radev.

== Works ==
- Early Memories
- What I saw in the Balkan Wars
- The Builders of Modern Bulgaria, Volume 1
- The Builders of Modern Bulgaria, Volume 2
- The Builders of Modern Bulgaria, Volume 3

== Sources ==
- "Биографични бележки: Симеон Радев" (in Bulgarian). Slovo.bg.
- Бакалов, Георги; Милен Куманов (2003). "Радев, Симеон Трайчев (9.I.1879–15.II.1967)". Електронно издание "История на България" (in Bulgarian). София: Труд, Сирма. ISBN 954528613X.
- Гърдев, Борислав (January 2008). "Живот в служба на България" (in Bulgarian). Media Times Review. Archived from the original on 2008-10-11.
- Цветаноски, Виктор (2006-10-16). "Кој е Симеон Радев: Во Париз се величеше човекот што се борел за бугарската кауза". Утрински Весник (in Macedonian). Archived from the original on 2007-09-26.
