= Hersilia Cove =

Cove in the South Shetland Islands, Antarctica

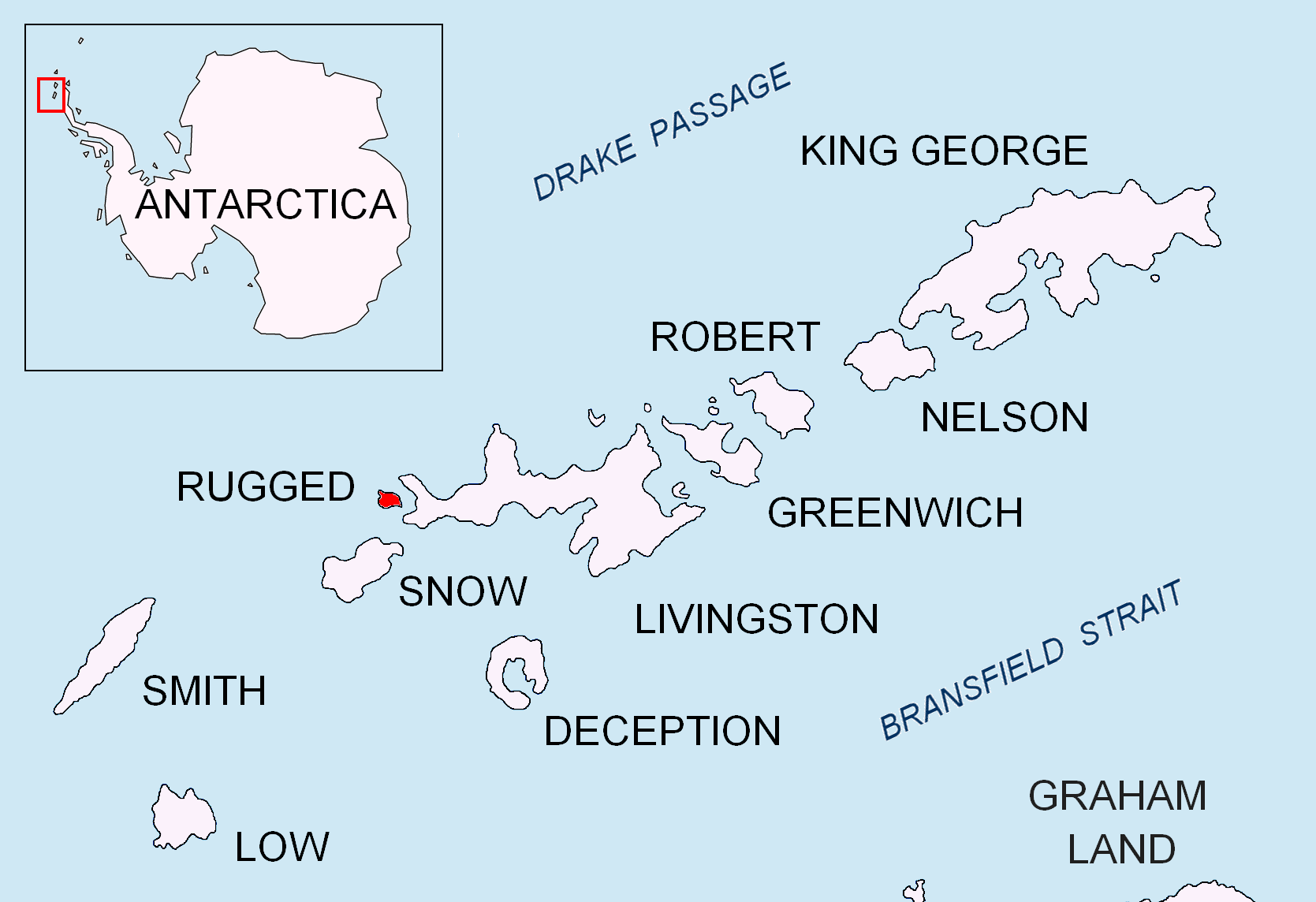
Location of Rugged Island in the South Shetland Islands

Topographic map of Livingston Island and Smith Island

Hersilia Cove is the 650 m wide cove indenting for 800 m the north coast of Rugged Island in the South Shetland Islands, Antarctica west of Herring Point.

== Location ==
Hersilia Cove is centred at 62°37′29.5″S 61°12′31″W (US mapping in 1821, British mapping in 1943 and 1968, Argentine mapping in 1958 and 1980, Chilean mapping in 1971, detailed Spanish mapping in 1992, and Bulgarian mapping in 2005 and 2009).

== History ==
The cove was named in February 1820 by Captain James Sheffield, Master of the brig Hersilia, the first American sealer known to have visited the South Shetlands. It was the starting point of Antarctic sealing south of 60° south latitude, when the ship Espirito Santo with English crew under Captain Joseph Herring and chartered in Buenos Aires arrived to the cove on Christmas Day of 1819.

== Maps ==
- Península Byers, Isla Livingston. Mapa topográfico a escala 1:25000. Madrid: Servicio Geográfico del Ejército, 1992.
- L.L. Ivanov. Antarctica: Livingston Island and Greenwich, Robert, Snow and Smith Islands. Scale 1:120000 topographic map. Troyan: Manfred Wörner Foundation, 2009. ISBN 978-954-92032-6-4
