= Herring Point =

Point on the north coast of Rugged Island in Antarctica

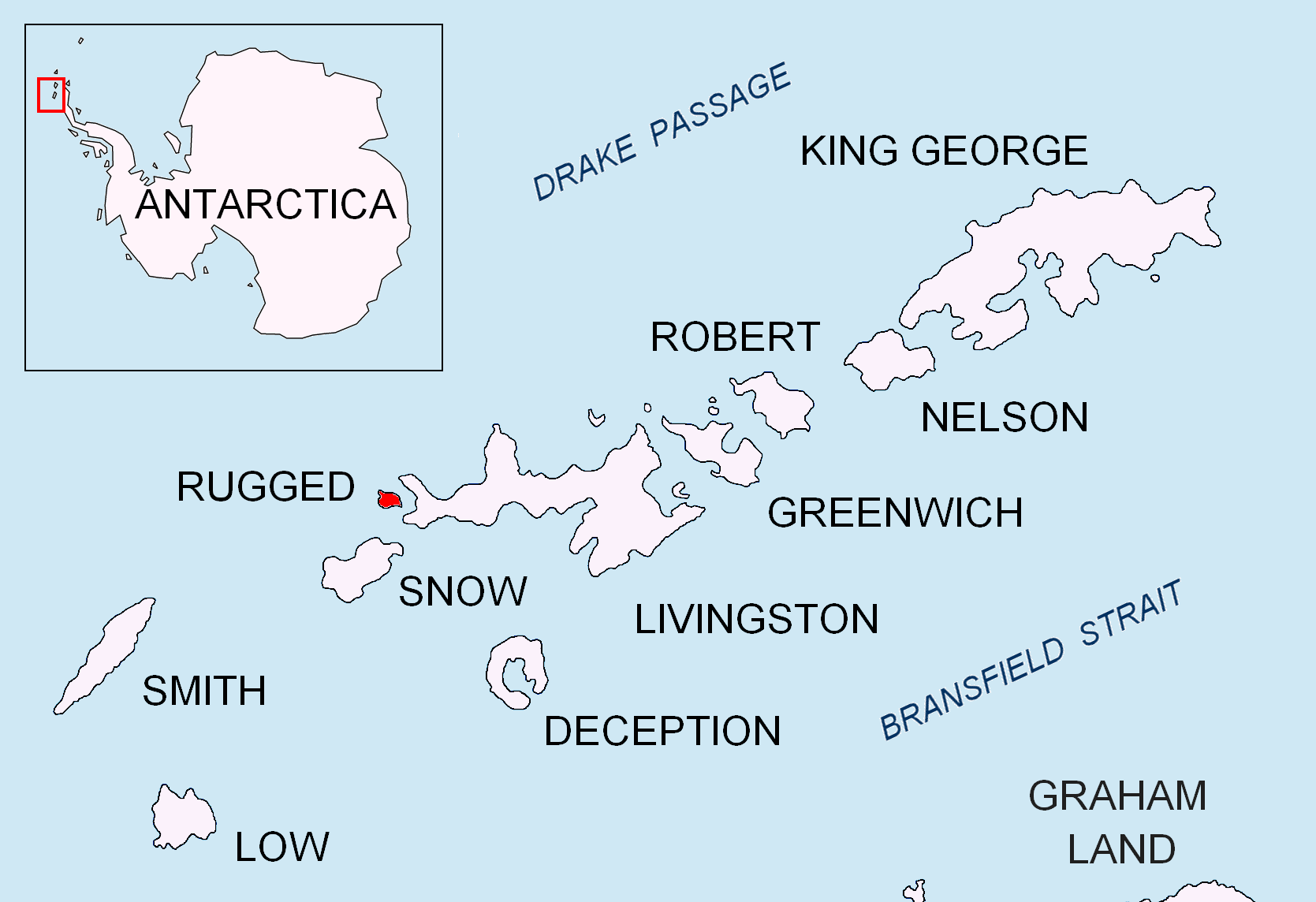
Location of Rugged Island in the South Shetland Islands.

Topographic map of Livingston Island, Greenwich, Robert, Snow and Smith Islands.

Herring Point (Bulgarian: нос Херинг, ‘Nos Herring’ \'nos 'he-ring\) is a point on the north coast of Rugged Island off the west coast of Byers Peninsula of Livingston Island in the South Shetland Islands, Antarctica forming the east side of the entrance to Hersilia Cove.

The point is named after the English Captain Joseph Herring whose ship the Espirito Santo set the beginning of Antarctic sealing south of 60° south latitude in Hersilia Cove on Christmas Day 1819.

== Location ==
Herring Point is located at 62°37′25″S 61°12′17.8″W, which is 4.89 km east-southeast of Cape Sheffield, 1.63 km east-southeast of Ivan Vladislav Point, 3.92 km south by west of Start Point and 1.31 km northwest of Vund Point. British mapping in 1968, detailed Spanish mapping in 1992, and Bulgarian mapping in 2005 and 2009.

== Maps ==
- Península Byers, Isla Livingston. Mapa topográfico a escala 1:25000. Madrid: Servicio Geográfico del Ejército, 1992.
- L.L. Ivanov et al. Antarctica: Livingston Island and Greenwich Island, South Shetland Islands. Scale 1:100000 topographic map. Sofia: Antarctic Place-names Commission of Bulgaria, 2005.
- L.L. Ivanov. Antarctica: Livingston Island and Greenwich, Robert, Snow and Smith Islands. Scale 1:120000 topographic map. Troyan: Manfred Wörner Foundation, 2009. ISBN 978-954-92032-6-4
