= Stoyan Radev =

Bulgarian theatre and film director

Stoyan Radev (Bulgarian: Стоян Радев) is a Bulgarian theatre and film director. He graduated from the National Academy for Theatre and Film Art in 1998. He lives and works in Sofia, Bulgaria.

== Theatre ==
- 1996 – "Reprieve" based on texts by Kafka, Student's Theatre
- 1997 – "Shakespeare for the Fans" based on comedies by Shakespeare, Satire Theatre
- 1998 – "An Etude for a Room and a Voice" based on "The Human Voice" by Jean Cocteau, Theatre Laboratory Sfumato
- 2000 – "Solaris" by Stanislaw Lem, Theatre Laboratory Sfumato
- 2003 – "Salome" by Oscar Wilde, National Theatre "Ivan Vazov"
- 2005 – "The Brothers Karamazov" by F.M. Dostoyevsky, Plovdiv Theatre
- 2007 – "The Doll’s House" by Ibsen, Bulgarian Army Theatre
- 2010 – "Snegiryov" based on texts by F.M. Dostoyevsky, National Theatre "Ivan Vazov"
- 2014 – "The Assassins of Salonika" by G. Danailov, National Theatre "Ivan Vazov"
- 2016 – "No Man's Land" based on the film script by Danis Tanovic, National Theatre "Ivan Vazov"
- 2018 – "Hangmen" by Martin McDonagh, Sofia Theatre
- 2018 – "Nice to Meet You, I Am Iva" by Iva Todorova, 199 Theatre
- 2018 – "An Attempt at Flying" by Yordan Radichkov, National Theatre "Ivan Vazov"
- 2019 – “One Night Stand 2019”, stand-up comedy, National Palace of Culture
- 2019 – "Le Libertin" by Éric-Emmanuel Schmitt, Sofia Theatre
- 2019 – "A Woman of No Importance" by Oscar Wilde, Bulgarian Army Theatre
- 2020 – "Ghost" based on Nikolay Haytov stories, National Theatre "Ivan Vazov"
- 2020 – “One Night Stand 2020”, stand-up comedy, National Palace of Culture
- 2020 – “The Good, the Bad and Krassimira”, stand-up comedy, Olya Malinova, Elisaveta Belobradova, Krasimira Hadjiivanova, Three Women on the Microphone
- 2020 – "Who's Afraid of Virginia Woolf" by Edward Albee, Little City Theatre 'Off The Channel'
- 2021 – "Lament of an Angel" by Stefan Tsanev, National Theatre "Ivan Vazov"
- 2021 – "Cyrano de Bergerac" by Edmond Rostand, Bulgarian Army Theatre
- 2021 – "Iva Is Online" by Iva Todorova, 199 Theatre
- 2021 – "All the Little Lights" by Jane Upton, Azaryan Theatre
- 2022 – “One Night Stand 2022”, stand-up comedy, National Palace of Culture
- 2022 – “Ministry of Happiness”, stand-up comedy, Olya Malinova, Three women on the Microphone
- 2022 – "Golemanov" by St.L. Kostov, National Theatre "Ivan Vazov"
- 2022 – "Crimes of the Heart" by Beth Henley, Youth Theatre "Nikolay Binev"
- 2022 – "No Exit" by Jean-Paul Sartre, Theatre "Vazrajdane"
- 2023 – "Performance and a Half" by Stoyan Radev, Bulgarian Army Theatre
- 2023 – "The Vagina Monologues" by Eve Ensler, Bonini Theatre
- 2023 – “One Night Stand 2023”, stand-up comedy, National Palace of Culture
- 2023 – “Mutters, Cleans, Hauls”, stand-up comedy, Krasimira Hadjiivanova, Three Women on the Microphone
- 2023 – “Exhalation" by Ted Chiang, 199 Theatre
- 2023 – "Jumpy" by April De Angelis, Little City Theatre 'Off The Channel'
- 2023 – "My God" by Thea Donoljubova, National Theatre "Ivan Vazov"
- 2024 – “Normal”, stand-up comedy, Galya Petkova, Three Women on the Microphone
- 2024 – “Trois versions de la vie” by Yasmina Reza, I Am Studio
- 2024 – “One Night Stand 2024”, stand-up comedy, National Palace of Culture
- 2024 – “The Funniest Show Ever”, stand-up comedy, Iva Todorova, Sofia Live Club
- 2024 – “We Also Play Romeo and Juliet”, based on Shakespeare, Sofia Puppet Theatre
- 2024 – “About Freedom and Death”, stand-up comedy, Elisaveta Belobradova, National Palace of Culture
- 2024 – “Rupert’s Birthday” by Ken Jenkins, Youth Theatre
- 2024 – “From Bulgaria with Love”, stand-up comedy, Krasimira Hadjiivanova, Iva Todorova, Olya Malinova, Three Women on the Microphone
- 2024 – “Mother Courage and Her Children” by Bertolt Brecht, Satire Theatre
- 2025 – "Hamlet" by William Shakespeare, Bulgarian Army Theatre
- 2025 – “One Night Stand 2025”, stand-up comedy, National Palace of Culture
- 2025 – "Berlin, Berlin” by Patrick Haudecoeur and Gérald Sibleyras, Plovdiv Theatre
- 2025 – "A Winter's Dream Tale" by Alexandar Sekulov, Little City Theatre 'Off The Channel'
- 2025 – "The Worst is Yet to Come", stand-up comedy, Elisaveta Belobradova, Three Women on the Microphone
- 2026 – "Shouts from the Underground", based on "Notes from Underground" by Dostoyevsky, Artitude, Toplocetrala
- 2026 – "Dreadnoughts. A Play for a Female Audience”, by Yevgeni Grishkovetz, Plovdiv Theatre
- 2026 – “One Night Stand 2026”, stand-up comedy, National Palace of Culture
- 2026 – "Rival's Aria" by Eric-Emmanuel Schmitt, National Theatre "Ivan Vazov"
- 2026 – “Aneto” by Angel Karaliichev, Sofia Puppet Theatre
- 2026 – “Witness for the Prosecution” by Agatha Christie, Varna Drama Theatre
- 2026 – „One Night Stand Men Edition“, stand-up comedy, Три жени на микрофона, Национален дворец на културата

== Films, Music Videos, TV Commercials ==
- 2005 – "Fate", a dance movie, TV
- 2008 – "In Memoriam" part of "15", a film omnibus comprising 15 short movies by 15 renowned Bulgarian directors, produced by Agitprop
- 2009 – "The Little Prince", a documentary film for the Big Read Campaign, BNT
- 2013 – "And Bulgaria is a Giant Mistake Too" – a documentary film, Bulgarian Film Centre, Front Film
- 2013 – "Fourth Estate" – TV series, BNT
- 2015 – "Worlds"– a documentary film, Maria's World Foundation
- 2015 – "Voices in the Chocho's Makeup Room" – a documentary film, Ikar Foundation
- 2021 – "I Can Work"– a documentary film, Maria's World Foundation

== Nominations and awards ==
- 2007, 2005, 2003, 2000 – Nominated for Best Theatre Director by the Union of Bulgarian Artists and Askeer Awards
- 2002 – Best TV Commercial, "The Chorus", FARA, Bulgaria
- 2007 – Best TV Commercial, "In Love", FARA, Bulgaria
- 2008-2002 – Nominations for Best Music Video, MMTV, BG Radio
- 2009 – Top spot for a week of June on MTV World Chart Express, "Zoom" by Marius Moga, Nevena& Nivo
- 2009 – Best TV Commercial, "Beckham", FARA, Bulgaria
- 2009 – "The Little Prince" voted "Best Movie" by the colleague participants in the Big Read TV campaign
- 2010-2003 – Nominations for Best TV Commercial, FARA, Bulgaria
- 2011 – Best TV Commercial, Shumensko "The Social Network", FARA, Bulgaria
- 2011 – International Advertising Festival Golden Drum Best TVC nomination (Drinks), "The Social Network"
- 2011 – Silver Epica Award (Alcoholic Drinks), Shumensko "The Social Network"
- 2012 – Best TV Commercial, Shumensko "130 Anniversary", FARA, Bulgaria
- 2014 – CIRCOM award for Feature Film, Fourth Estate (TV series)
- 2014 – Bulgarian Film Academy Award for Best TV series, Fourth Estate
- 2014 – Golden Quill Award for contribution to Bulgarian art and culture
- 2017 – Bronze Award, DSK BANK Customer Loans (1–3), FARA, Bulgaria
- 2018 – Bronze Award, DSK BANK Customer Loans (4–6), FARA, Bulgaria
- 2021 – nominated for Best Theatre Director by the Union of Bulgarian Artists (for "Ghost")
- 2021 – Best Theatre Director Award by A'Askeer Academy (for "Who's Afraid of Virginia Woolf" and "Lament of an Angel")
- 2021 – "Cyrano de Bergerac" voted Cultural Event of the Year by the readers of www.ploshtadslaveikov.com website
- 2022 – Nominated for Best Theatre Director by the Union of Bulgarian Artists for "Iva is Online"
- 2022 – Viewers Choice Award for Best Theatre Performance on the Union of Bulgarian Artists Vote (for "Iva is Online")
- 2022 – Best Performance Award, SOLO ACT International Monodrama Festival (for “Lament of an Angel”)
- 2022 – Nomination for Best Monodrama Askeer Awards (for "Iva is Online")
- 2024 – Best Theatre Director Award “Golden Koukerikon” (for "The Vagina Monologues")
- 2024 – Sofia Municipality Award for Bright Achievements in Theatre
- 2025 – Nominated for Best Theatre Director by the Union of Bulgarian Artists for "Mother Courage and Her Children"
- 2025 – Nominated for Best Puppet Theatre Performance by the Union of Bulgarian Artists for "We Also Play Romeo and Juliet"
- 2025 – Best Monodrama Askeer Award (for "Rupert’s Birthday")
- 2026 – Best Theatre Director Award of the Union of Bulgarian Artists (for "Berlin, Berlin")
- 2026 – Best Theatre Performance Award of the Union of Bulgarian Artists (for "Berlin, Berlin")
- 2026 – Nominated for Plovdiv Municipality Award for Bright Achievements in Theatre
- 2026 – Nomination for Best Monodrama Askeer Awards (for "Shouts from the Underground")
