= Konstantin Shtarkelov =

Bulgarian painter

Shtarkelov Konstantin
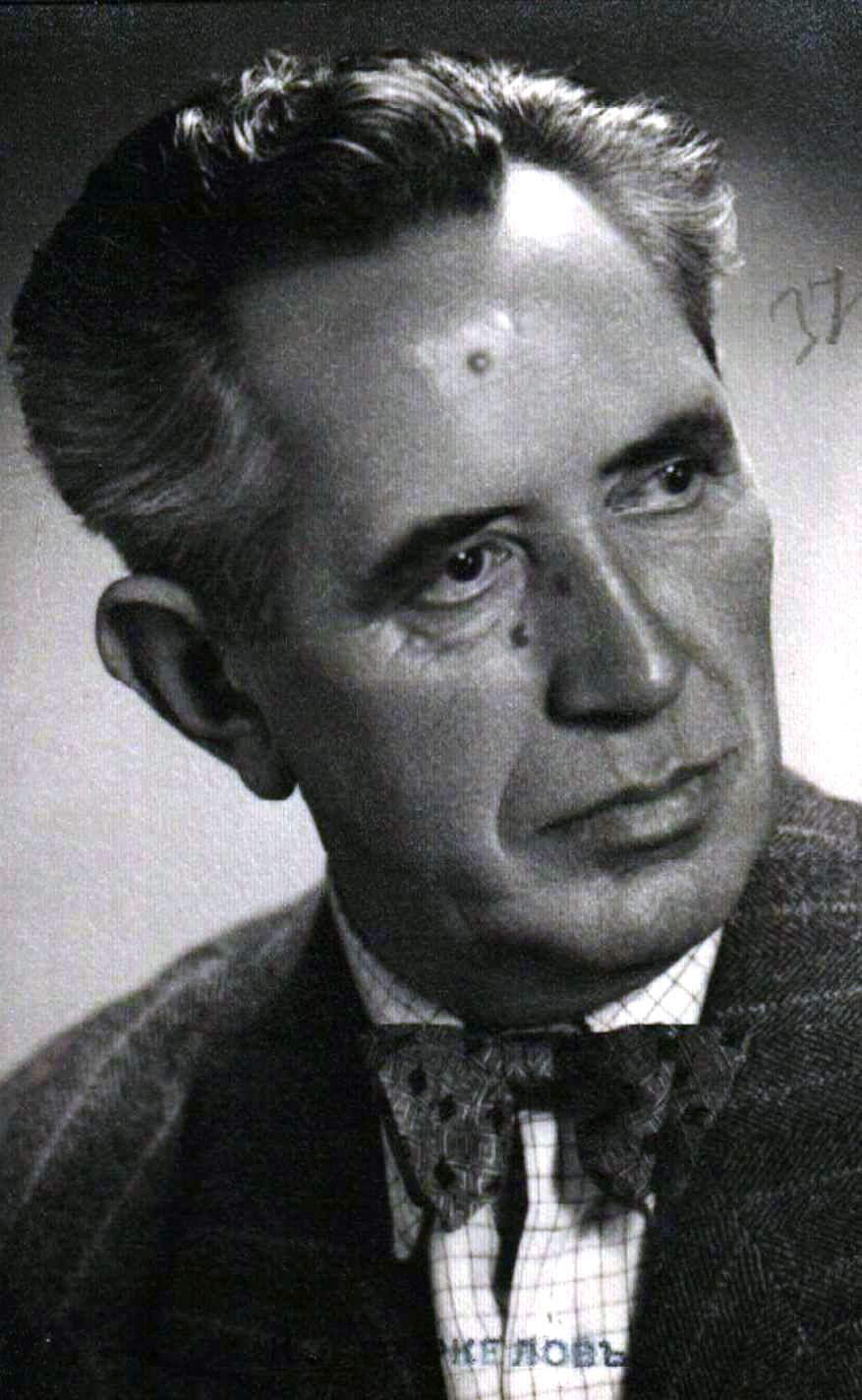
- Born: 20 March 1889; Sofia, Bulgaria
- Died: 29 April 1961; Sofia, Bulgaria
- Known for: Painting, Watercolor, and Realism

Konstantin Georgiev Shtarkelov (Bulgarian: Константин Щъркелов; March 20, 1889 – April 29, 1961) was a Bulgarian painter. He was born in Sofia and died in Sofia.

Shtarkelov began studying art at the State School of Drawing in Sofia in 1906. In 1889 he moved to Odesa, where he performed as a singer and lived in a monastery.

Revealed the poetics of Bulgarian mountains: Mt Rila, Mt Vitosha, the Rhodope Mountains.

Represented in the collection by a landscape entitled Birch.
