= Vund Point =

Point forming the east extremity of Rugged Island in Antarctica

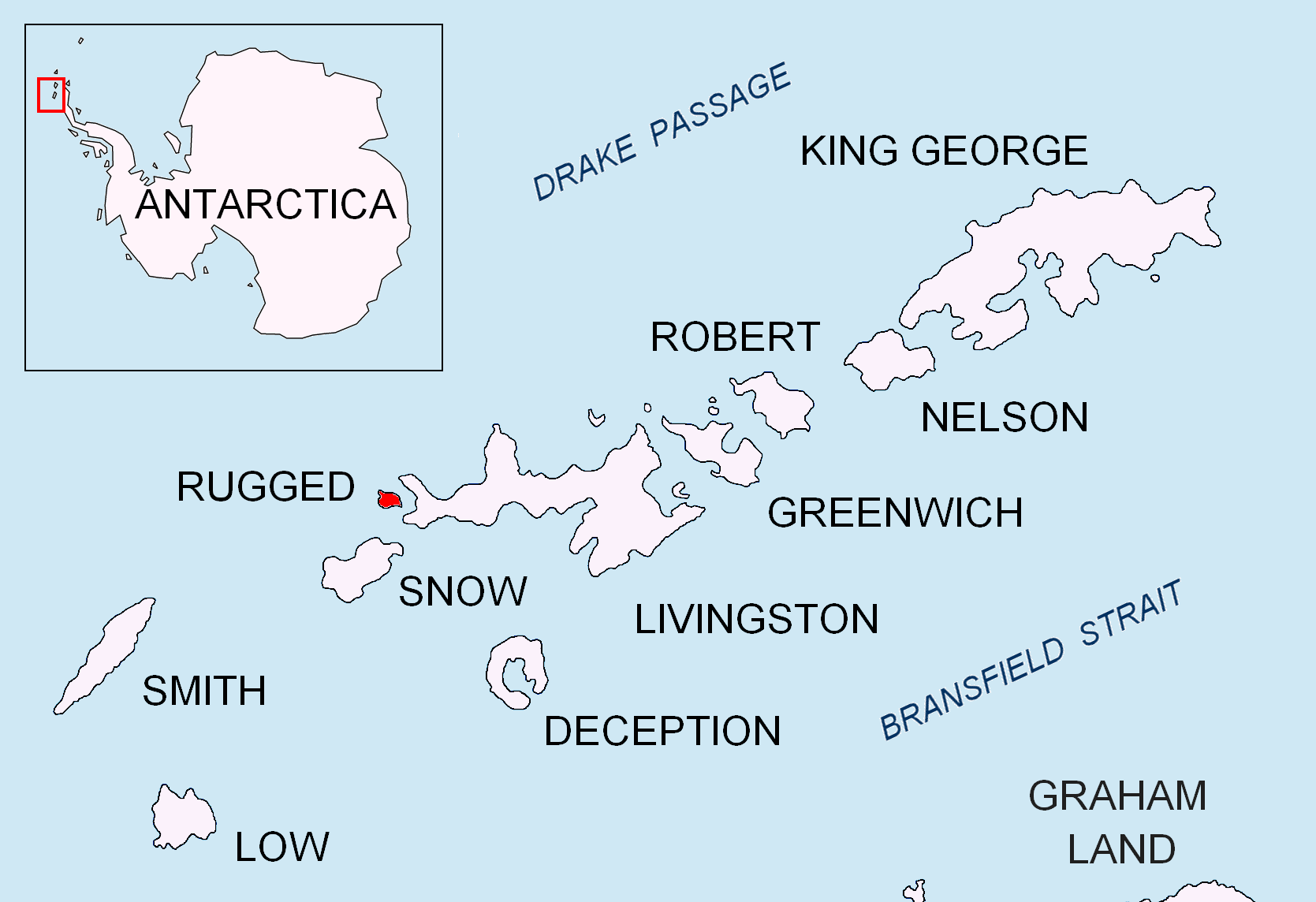
Location of Rugged Island in the South Shetland Islands.

Topographic map of Livingston Island and Smith Island.

Vund Point (Bulgarian: нос Вунд, ‘Nos Vund’ \'nos 'vund\) is the point forming the east extremity of Rugged Island off the west coast of Byers Peninsula of Livingston Island in the South Shetland Islands, Antarctica. The area was visited by early 19th century sealers.

The point is named after Vund, a Bulgar ruler in the Caucasus who established the Principality of Vanand in Armenia in the late 4th Century CE.

== Location ==
Vund Point is located at 62°37′58.1″S 61°11′20.5″W, which is 1.05 km northeast of Radev Point, 1.31 km southeast of Herring Point, and 2.03 km west-northwest of Laager Point on Livingston Island (British mapping in 1968, Spanish in 1992 and Bulgarian in 2005 and 2009).

== Maps ==
- Península Byers, Isla Livingston. Mapa topográfico a escala 1:25000. Madrid: Servicio Geográfico del Ejército, 1992.
- L.L. Ivanov et al. Antarctica: Livingston Island and Greenwich Island, South Shetland Islands. Scale 1:100000 topographic map. Sofia: Antarctic Place-names Commission of Bulgaria, 2005.
- L.L. Ivanov. Antarctica: Livingston Island and Greenwich, Robert, Snow and Smith Islands. Scale 1:120000 topographic map. Troyan: Manfred Wörner Foundation, 2009. ISBN 978-954-92032-6-4
- Antarctic Digital Database (ADD). Scale 1:250000 topographic map of Antarctica. Scientific Committee on Antarctic Research (SCAR). Since 1993, regularly upgraded and updated.
- L.L. Ivanov. Antarctica: Livingston Island and Smith Island. Scale 1:100000 topographic map. Manfred Wörner Foundation, 2017. ISBN 978-619-90008-3-0
