= Radev Point =

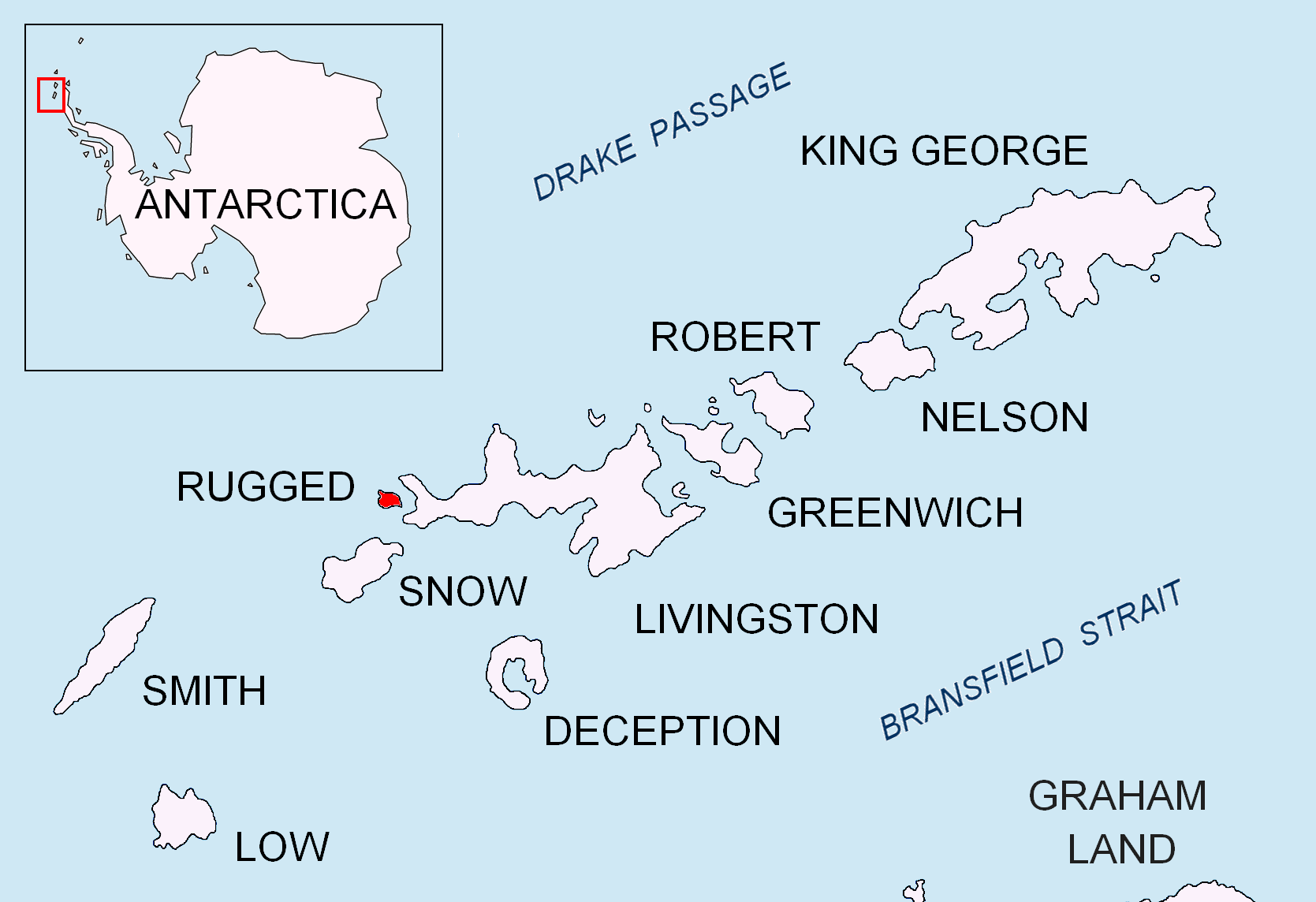
Location of Rugged Island in the South Shetland Islands.

Topographic map of Livingston Island and Smith Island.

Radev Point (Bulgarian: Радев нос, ‘Radev Nos’ \'ra-dev 'nos\) is a point in the southeast extremity of Rugged Island off the west coast of Byers Peninsula of Livingston Island in the South Shetland Islands, Antarctica. Kianida Reef lies 440 m southwest of the point. The feature is situated 4.5 km east of Benson Point, 1.05 km southwest of Vund Point, and 2.62 km west by south of Laager Point, Livingston Island.

The point is named after the prominent Bulgarian historiographer, writer and diplomat Simeon Radev (1879 – 1967).

== Location ==
Radev Point is located at 62°38′24.9″S 61°12′06″W. British mapping in 1968, Spanish in 1992 and Bulgarian in 2005 and 2009.

== Maps ==
- Península Byers, Isla Livingston. Mapa topográfico a escala 1:25000. Madrid: Servicio Geográfico del Ejército, 1992.
- L.L. Ivanov. Antarctica: Livingston Island and Greenwich, Robert, Snow and Smith Islands. Scale 1:120000 topographic map. Troyan: Manfred Wörner Foundation, 2009. ISBN 978-954-92032-6-4
- Antarctic Digital Database (ADD). Scale 1:250000 topographic map of Antarctica. Scientific Committee on Antarctic Research (SCAR). Since 1993, regularly upgraded and updated.
- L.L. Ivanov. Antarctica: Livingston Island and Smith Island. Scale 1:100000 topographic map. Manfred Wörner Foundation, 2017. ISBN 978-619-90008-3-0

== See also ==
- List of Antarctic and subantarctic islands
- Islands of Antarctica
