= Cape Sheffield =

Cape in the South Shetland Islands of Antarctica

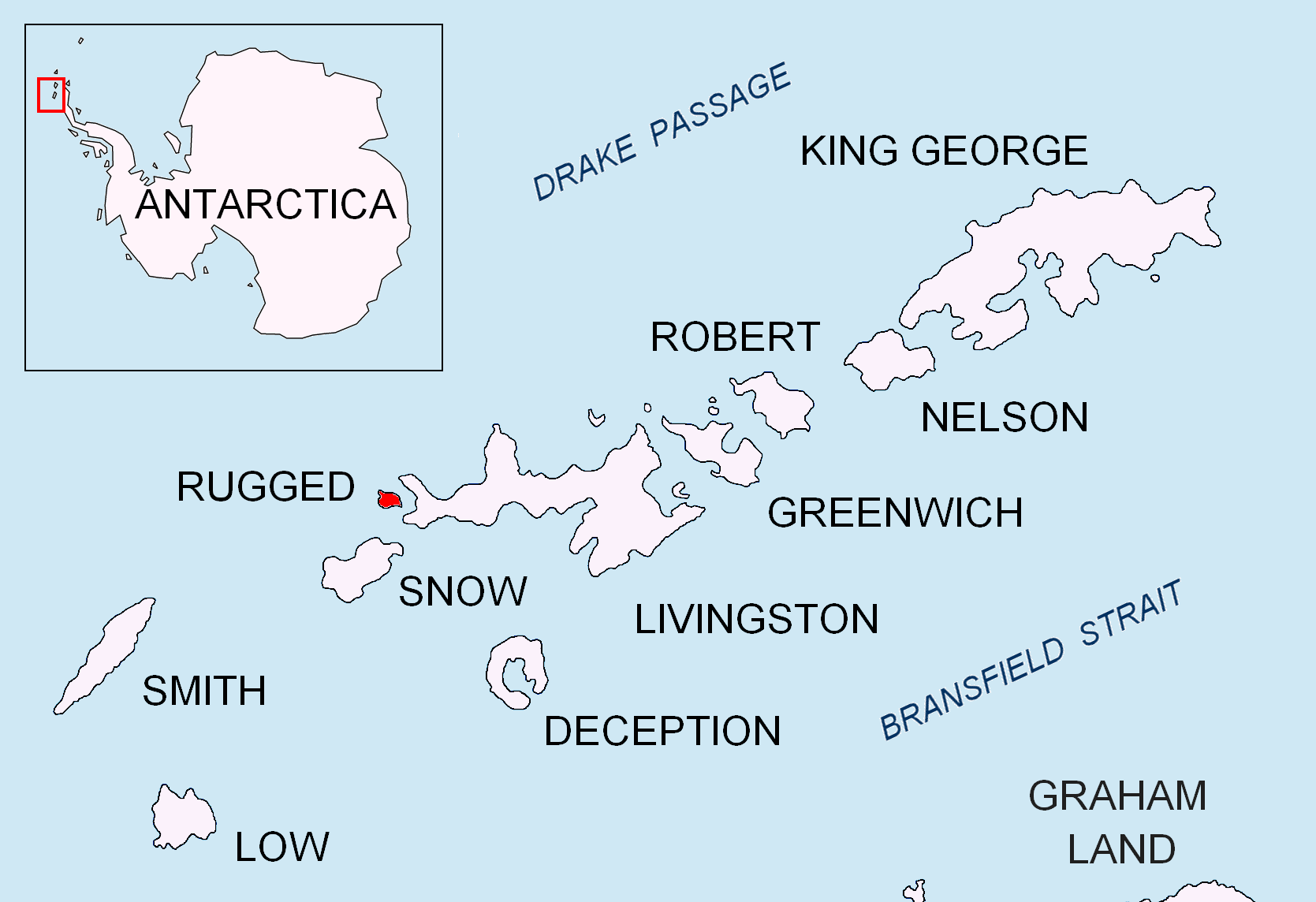
Location of Rugged Island in the South Shetland Islands.

Topographic map of Livingston Island, Greenwich, Robert, Snow and Smith Islands.

Cape Sheffield is a cape forming the northwest extremity of Rugged Island in the South Shetland Islands, Antarctica. It was named for Captain James P. Sheffield, Master of the brig Hersilia of Stonington, Connecticut, in 1819–20 and 1820–21, the first American sealer known to have visited the South Shetland Islands. In 1819–20 he took 8,868 sealskins from headquarters at Rugged Island.

== Location ==
The point is located at 62°36′49.5″S 61°18′02.9″W which is 6 km west-northwest of Vund Point, 3.2 km north by west of Benson Point and 5.15 km southwest of Start Point, Livingston Island. (British mapping in 1968, detailed Spanish mapping in 1992, and Bulgarian mapping in 2005 and 2009).

== Maps ==
- Península Byers, Isla Livingston. Mapa topográfico a escala 1:25000. Madrid: Servicio Geográfico del Ejército, 1992.
- L.L. Ivanov et al. Antarctica: Livingston Island and Greenwich Island, South Shetland Islands. Scale 1:100000 topographic map. Sofia: Antarctic Place-names Commission of Bulgaria, 2005.
- L.L. Ivanov. Antarctica: Livingston Island and Greenwich, Robert, Snow and Smith Islands. Scale 1:120000 topographic map. Troyan: Manfred Wörner Foundation, 2009. ISBN 978-954-92032-6-4
