= Rugged Island (South Shetland Islands) =

Antarctic island

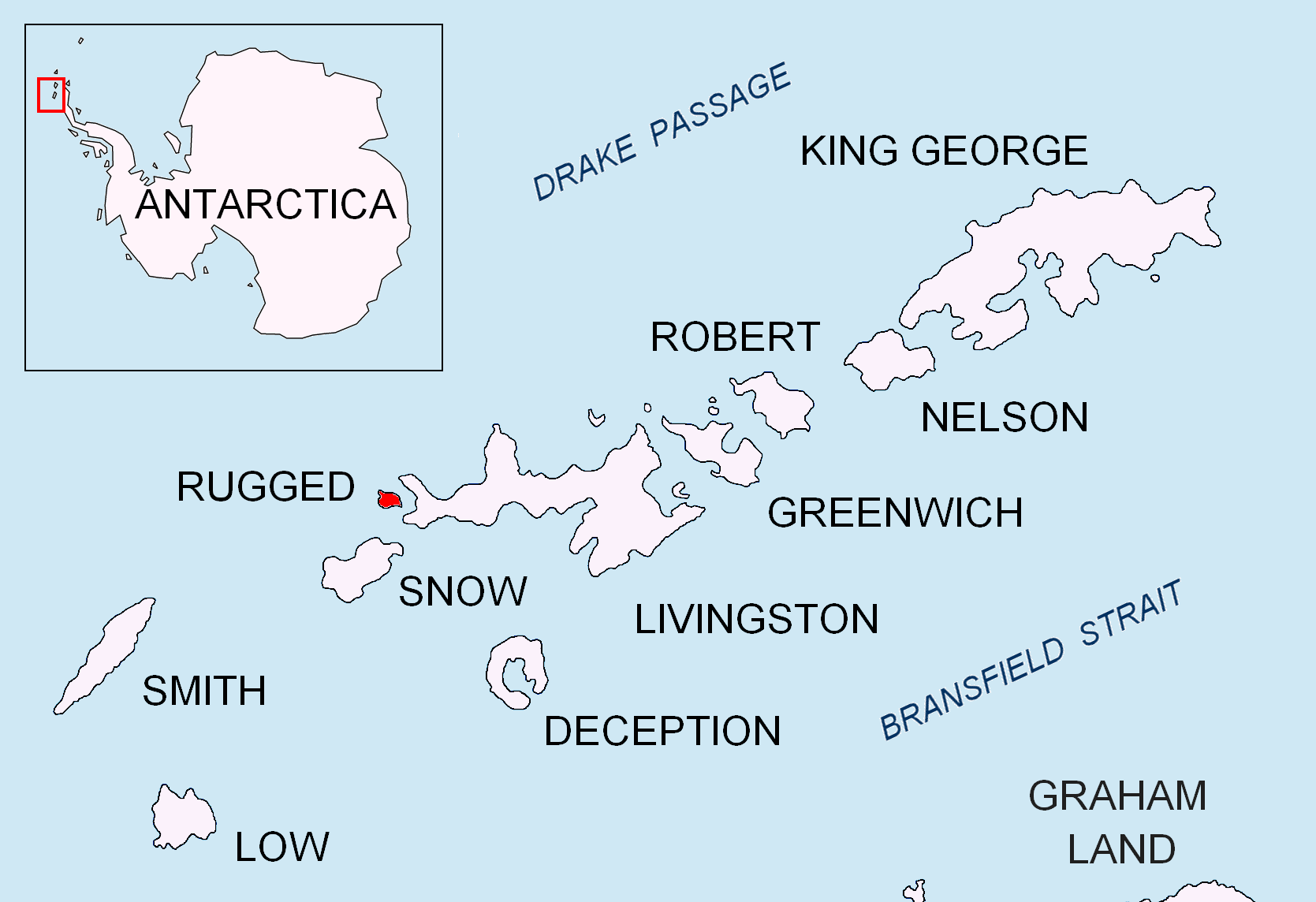
- Location of Rugged Island in the South Shetland Islands
- Interactive map of Rugged Island

Geography
- Location: Antarctica
- Coordinates: 62°38′S 61°15′W
- Archipelago: South Shetland Islands
- Area: 10.4 km^{2} (4.0 sq mi)
- Length: 3 mi (5 km)
- Width: 1 mi (2 km)

Administration
- Administered under the Antarctic Treaty System

Demographics
- Population: uninhabited

Map of Byers Peninsula featuring Rugged Island

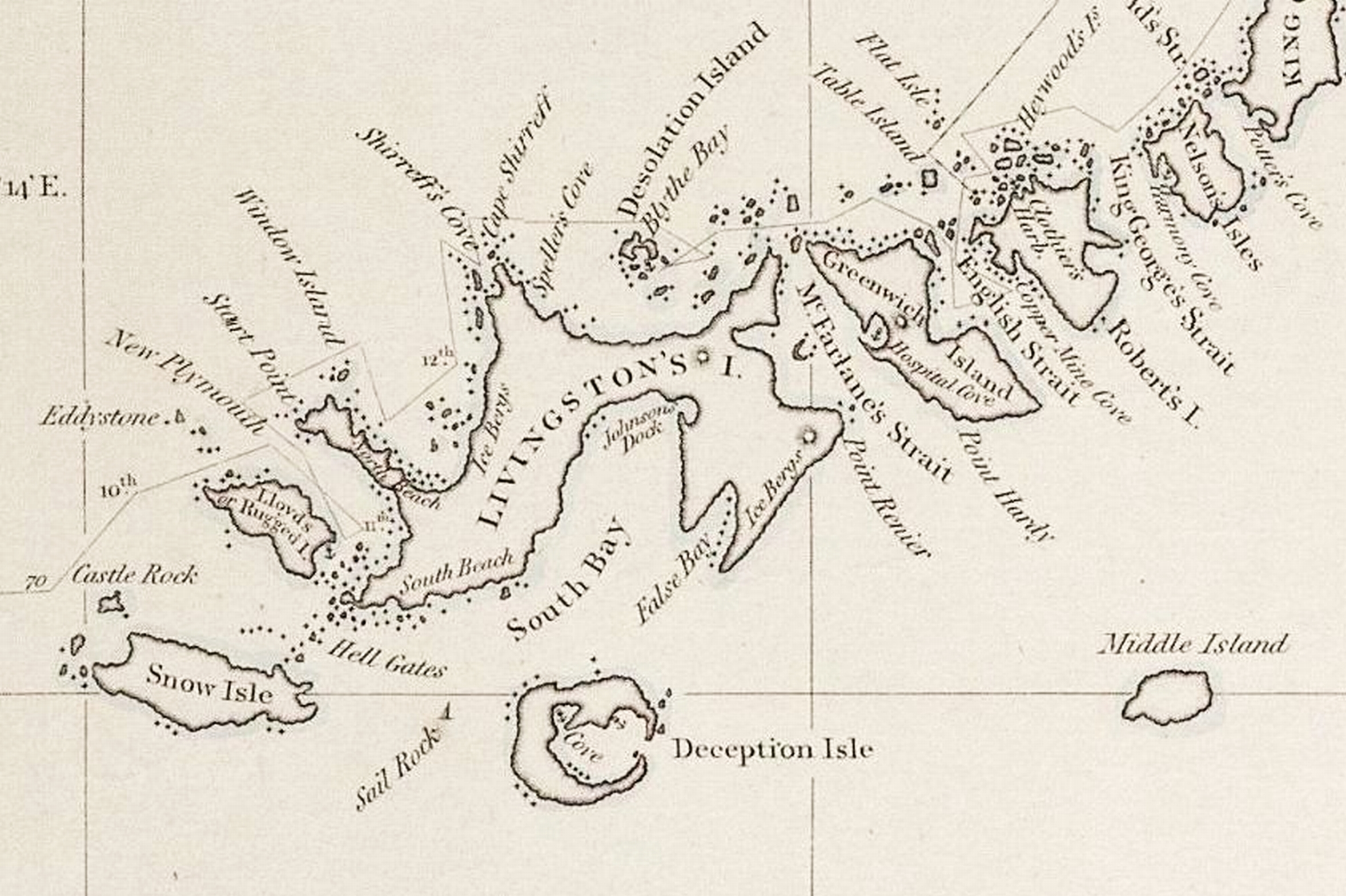
Fragment of George Powell's 1822 chart of the South Shetland Islands and South Orkney Islands featuring Rugged Island (as 'Lloyds or Rugged Island')

Topographic map of Livingston Island and Smith Island

Rugged Island (in Spanish Isla Rugosa, variant historical names Lloyds Island or Ragged Island) is an island 3 miles (4.8 km) long and 1 mile (1.6 km) wide, lying west of Livingston Island in the South Shetland Islands. Its surface area is 10.4 square kilometres (4.0 sq mi). The island's summit San Stefano Peak rises to 256 metres (840 ft) above sea level. Rugged Island is located at 62°38′S 61°15′W. Rugged Island was known to both American and British sealers as early as 1820, and the name has been well established in international usage for over 100 years.

== History ==
Rugged Island was first visited in 1819 by the sealing vessel Espirito Santo chartered by English merchants in Buenos Aires, and commanded by Captain Joseph Herring. The ship arrived at a bay on the north coast, known today as Hersilia Cove, where its English crew landed on Christmas Day 1819, and claimed the islands for King George III. The Espirito Santo was joined on 23 January 1820 by the American brig Hersilia commanded by Captain James Sheffield (with first mate Elof Benson and second mate Nathaniel Palmer), the first American sealer in the South Shetlands. A narrative of the events was published by Captain Herring in the July 1820 edition of the Imperial Magazine, London.

== See also ==
- Composite Antarctic Gazetteer
- List of Antarctic islands south of 60° S
- Livingston Island
- SCAR
- South Shetland Islands
- Territorial claims in Antarctica

== Maps ==
- Chart of South Shetland including Coronation Island, &c. from the exploration of the sloop Dove in the years 1821 and 1822 by George Powell Commander of the same. Scale ca. 1:200000. London: Laurie, 1822.
- South Shetland Islands. Scale 1:200000 topographic map No. 5657. DOS 610 – W 62 60. Tolworth, UK, 1968.
- Islas Livingston y Decepción. Mapa topográfico a escala 1:100000. Madrid: Servicio Geográfico del Ejército, 1991.
- Península Byers, Isla Livingston. Mapa topográfico a escala 1:25000. Madrid: Servicio Geográfico del Ejército, 1992. (Map image on p. 55 of the linked study)
- L.L. Ivanov et al. Antarctica: Livingston Island and Greenwich Island, South Shetland Islands. Scale 1:100000 topographic map. Sofia: Antarctic Place-names Commission of Bulgaria, 2005.
- L.L. Ivanov. Antarctica: Livingston Island and Greenwich, Robert, Snow and Smith Islands. Scale 1:120000 topographic map. Troyan: Manfred Wörner Foundation, 2009. ISBN 978-954-92032-6-4
- Antarctic Digital Database (ADD). Scale 1:250000 topographic map of Antarctica. Scientific Committee on Antarctic Research (SCAR). Since 1993, regularly upgraded and updated.
- L.L. Ivanov. Antarctica: Livingston Island and Smith Island. Scale 1:100000 topographic map. Manfred Wörner Foundation, 2017. ISBN 978-619-90008-3-0
