= Bulgarian toponyms in Antarctica (P) =

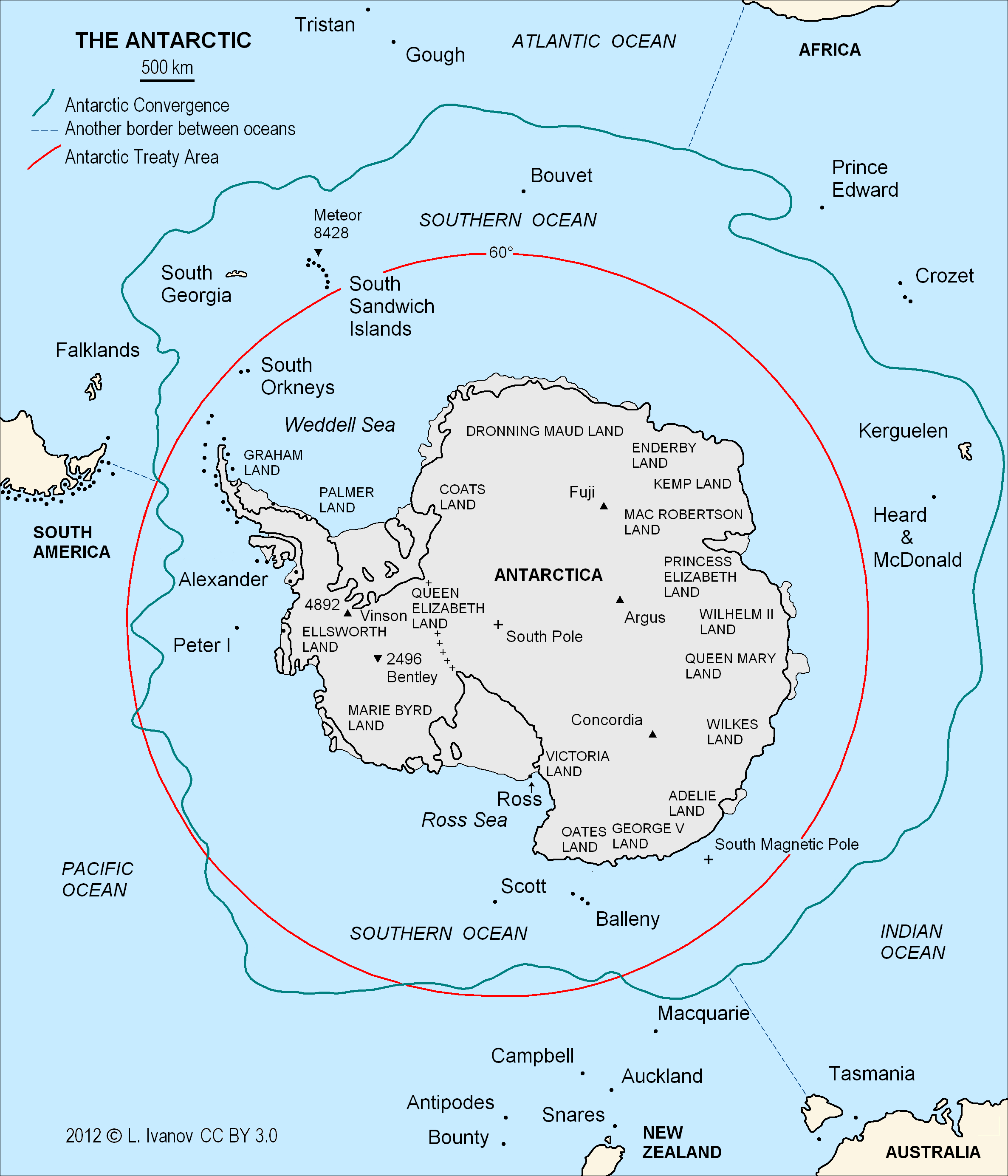
The South Polar Region.

- Padala Glacier, Sentinel Range
- Padesh Ridge, Oscar II Coast
- Padpadak Island, Wilhelm Archipelago
- Paisiy Peak, Livingston Island
- Pakusha Cove, Smith Island
- Palakariya Cove, Liège Island
- Palilula Glacier, Brabant Island
- Pamidovo Nunatak, Oscar II Coast
- Panagyurishte Nunatak, Greenwich Island
- Panega Glacier, Livingston Island
- Panicheri Gap, Sentinel Range
- Papazov Island, Astrolabe Island
- Papazov Passage, Biscoe Islands
- Papiya Nunatak, Nordenskjöld Coast
- Paprat Peak, Brabant Island
- Paramun Buttress, Nordenskjöld Coast
- Parangalitsa Peak, Sentinel Range
- Parchevich Ridge, Greenwich Island
- Paril Saddle, Livingston Island
- Parlichev Ridge, Oscar II Coast
- Paroriya Buttress, Alexander Island
- Parvomay Neck, Greenwich Island
- Pasarel Island, Aitcho Islands
- Pascin Point, Livingston Island
- Pashuk Glacier, Smith Island
- Paspal Glacier, Oscar II Coast
- Passy Peak, Livingston Island
- Pastra Glacier, Trinity Island
- Pastrogor Peak, Sentinel Range
- Pate Island, Wilhelm Archipelago
- Patleyna Glacier, Sentinel Range
- Patmos Peak, Bastien Range
- Patresh Rock, Robert Island
- Pautalia Glacier, Livingston Island
- Pavlikeni Point, Greenwich Island
- Pazardzhik Point, Snow Island
- Pegas Island, Wilhelm Archipelago
- Pelikan Island, Trinity Island
- Pelishat Point, Greenwich Island
- Penov Knoll, Smith Island
- Peperuda Island, Wilhelm Archipelago
- Perelik Point, Robert Island
- Peristera Peak, Sentinel Range
- Perivol Rock, Snow Island
- Perkos Dome, Danco Coast
- Pernik Peninsula, Loubet Coast
- Perperek Knoll, Livingston Island
- Mount Persenk, Nordenskjöld Coast
- Perunika Glacier, Livingston Island
- Peshev Ridge, Livingston Island
- Peshtera Glacier, Livingston Island
- Pesyakov Hill, Livingston Island
- Peter Peak, Livingston Island
- Petko Voyvoda Peak, Livingston Island
- Petkov Nunatak, Trinity Peninsula
- Petleshkov Hill, Astrolabe Island
- Petrelik Island, Anvers Island
- Petrich Peak, Livingston Island
- Petroff Point, Brabant Island
- Petrov Ridge, Danco Coast
- Petvar Heights, Sentinel Range
- Peychinov Crag, Oscar II Coast
- Peyna Glacier, Graham Coast
- Phanagoria Island, Zed Islands
- Pimpirev Beach, Livingston Island
- Pimpirev Glacier, Livingston Island
- Pindarev Island, Rugged Island
- Pingvin Rocks, Snow Island
- Piperkov Point, Elephant Island
- Pipkov Glacier, Alexander Island
- Pirdop Gate, Livingston Island
- Pirgos Peak, Oscar II Coast
- Pirin Glacier, Davis Coast
- Pirne Peak, Oscar II Coast
- Pirogov Glacier, Brabant Island
- Pisanitsa Island, Greenwich Island
- Pishtachev Peak, Danco Coast
- Pistiros Lake, Livingston Island
- Piyanets Ridge, Alexander Island
- Pizos Bay, Nordenskjöld Coast
- Plakuder Point, Pickwick Island
- Plana Peak, Livingston Island
- Plas Point, Graham Coast
- Platno Lake, Nelson Island
- Pleven Saddle, Livingston Island
- Pleystor Glacier, Liège Island
- Pliska Ridge, Livingston Island
- Ploski Cove, Tower Island
- Plovdiv Peak, Livingston Island
- Podayva Glacier, Brabant Island
- Podem Peak, Brabant Island
- Podgore Saddle, Sentinel Range
- Podgumer Col, Trinity Peninsula
- Poduene Glacier, Danco Coast
- Podvis Col, Davis Coast
- Pogledets Island, Livingston Island
- Poibrene Heights, Oscar II Coast
- Polanco Peak, Livingston Island
- Polezhan Point, Liège Island
- Polich Island, Astrolabe Island
- Pomorie Point, Livingston Island
- Ponor Saddle, Sentinel Range
- Mount Pontida, Alexander Island
- Mount Popov, Foyn Coast
- Popovo Saddle, Smith Island
- Pordim Islands, Robert Island
- Porlier Bay, Livingston Island
- Povien Bluff, Trinity Peninsula
- Predel Point, Anvers Island
- Preker Point, Trinity Island
- Prelez Gap, Trinity Peninsula
- Presian Ridge, Livingston Island
- Preslav Crag, Livingston Island
- Presnakov Island, Low Island
- Prespa Glacier, Livingston Island
- Prestoy Point, Graham Coast
- Priboy Rocks, Robert Island
- Prilep Knoll, Trinity Peninsula
- Príncipe de Asturias Peak, Vinson Massif
- Pripek Point, Graham Coast
- Pripor Nunatak, Alexander Island
- Prisad Island, Low Island
- Prisoe Cove, Livingston Island
- Probuda Ridge, Sentinel Range
- Progled Saddle, Sentinel Range
- Prosechen Island, Livingston Island
- Prosenik Peak, Sentinel Range
- Proteus Lake, Greenwich Island
- Provadiya Hook, Greenwich Island
- Pulpudeva Glacier, Sentinel Range
- Purmerul Peak, Loubet Coast

== See also ==
- Bulgarian toponyms in Antarctica

== Bibliography ==
- J. Stewart. Antarctica: An Encyclopedia. Jefferson, N.C. and London: McFarland, 2011. 1771 pp. ISBN 978-0-7864-3590-6
- L. Ivanov. Bulgarian Names in Antarctica. Sofia: Manfred Wörner Foundation, 2021. Second edition. 539 pp. ISBN 978-619-90008-5-4 (in Bulgarian)
- G. Bakardzhieva. Bulgarian toponyms in Antarctica. Paisiy Hilendarski University of Plovdiv: Research Papers. Vol. 56, Book 1, Part A, 2018 – Languages and Literature, pp. 104-119 (in Bulgarian)
- L. Ivanov and N. Ivanova. Bulgarian names. In: The World of Antarctica. Generis Publishing, 2022. pp. 114-115. ISBN 979-8-88676-403-1
