= Laager Point =

Location of Byers Peninsula, Livingston Island in the South Shetland Islands

Map of Antarctic Specially Protected Area ASPA 126 Byers Peninsula

Topographic map of Livingston Island and Smith Island

Laager Point is a conspicuous headland extending out from President Beaches on Byers Peninsula, Livingston Island in the South Shetland Islands, Antarctica facing Astor Island. It forms the southeast entrance point for New Plymouth harbour and the northeast entrance point for Osogovo Bay. Naiad Lake is situated on the southwest side of the point and Pistiros Lake is centred 900 m east of it. The area was visited by 19th century sealers.

The feature's name (meaning ‘Camp Point’) derives from an earlier Spanish form, ‘’Punta Campamento’’, given by Chilean researchers in 1971.

== Location ==
The point is located at 62°38′16.1″S 61°08′55.2″W which is 6.45 km south-southeast of Start Point, 3.28 km west of Chester Cone, 4.9 km northwest of Nikopol Point, 4.09 km north-northeast of Devils Point and 2.14 km east-southeast of Vund Point, Rugged Island (British mapping in 1968, detailed Spanish mapping in 1992, and Bulgarian mapping in 2005 and 2009).

== Maps ==
- Península Byers, Isla Livingston. Mapa topográfico a escala 1:25000. Madrid: Servicio Geográfico del Ejército, 1992.
- L.L. Ivanov et al. Antarctica: Livingston Island and Greenwich Island, South Shetland Islands. Scale 1:100000 topographic map. Sofia: Antarctic Place-names Commission of Bulgaria, 2005.
- L.L. Ivanov. Antarctica: Livingston Island and Greenwich, Robert, Snow and Smith Islands. Scale 1:120000 topographic map. Troyan: Manfred Wörner Foundation, 2009. ISBN 978-954-92032-6-4
- Antarctic Digital Database (ADD). Scale 1:250000 topographic map of Antarctica. Scientific Committee on Antarctic Research (SCAR). Since 1993, regularly upgraded and updated.
- L.L. Ivanov. Antarctica: Livingston Island and Smith Island. Scale 1:100000 topographic map. Manfred Wörner Foundation, 2017. ISBN 978-619-90008-3-0
