= Acheron Lake =

Antarctic lake

- езеро Ахерон (Bulgarian)
- Location of lake in the South Shetland Islands Acheron Lake (Antarctica)
- Interactive map of Acheron Lake
- Map of Antarctic Specially Protected Area ASPA 126 Byers Peninsula featuring Acheron Lake
- Location: Livingston Island, Antarctica
- Coordinates: 62°39′44″S 61°09′04″W
- Lake type: Glacial lake
- Basin countries: Antarctica
- Max. length: 315 metres (1,033 ft)
- Max. width: 186 metres (610 ft)
- Surface area: 4.4 hectares (11 acres)

Acheron Lake (Bulgarian: езеро Ахерон, romanized: ezero Aheron, IPA: [ˈɛzɛro ɐxɛˈrɔn]) is the B-shaped 315 metres (1,033 ft) long in southwest-northeast direction and 186 metres (610 ft) wide lake on President Beaches, Byers Peninsula on Livingston Island in the South Shetland Islands, Antarctica. It has a surface area of 4.4 hectares (11 acres), and is separated from Osogovo Bay waters by a 10 to 25 metres (33 to 82 ft) wide strip of land. Lucifer Crags surmount the lake on the southwest. The area was visited by early 19th century sealers.

The feature is named after Acheron River in Greek underworld.

== Location ==
Map of Livingston, Greenwich, Robert, Snow and Smith Islands

Acheron Lake is centred 1 kilometre (0.62 mi) south of Point Smellie, 1 kilometre (0.62 mi) west-northwest of Wasp Hill and 1.9 kilometres (1.2 mi) northeast of Devils Point and 1.4 kilometres (0.87 mi) north-northeast of Point Smellie. Detailed Spanish mapping in 1992, and Bulgarian mapping in 2009 and 2017.

== Maps ==
- Península Byers, Isla Livingston. Mapa topográfico a escala 1:25000. Madrid: Servicio Geográfico del Ejército, 1992
- L. Ivanov. Antarctica: Livingston Island and Greenwich, Robert, Snow and Smith Islands. Scale 1:120000 topographic map. Troyan: Manfred Wörner Foundation, 2009. ISBN 978-954-92032-6-4
- L. Ivanov. Antarctica: Livingston Island and Smith Island. Scale 1:100000 topographic map. Manfred Wörner Foundation, 2017. ISBN 978-619-90008-3-0
- Antarctic Digital Database (ADD). Scale 1:250000 topographic map of Antarctica. Scientific Committee on Antarctic Research (SCAR). Since 1993, regularly upgraded and updated

== See also ==
- Antarctic lakes
- Livingston Island
