= Pistiros Lake =

Antarctic lake

- Location within South Shetland Islands
- Location: Livingston Island, Antarctica
- Coordinates: 62°38′13″S 61°07′59″W
- Lake type: Glacial lake
- Max. length: 320 metres (1,050 ft)
- Max. width: 90 metres (300 ft)
- Surface area: 2.42 hectares (6.0 acres)

Map of Antarctic Specially Protected Area ASPA 126 Byers Peninsula featuring Pistiros Lake

Map of Livingston, Greenwich, Robert, Snow and Smith Islands

Pistiros Lake (Bulgarian: езеро Пистирос, romanized: ezero Pistiros, IPA: [ˈɛzɛro pisˈtiros]) is the slightly bent southwards rectangular lake, 320 m long in west-east direction and 90 m wide on President Beaches, Byers Peninsula on Livingston Island in the South Shetland Islands, Antarctica. It has a surface area of 2.42 ha, and is separated from the waters of New Plymouth by a 20 to 35 m wide strip of land. The area was visited by early 19th century sealers.

The feature is named after the ancient emporium of Pistiros in Southern Bulgaria.

== Location ==
Pistiros Lake is centred at 62°38′13″S 61°07′59″W which is 900 m east of Laager Point and 2.08 km south of Ocoa Point. Detailed Spanish mapping in 1992, and Bulgarian mapping in 2009 and 2017.

== Maps ==
- Península Byers, Isla Livingston. Mapa topográfico a escala 1:25000. Madrid: Servicio Geográfico del Ejército, 1992
- L. Ivanov. Antarctica: Livingston Island and Greenwich, Robert, Snow and Smith Islands. Scale 1:120000 topographic map. Troyan: Manfred Wörner Foundation, 2010. ISBN 978-954-92032-9-5 (First edition 2009. ISBN 978-954-92032-6-4)
- L. Ivanov. Antarctica: Livingston Island and Smith Island. Scale 1:100000 topographic map. Manfred Wörner Foundation, 2017. ISBN 978-619-90008-3-0
- Antarctic Digital Database (ADD). Scale 1:250000 topographic map of Antarctica. Scientific Committee on Antarctic Research (SCAR). Since 1993, regularly upgraded and updated

== See also ==
- Antarctic lakes
- Livingston Island
