= Naiad Lake =

Antarctic lake

- Location within South Shetland Islands
- Location: Livingston Island, Antarctica
- Coordinates: 62°38′25.4″S 61°08′34″W
- Lake type: Glacial lake
- Max. length: 230 metres (750 ft)
- Max. width: 150 metres (490 ft)
- Surface area: 2.98 hectares (7.4 acres)

Map of Antarctic Specially Protected Area ASPA 126 Byers Peninsula featuring Naiad Lake

Map of Livingston, Greenwich, Robert, Snow and Smith Islands

Naiad Lake (Bulgarian: езеро Наяда, romanized: ezero Nayada, IPA: [ˈɛzɛro nɐˈjadɐ]) is a lake on President Beaches, Byers Peninsula on Livingston Island in the South Shetland Islands, Antarctica. The lake is roughly rectangular in shape; it is 230 m-long (250 yd) and 150 m-wide (160 yd), oriented in a south-north direction. It has a surface area of 2.98 ha (7.4 acres), and is separated from Osogovo Bay waters by a 12-to-90 m-wide (10-to-100 yd) strip of land. The area was visited by early 19th century sealers.

The feature is named after the Naiads, nymphs of springs, streams, rivers, and lakes in Greek mythology.

== Location ==
Naiad Lake is situated on the southwest side of Laager Point and centred at 62°38′25.4″S 61°08′34″W, which is 1.4 km (1 mi) north-northeast of Point Smellie. Detailed Spanish mapping in 1992, and Bulgarian mapping in 2009 and 2017.

== Maps ==
- Península Byers, Isla Livingston. Mapa topográfico a escala 1:25000. Madrid: Servicio Geográfico del Ejército, 1992
- L. Ivanov. Antarctica: Livingston Island and Greenwich, Robert, Snow and Smith Islands. Scale 1:120000 topographic map. Troyan: Manfred Wörner Foundation, 2009. ISBN 978-954-92032-6-4
- L. Ivanov. Antarctica: Livingston Island and Smith Island. Scale 1:100000 topographic map. Manfred Wörner Foundation, 2017. ISBN 978-619-90008-3-0
- Antarctic Digital Database (ADD). Scale 1:250000 topographic map of Antarctica. Scientific Committee on Antarctic Research (SCAR). Since 1993, regularly upgraded and updated

== See also ==
- Antarctic lakes
- Livingston Island
