= Long Rock, Livingston Island =

Island in the South Shetland Islands

Long Rock
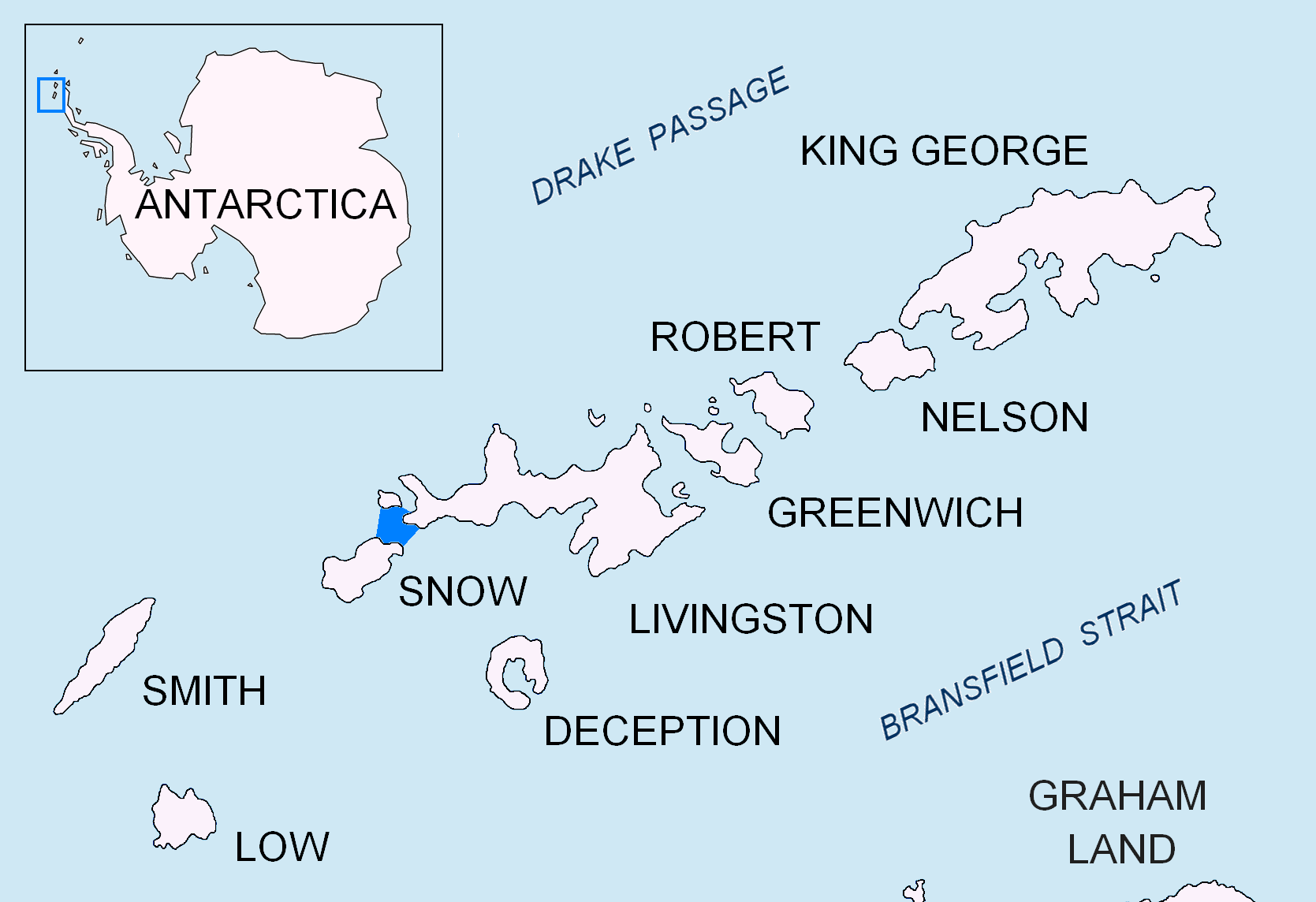
- Location of Morton Strait in the South Shetland Islands
- Interactive map of Long Rock

Geography
- Location: Antarctica
- Coordinates: 62°42′S 61°11′W
- Archipelago: South Shetland Islands
- Length: 0.72 km (0.447 mi)
- Width: 0.18 km (0.112 mi)
- Highest elevation: 13 m (43 ft)

Administration
- Administered under the Antarctic Treaty System

Demographics
- Population: Uninhabited

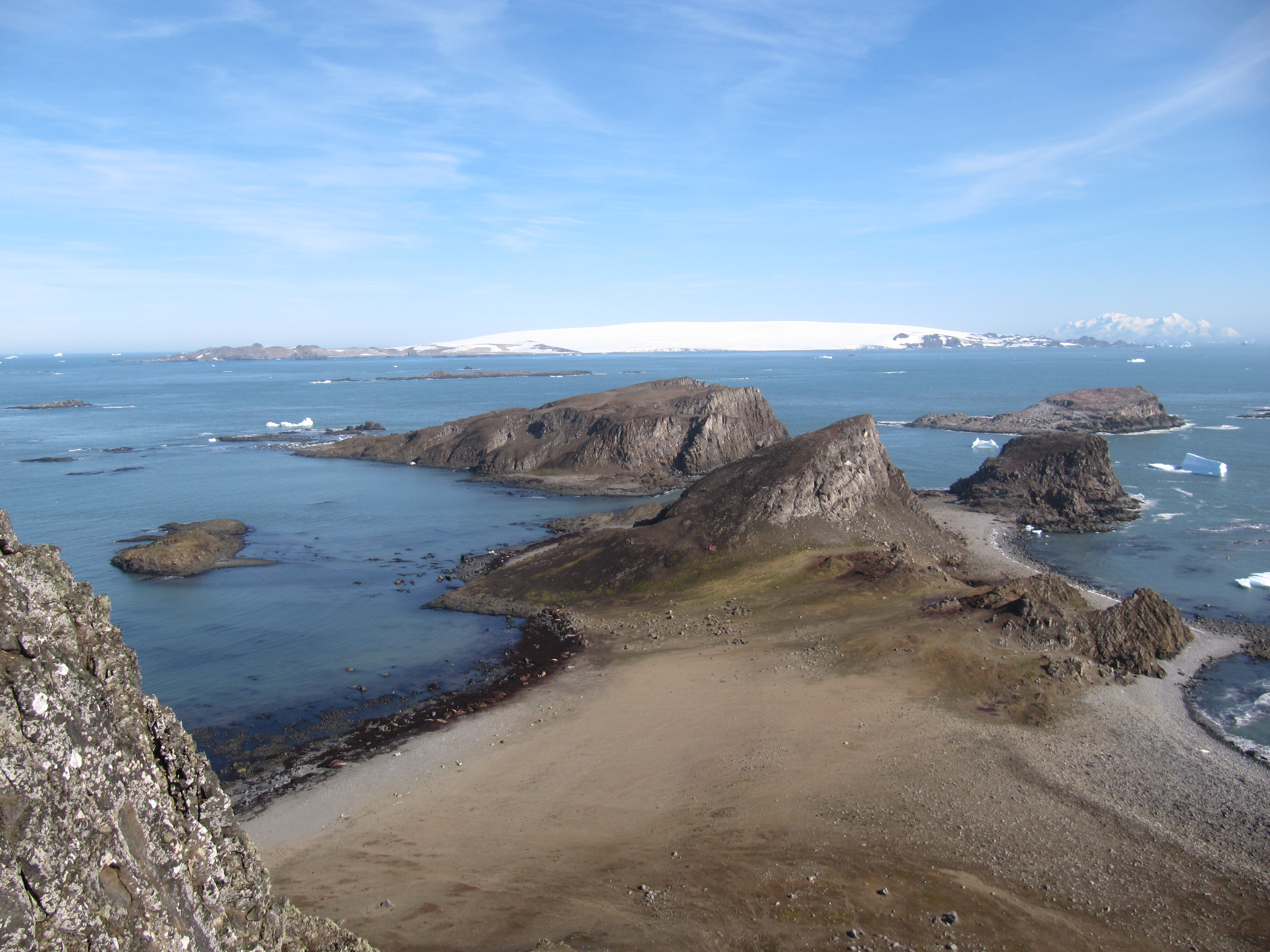
Devils Point from Lucifer Crags, with Hell Gates and Vardim Rocks in the middle ground, Long Rock in Morton Strait and Snow Island in the background, and Smith Island seen on the horizon on the right

Topographic map of Livingston Island, Greenwich, Robert, Snow and Smith Islands

Long Rock is a large rock extending 720 m (787 yd) in east–west direction, 180 m (197 yd) wide and rising to 13 m (42.7 ft) in the northeast of Morton Strait in the South Shetland Islands, Antarctica. The area was visited by early 19th century sealers operating on Byers Peninsula.

The feature was named by Discovery Investigations personnel that charted Morton Strait in 1930–31.

== Location ==
The rock is located 1.6 km (0.99 mi) south-southwest of Vardim Rocks, 2.1 km (1.30 mi) south-southwest of Devils Point, 4.2 km (2.61 mi) north of President Head, Snow Island, 7 km (4.35 mi) east-northeast of Cape Timblón, Snow Island and 6.93 km (4.31 mi) southeast of Benson Point, Rugged Island (British mapping in 1933 and 1968, Argentine in 1946 and 1953, Chilean in 1947 and 1971, French in 1951, detailed Spanish mapping in 1992, and Bulgarian mapping in 2005 and 2009).

== See also ==
- Composite Antarctic Gazetteer
- List of Antarctic islands south of 60° S
- SCAR
- Territorial claims in Antarctica

== Maps ==
- Península Byers, Isla Livingston. Mapa topográfico a escala 1:25000. Madrid: Servicio Geográfico del Ejército, 1992.
- L.L. Ivanov et al. Antarctica: Livingston Island and Greenwich Island, South Shetland Islands. Scale 1:100000 topographic map. Sofia: Antarctic Place-names Commission of Bulgaria, 2005.
- L.L. Ivanov. Antarctica: Livingston Island and Greenwich, Robert, Snow and Smith Islands. Scale 1:120000 topographic map. Troyan: Manfred Wörner Foundation, 2009. ISBN 978-954-92032-6-4
