= Stewart Stacks =

Sea stacks in Antarctica

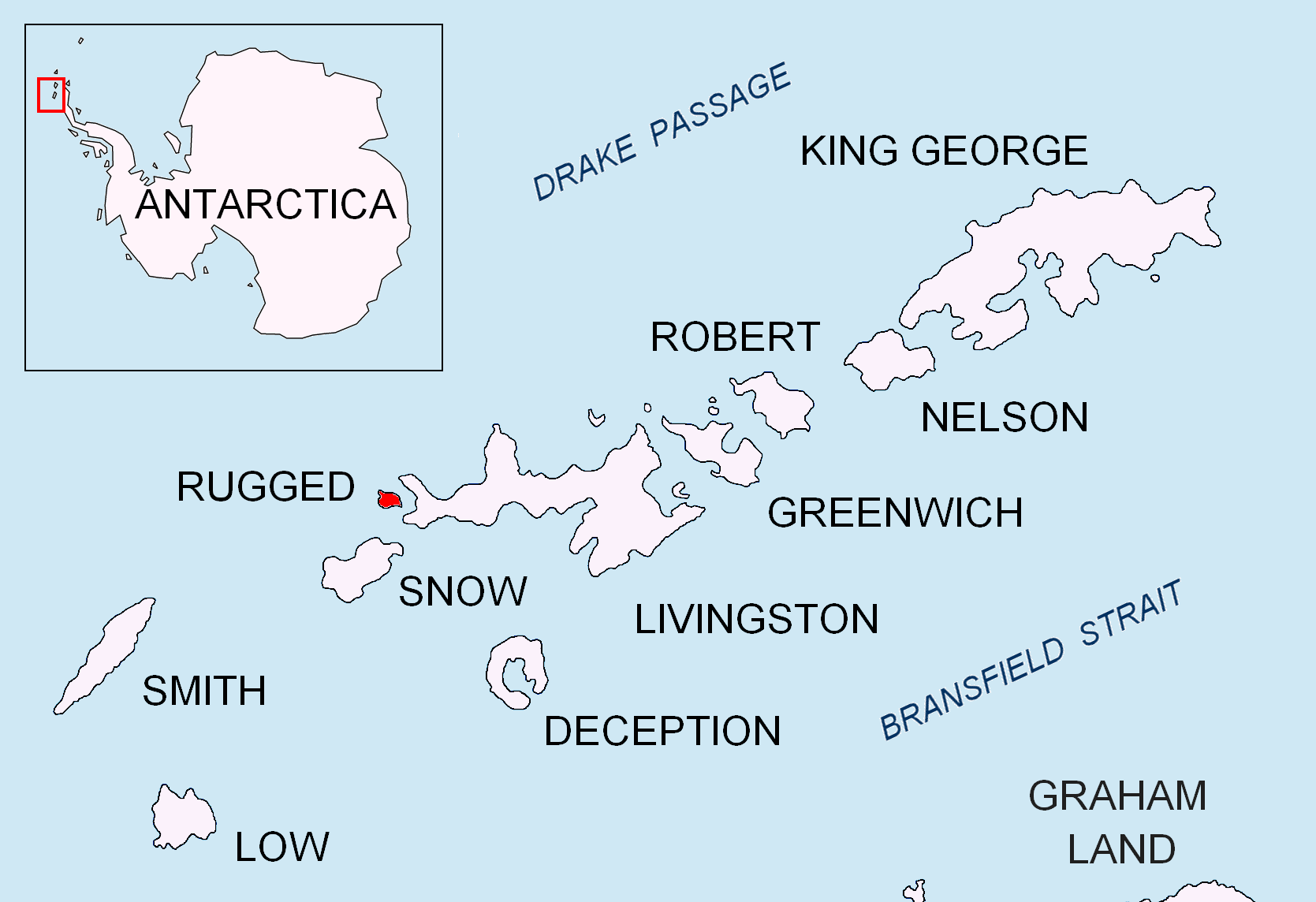
Location of Rugged Island in the South Shetland Islands.

Topographic map of Livingston Island, Greenwich, Robert, Snow and Smith Islands.

Stewart Stacks is a group of prominent sea stacks, one of them rising to 25 m, lying between Rugged Island and Astor Island in the northeast of Osogovo Bay, western Livingston Island in the South Shetland Islands, Antarctica. The area was visited by early 19th century sealers.

The feature is named after Hampton Stewart of the American sealing vessel Jane Maria under Captain Robert Johnson who, according to the New York Gazette and General Advertiser of 16 May 1821, made one of the first charts of the South Shetlands in 1820–21.

== Location ==
The stacks are centred at 62°38′26.7″S 61°11′11″W which is 800 m east-southeast of Radev Point, Rugged Island, 600 m southwest of Astor Island, 2.09 km northwest of Point Smellie, Livingston Island and 3.4 km north by west of Devils Point, Livingston Island (British mapping in 1821 and 1968, detailed Spanish mapping in 1992, and Bulgarian mapping in 2009).

== Maps ==
- Península Byers, Isla Livingston. Mapa topográfico a escala 1:25000. Madrid: Servicio Geográfico del Ejército, 1992.
- L.L. Ivanov. Antarctica: Livingston Island and Greenwich, Robert, Snow and Smith Islands. Scale 1:120000 topographic map. Troyan: Manfred Wörner Foundation, 2009. ISBN 978-954-92032-6-4
