= Siren Lake =

Antarctic lake

- Location within South Shetland Islands
- Location: Livingston Island, Antarctica
- Coordinates: 62°40′08″S 61°08′53″W
- Lake type: Glacial lake
- Max. length: 250 metres (820 ft)
- Max. width: 140 metres (460 ft)
- Surface area: 2.7 hectares (6.7 acres)

Map of Antarctic Specially Protected Area ASPA 126 Byers Peninsula featuring Siren Lake

Map of Livingston, Greenwich, Robert, Snow and Smith Islands

Siren Lake (Bulgarian: езеро Сирена, romanized: ezero Sirena, IPA: [ˈɛzɛro siˈrɛnɐ]) is the oval-shaped 250 m long in southeast-northwest direction and 140 m wide lake near the west extremity of South Beaches on Byers Peninsula, Livingston Island in the South Shetland Islands, Antarctica. It has a surface area of 2.7 ha and is separated from Raskuporis Cove waters by a 55 to 70 m wide strip of land. The area was visited by early 19th century sealers.

The feature is named after the Siren nymphs of Greek mythology.

== Location ==
Siren Lake is centred at 62°40′08″S 61°08′53″W, which is 1.8 km east of Devils Point, 800 m east-southeast of Lucifer Crags, 1 km southwest of Wasp Hill and 680 m north of Sevar Point. Detailed Spanish mapping in 1992, and Bulgarian mapping in 2009 and 2017.

== Maps ==
- Península Byers, Isla Livingston. Mapa topográfico a escala 1:25000. Madrid: Servicio Geográfico del Ejército, 1992
- L. Ivanov. Antarctica: Livingston Island and Greenwich, Robert, Snow and Smith Islands. Scale 1:120000 topographic map. Troyan: Manfred Wörner Foundation, 2009. ISBN 978-954-92032-6-4
- L. Ivanov. Antarctica: Livingston Island and Smith Island. Scale 1:100000 topographic map. Manfred Wörner Foundation, 2017. ISBN 978-619-90008-3-0
- Antarctic Digital Database (ADD). Scale 1:250000 topographic map of Antarctica. Scientific Committee on Antarctic Research (SCAR). Since 1993, regularly upgraded and updated

== See also ==
- Antarctic lakes
- Livingston Island
