= Pingvin Rocks =

Rocks in Antarctica

- Map of Livingston Island featuring Pingvin Rocks

- Location within Antarctica Location within Antarctic Peninsula

Geography
- Location: Antarctica
- Coordinates: 62°43′05″S 61°13′57″W
- Archipelago: South Shetland Islands
- Length: 670 m (2200 ft)
- Width: 300 m (1000 ft)

Administration
- Antarctica
- Administered under the Antarctic Treaty System

Demographics
- Population: uninhabited

Pingvin Rocks (Bulgarian: скали Пингвин, ‘Skali Pingvin’ \ska-'li ping-'vin\) is the group of rocks in Morton Strait off the northeast coast of Snow Island in the South Shetland Islands, Antarctica extending 670 m in west–east direction and 300 m in south–north direction. The area was visited by early 19th-century sealers.

The rocks are “named after the ocean fishing trawler Pingvin of the Bulgarian company Ocean Fisheries – Burgas whose ships operated in the waters of South Georgia, Kerguelen, the South Orkney Islands, South Shetland Islands and Antarctic Peninsula from 1970 to the early 1990s. The Bulgarian fishermen, along with those of the Soviet Union, Poland and East Germany are the pioneers of modern Antarctic fishing industry.” "Pingvin" means "penguin" in Bulgarian.

== Location ==
Pingvin Rocks are centred at 62°43′05″S 61°13′57″W, which is 1.7 km northwest of the northeast of President Head, 1 km northeast of Karposh Point and 5.8 km south-southwest of Devils Point on Livingston Island. Bulgarian mapping in 2018.

== Maps ==
- L.L. Ivanov. Antarctica: Livingston Island and Smith Island. Scale 1:100000 topographic map. Manfred Wörner Foundation, 2017; updated 2018.
- Antarctic Digital Database (ADD). Scale 1:250000 topographic map of Antarctica. Scientific Committee on Antarctic Research (SCAR). Since 1993, regularly upgraded and updated.
