= Hell Gates =

Narrow passage in the South Shetland Islands

Location of Byers Peninsula on Livingston Island in the South Shetland Islands

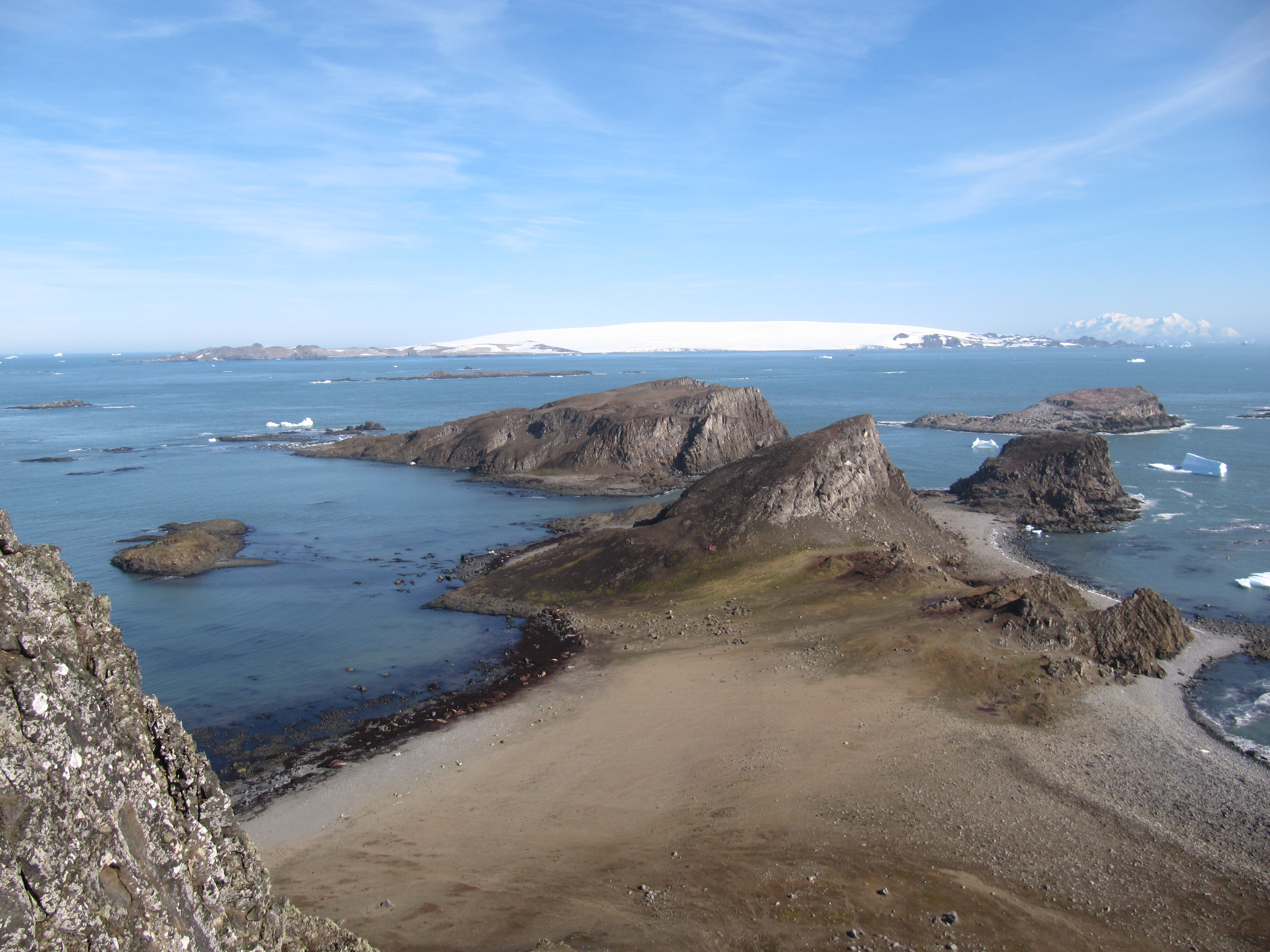
Devils Point from Lucifer Crags, with Hell Gates and Vardim Rocks in the middle ground, Long Rock in Morton Strait and Snow Island in the background, and Smith Island seen on the horizon on the right

Topographic map of Livingston Island, Greenwich, Robert, Snow and Smith Islands

Hell Gates (62°40′20.3″S 61°10′46.4″W) is a narrow (20 m wide) boat passage between the Vardim Rocks and Devils Point on Byers Peninsula, connecting Raskuporis Cove and Osogovo Bay at the southwest end of Livingston Island in the South Shetland Islands, Antarctica. The name dates back to about 1821 and was applied by early sealers in the area because many lives and ships were lost here.

== Maps ==
- Península Byers, Isla Livingston. Mapa topográfico a escala 1:25000. Madrid: Servicio Geográfico del Ejército, 1992.
- L.L. Ivanov et al., Antarctica: Livingston Island and Greenwich Island, South Shetland Islands (from English Strait to Morton Strait, with illustrations and ice-cover distribution), 1:100000 scale topographic map, Antarctic Place-names Commission of Bulgaria, Sofia, 2005
- L.L. Ivanov. Antarctica: Livingston Island and Greenwich, Robert, Snow and Smith Islands. Scale 1:120000 topographic map. Troyan: Manfred Wörner Foundation, 2009. ISBN 978-954-92032-6-4
