= Aim Rocks =

Group of rocks in the South Shetland Islands, Antarctica

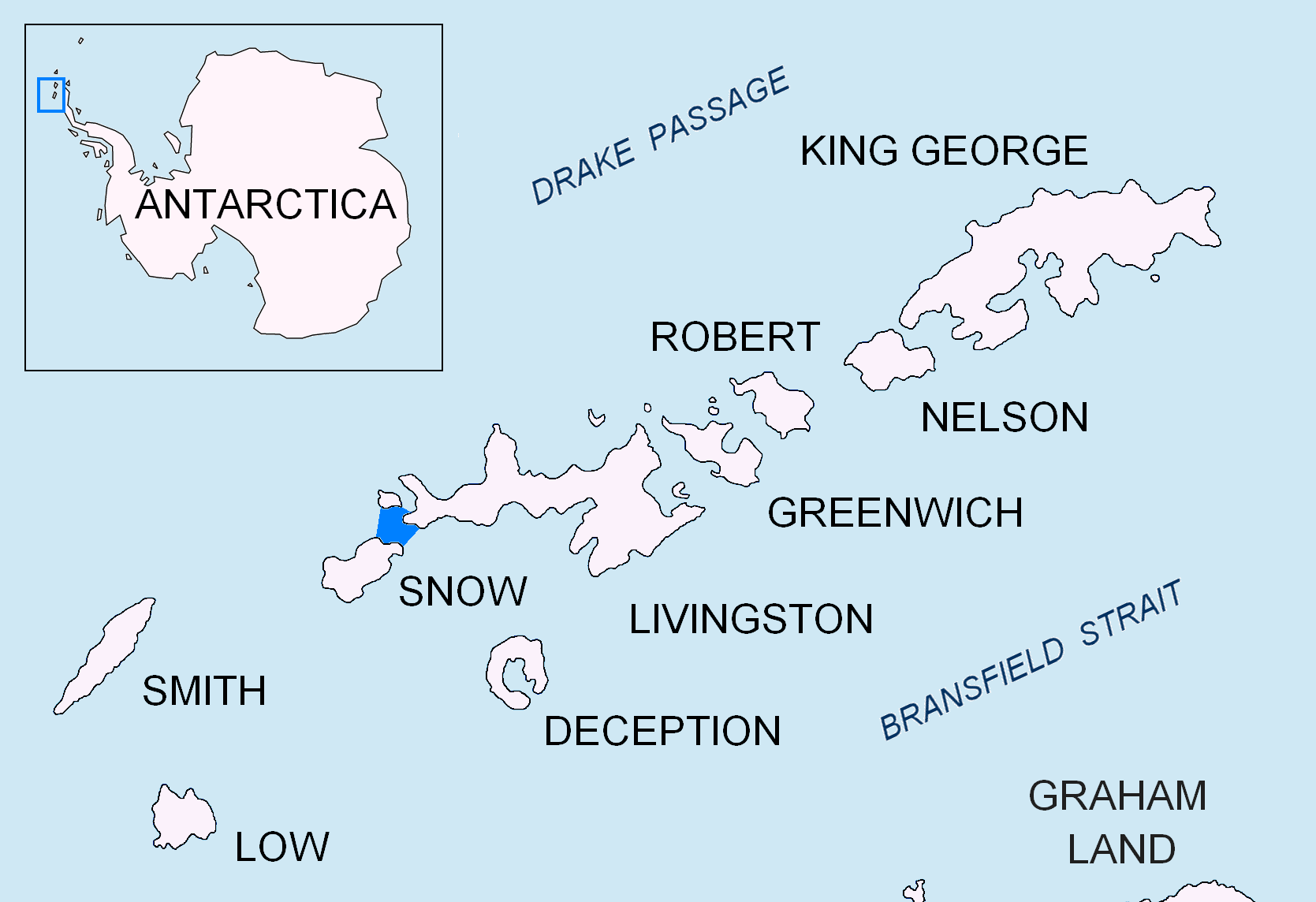
- Location of Morton Strait in the South Shetland Islands.

- Location within Antarctica Location within Antarctic Peninsula

Geography
- Location: Antarctica
- Coordinates: 62°41′43.6″S 61°15′50.6″W

Administration
- Administered under the Antarctic Treaty System

Demographics
- Population: Uninhabited

Aim Rocks is a group of rocks lying east of Cape Timblón in the middle of Morton Strait in the South Shetland Islands, Antarctica. The name, given by the United Kingdom Antarctic Place-Names Committee in 1961, is descriptive; These rocks in a line are a guide for safe passage through the southern entrance of Morton Strait.

== See also ==
- List of Antarctic and subantarctic islands

== Maps ==
- L.L. Ivanov et al. Antarctica: Livingston Island and Greenwich Island, South Shetland Islands. Scale 1:100000 topographic map. Sofia: Antarctic Place-names Commission of Bulgaria, 2005.
- L.L. Ivanov. Antarctica: Livingston Island and Greenwich, Robert, Snow and Smith Islands. Scale 1:120000 topographic map. Troyan: Manfred Wörner Foundation, 2009. ISBN 978-954-92032-6-4
