= Perivol Rock =

Geographical Feature

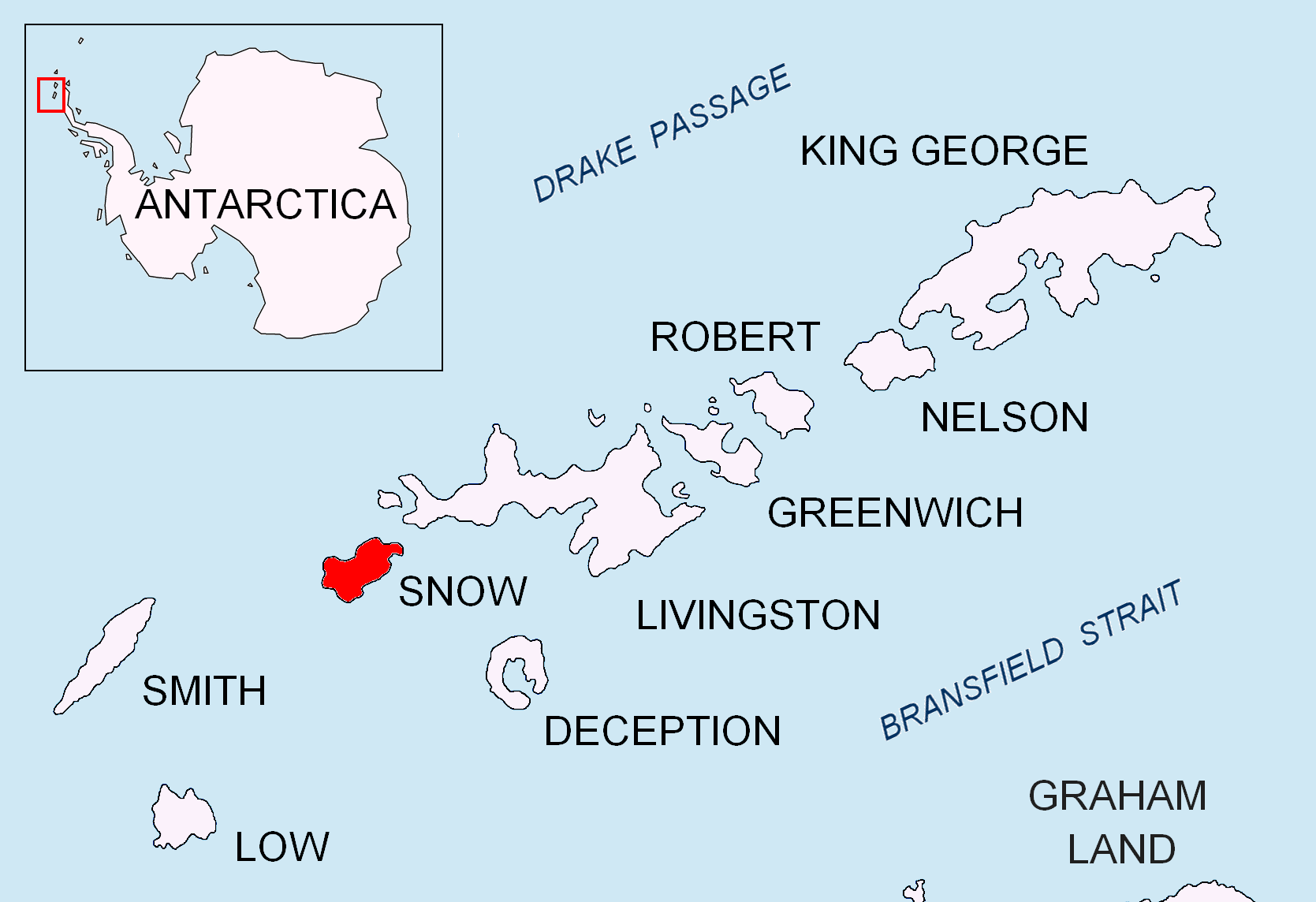
- Location of Snow Island in the South Shetland Islands

- Location within Antarctica Location within Antarctic Peninsula

Geography
- Location: Antarctica
- Coordinates: 62°42′02″S 61°20′52″W
- Length: 230 m (750 ft)
- Width: 170 m (560 ft)

Administration
- Administered under the Antarctic Treaty System

Demographics
- Population: Uninhabited

Perivol Rock (Bulgarian: скала Перивол, ‘Skala Perivol’ \ska-'la pe-ri-'vol\) is the rock off Snow Island in the South Shetland Islands, Antarctica, extending 230 m in a southeast–northwest direction and 170 m wide.

The feature is named after the settlement of Perivol in western Bulgaria.

== Location ==
Perivol Rock is located 750 m northwest of Cape Timblón and 1.28 km north-northeast of Mezdra Point. British mapping in 1968, and Bulgarian mapping in 2005 and 2009.

== See also ==
- List of Antarctic and sub-Antarctic islands
- South Shetland Islands

== Maps ==
- L.L. Ivanov. Antarctica: Livingston Island and Greenwich, Robert, Snow and Smith Islands. Scale 1:120000 topographic map. Troyan: Manfred Wörner Foundation, 2009. ISBN 978-954-92032-6-4 (Updated second edition 2010. ISBN 978-954-92032-9-5)
- Antarctic Digital Database (ADD). Scale 1:250000 topographic map of Antarctica. Scientific Committee on Antarctic Research (SCAR). Since 1993, regularly upgraded and updated.
