= Pazardzhik Point =

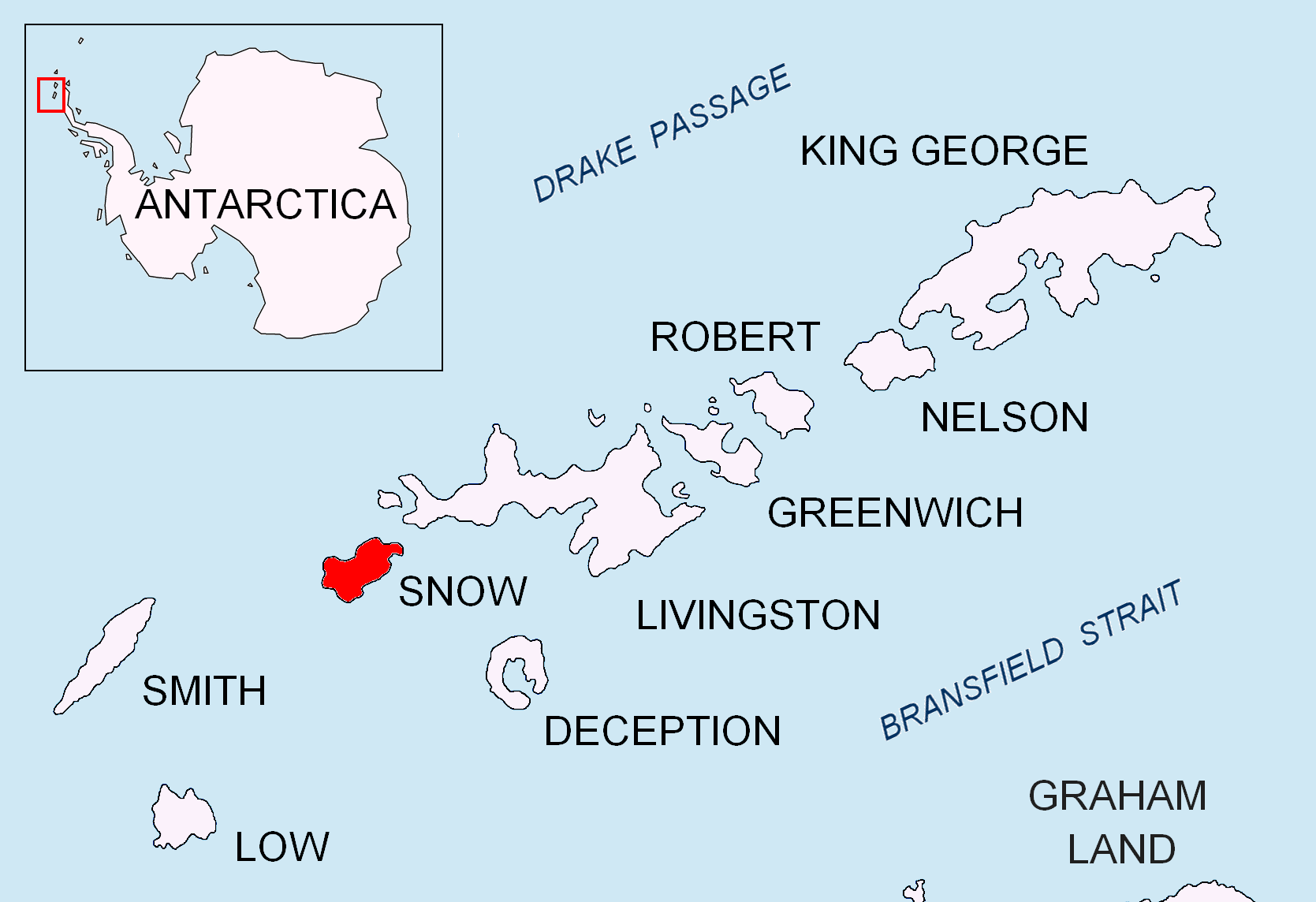
Location of Snow Island in the South Shetland Islands.

Topographic map of Livingston Island, Greenwich, Robert, Snow and Smith Islands.

Pazardzhik Point (Bulgarian: нос Пазарджик, ‘Nos Pazardzhik’ \'nos 'pa-zar-dzhik\) is a point on the southeast coast of Snow Island in the South Shetland Islands, Antarctica situated 2.1 km east-northeast of Cape Conway and 9.9 km southwest of Hall Peninsula. Snow-free in summer.

The point is named after the city of Pazardzhik in southern Bulgaria.

== Location ==
Pazardzhik Point is located at 62°50′07″S 61°23′24″W. Bulgarian mapping in 2009.

== Map ==
- L.L. Ivanov. Antarctica: Livingston Island and Greenwich, Robert, Snow and Smith Islands. Scale 1:120000 topographic map. Troyan: Manfred Wörner Foundation, 2009. ISBN 978-954-92032-6-4
