= Raskuporis Cove =

Location of Byers Peninsula on Livingston Island in the South Shetland Islands.

Topographic map of Livingston Island, Greenwich, Robert, Snow and Smith Islands.

Raskuporis Cove (Bulgarian: залив Раскупорис, romanized: zaliv Raskuporis, IPA: [ˈzalif rɐskoˈpɔris]) is the 1.77 km wide cove indenting for 700 m the south coast of Byers Peninsula on Livingston Island in the South Shetland Islands, Antarctica. Entered west of Sevar Point and east of Devils Point, and connected to Osogovo Bay to the northwest by the 20 m wide passage of Hell Gates.

The cove is named after King Raskuporis of Thrace, 48-42 BC.

== Location ==
Raskuporis Cove is located at 62°40′25″S 61°09′43″W. British mapping in 1968, Spanish in 1993 and Bulgarian in 2009.

== Maps ==
- Península Byers, Isla Livingston. Mapa topográfico a escala 1:25000. Madrid: Servicio Geográfico del Ejército, 1992.
- L.L. Ivanov. Antarctica: Livingston Island and Greenwich, Robert, Snow and Smith Islands. Scale 1:120000 topographic map. Troyan: Manfred Wörner Foundation, 2009. ISBN 978-954-92032-6-4
