= Vardim Rocks =

Group of rocks in the South Shetland Islands, Antarctica

- Location of Byers Peninsula, Livingston Island in the South Shetland Islands
- Interactive map of Vardim Rocks

Geography
- Location: Antarctica
- Coordinates: 62°40′28″S 61°11′00″W
- Archipelago: South Shetland Islands

Administration
- Administered under the Antarctic Treaty System

Demographics
- Population: Uninhabited

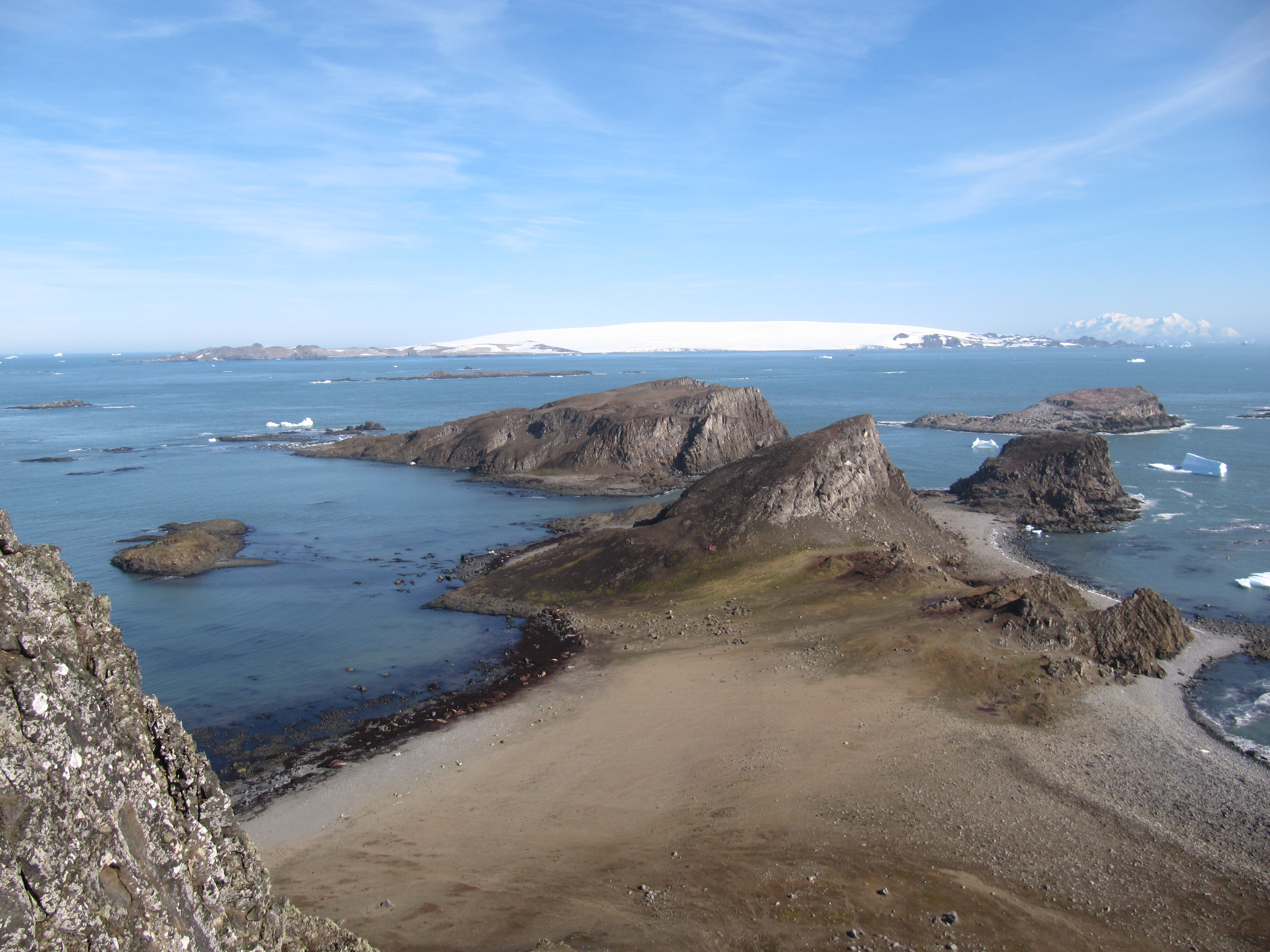
Devils Point from Lucifer Crags, with Hell Gates and Vardim Rocks in the middle ground, Long Rock in Morton Strait and Snow Island in the background, and Smith Island seen on the right horizon

Map of Antarctic Specially Protected Area ASPA 126 Byers Peninsula featuring Vardim Rocks

Topographic map of Livingston Island

Vardim Rocks (Bulgarian: скали Вардим, ‘Skali Vardim’ ska-'li 'var-dim) are a group of rocks situated on the south side of Hell Gates, facing Devils Point in the southwest extremity of Byers Peninsula on Livingston Island in the South Shetland Islands, Antarctica. Extending 1.3 km (0.81 mi) in east-west direction. The two principal islets in the group, Demon and Sprite, are extending 420 by 400 m (460 by 440 yd) and 270 by 150 m (300 by 160 yd) respectively, with surface area of the former 9 hectares (22 acres). The area was visited by early 19th century sealers.

The group includes the small islands of Demon (62°40′26″S 61°10′55″W), Sprite (62°40′23″S 61°11′31″W), and Imp (62°40′20″S 61°12′00″W).

The rocks are named after the village of Vardim and the neighboring Vardim Island which is located on the Danube River in northern Bulgaria. Demon, Sprite and Imp islands are so named to reflect their proximity to Devils Point.

== Location ==
Vardim Rocks are located at 62°40′28″S 61°11′00″W (British mapping in 1968, detailed Spanish mapping in 1992, and Bulgarian mapping in 2005, 2009 and 2010.

== Maps ==
- Península Byers, Isla Livingston. Mapa topográfico a escala 1:25000. Madrid: Servicio Geográfico del Ejército, 1992.
- L.L. Ivanov. Antarctica: Livingston Island and Greenwich, Robert, Snow and Smith Islands. Scale 1:120000 topographic map. Troyan: Manfred Wörner Foundation, 2010. ISBN 978-954-92032-9-5 (First edition 2009. ISBN 978-954-92032-6-4)
- Antarctic Digital Database (ADD). Scale 1:250000 topographic map of Antarctica. Scientific Committee on Antarctic Research (SCAR). Since 1993, regularly upgraded and updated.
- L.L. Ivanov. Antarctica: Livingston Island and Smith Island. Scale 1:100000 topographic map. Manfred Wörner Foundation, 2017. ISBN 978-619-90008-3-0

== See also ==
- Composite Antarctic Gazetteer
- List of Antarctic islands south of 60° S
- SCAR
- Territorial claims in Antarctica
