= Cape Timblón =

Rocky cape in the South Shetland Islands, Antarctica

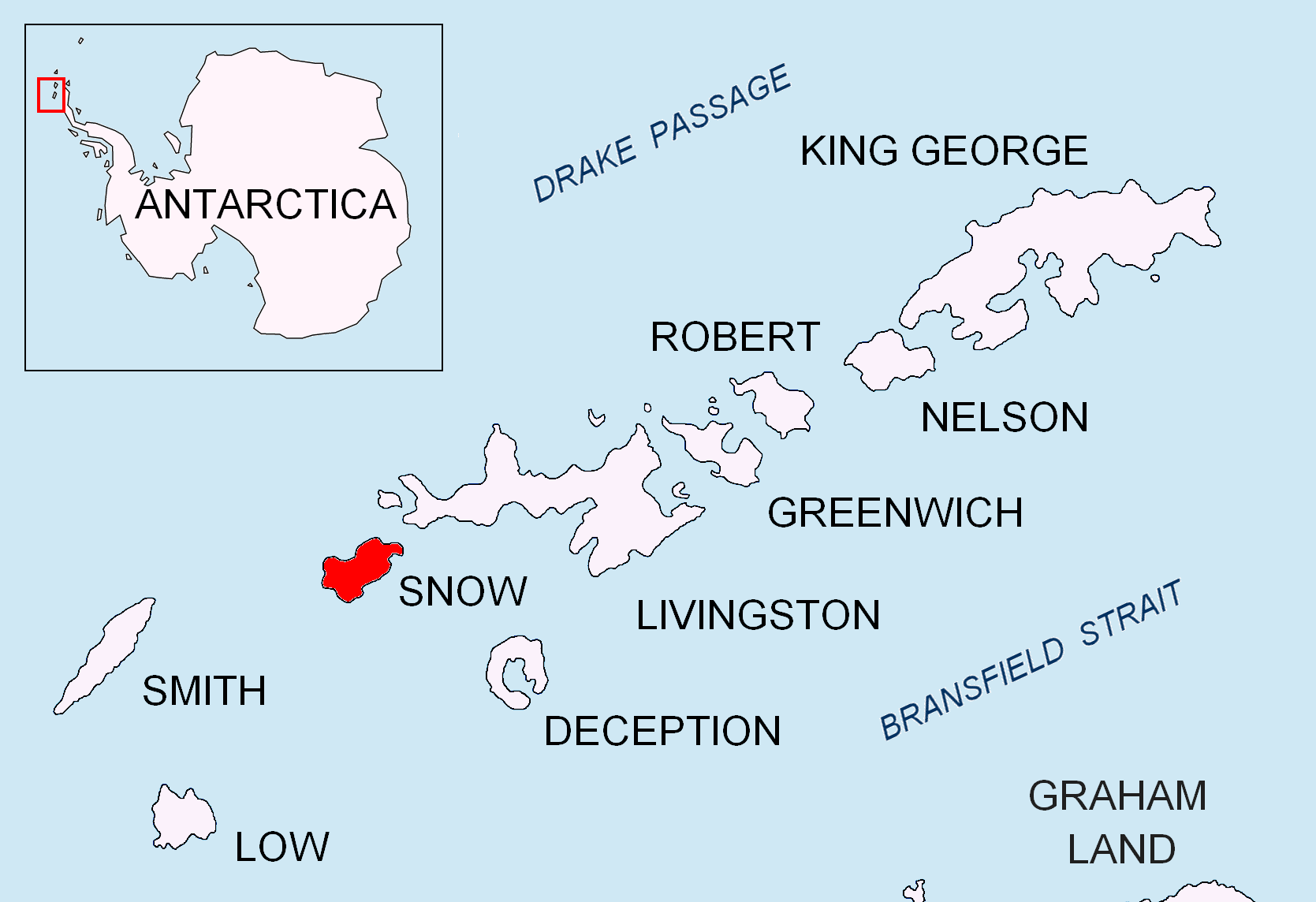
Location of Snow Island in the South Shetland Islands.

Topographic map of Livingston Island, Greenwich, Robert, Snow and Smith Islands.

Cape Timblón is the conspicuous rocky cape forming the north extremity of Snow Island in the South Shetland Islands, Antarctica. It is a northwest entrance point for Morton Strait. Linus Beach extends for 2 km on the east side of the cape. The area was visited by 19th century sealers.

The feature is named after Captain Carlos Timblón, Master of the Argentine sealing ship San Juán Nepomuceno that visited the South Shetlands in 1819–20.

== Location ==
The cape is located at 62°42′15.6″S 61°19′49.5″W which is 7 km west-northwest of President Head, 10.3 km northeast of Byewater Point, 7.16 km south by west of Benson Point, Rugged Island and 8.39 km southwest of Devils Point, Livingston Island (British mapping in 1968, Bulgarian in 2009).

== Map ==
- L.L. Ivanov. Antarctica: Livingston Island and Greenwich, Robert, Snow and Smith Islands. Scale 1:120000 topographic map. Troyan: Manfred Wörner Foundation, 2009. ISBN 978-954-92032-6-4
