= Benson Point =

Ice-free headland in the South Shetland Islands, Antarctica

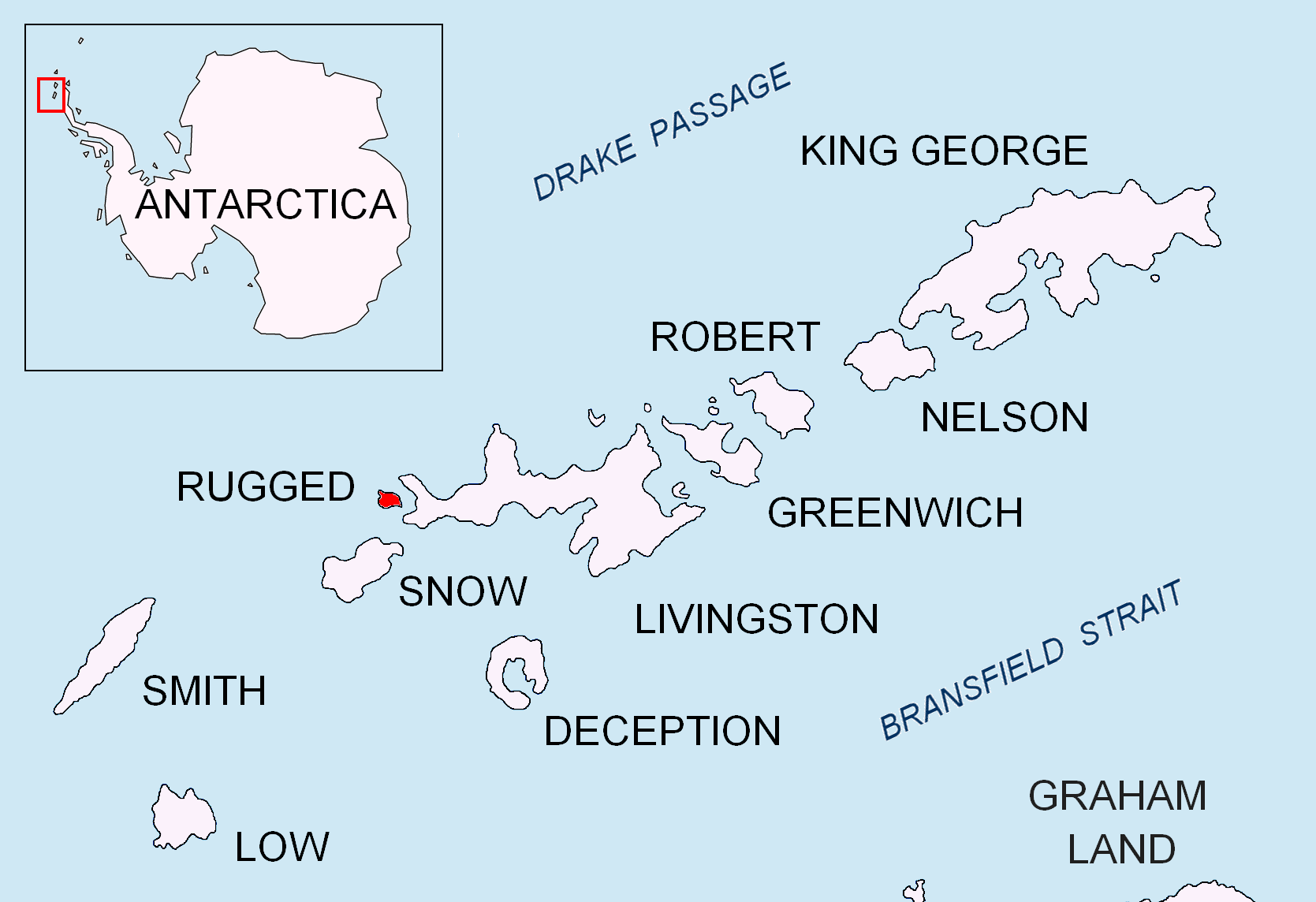
Location of Rugged Island in the South Shetland Islands.

Topographic map of Livingston Island, Greenwich, Robert, Snow and Smith Islands.

Benson Point is the ice-free headland forming the southwest extremity of Rugged Island in the South Shetland Islands, Antarctica. It is a northwest entrance point for Morton Strait. The area was known to early 19th century sealers.

The feature is named after Elof Benson, First Mate of the American brig Hersilia under Captain James Sheffield, which visited the South Shetlands in 1819–20 and 1820–21.

== Location ==
The point is located at 62°39′S 61°18′W which is 3.2 km south by east of Cape Sheffield, 4.6 km west by south of Radev Point, 6.33 km west-northwest of Devils Point, Livingston Island and 7.16 km north by east of Cape Timblón, Snow Island (British mapping in 1968, detailed Spanish mapping in 1992, Argentine mapping in 1991, and Bulgarian in 2005 and 2009).

== Maps ==
- Península Byers, Isla Livingston. Mapa topográfico a escala 1:25000. Madrid: Servicio Geográfico del Ejército, 1992.
- L.L. Ivanov et al. Antarctica: Livingston Island and Greenwich Island, South Shetland Islands. Scale 1:100000 topographic map. Sofia: Antarctic Place-names Commission of Bulgaria, 2005.
- L.L. Ivanov. Antarctica: Livingston Island and Greenwich, Robert, Snow and Smith Islands. Scale 1:120000 topographic map. Troyan: Manfred Wörner Foundation, 2009. ISBN 978-954-92032-6-4
