= Patresh Rock =

Island in the South Shetland Islands

- Location of Robert Island in the South Shetland Islands

- Location within Antarctica Location within Antarctic Peninsula

Geography
- Location: Antarctica
- Coordinates: 62°20′41″S 59°39′39″W
- Archipelago: South Shetland Islands

Administration
- Administered under the Antarctic Treaty System

Demographics
- Population: Uninhabited

Patresh Rock (Bulgarian: скала Патреш, ‘Skala Patresh’ \ska-'la 'pa-tresh\) is a rock in Clothier Harbour on the northwest coast of Robert Island in the South Shetland Islands, extending 270 m in southeast-northwest direction with a width of 40 m. The area was visited by early 19th century sealers.

The rock is named after the settlement of Patresh in Northern Bulgaria.

== Location ==
Patresh Rock is located at 62°20′41″S 59°39′39″W, which is 530 m southwest of Hammer Point and 780 m northeast of Shipot Point. British mapping in 1968 and Bulgarian mapping in 2009.

== See also ==
- List of Antarctic and sub-Antarctic islands
- South Shetland Islands

== Maps ==
- Livingston Island to King George Island. Scale 1:200000. Admiralty Nautical Chart 1776. Taunton: UK Hydrographic Office, 1968.
- L.L. Ivanov. Antarctica: Livingston Island and Greenwich, Robert, Snow and Smith Islands. Scale 1:120000 topographic map. Troyan: Manfred Wörner Foundation, 2009. ISBN 978-954-92032-6-4 (Second edition 2010, ISBN 978-954-92032-9-5)
- Antarctic Digital Database (ADD). Scale 1:250000 topographic map of Antarctica. Scientific Committee on Antarctic Research (SCAR). Since 1993, regularly upgraded and updated.
