= Pripor Nunatak =

Nunatak on Alexander Island, Antarctica

Location of Alexander Island in the Antarctic Peninsula region

Satellite image of Alexander Island

Pripor Nunatak (Bulgarian: нунатак Припор, ‘Nunatak Pripor’ \'nu-na-tak 'pri-por\) is the ridge extending 3 km in northeast-southwest direction and 600 m wide, rising to 370 m on the southwest side of Lassus Mountains in northern Alexander Island, Antarctica. It is crescent-shaped facing south-southeast, with steep and mostly ice-free northwest slopes, and surmounts Lazarev Bay to the northwest. The feature is named after the historical settlement of Pripor in Southeastern Bulgaria.

== Location ==
The ridge is located at 69°38′08″S 71°41′51″W, which is 4 km south-southeast of Faulkner Nunatak, 3.86 km southwest of Beagle Peak and 8.23 km northwest of Mount Morley.

== Maps ==
- British Antarctic Territory. Scale 1:200000 topographic map. DOS 610 – W 69 70. Tolworth, UK, 1971
- Antarctic Digital Database (ADD). Scale 1:250000 topographic map of Antarctica. Scientific Committee on Antarctic Research (SCAR). Since 1993, regularly upgraded and updated
