= Morton Strait =

Strait in the South Shetland Islands, Antarctica

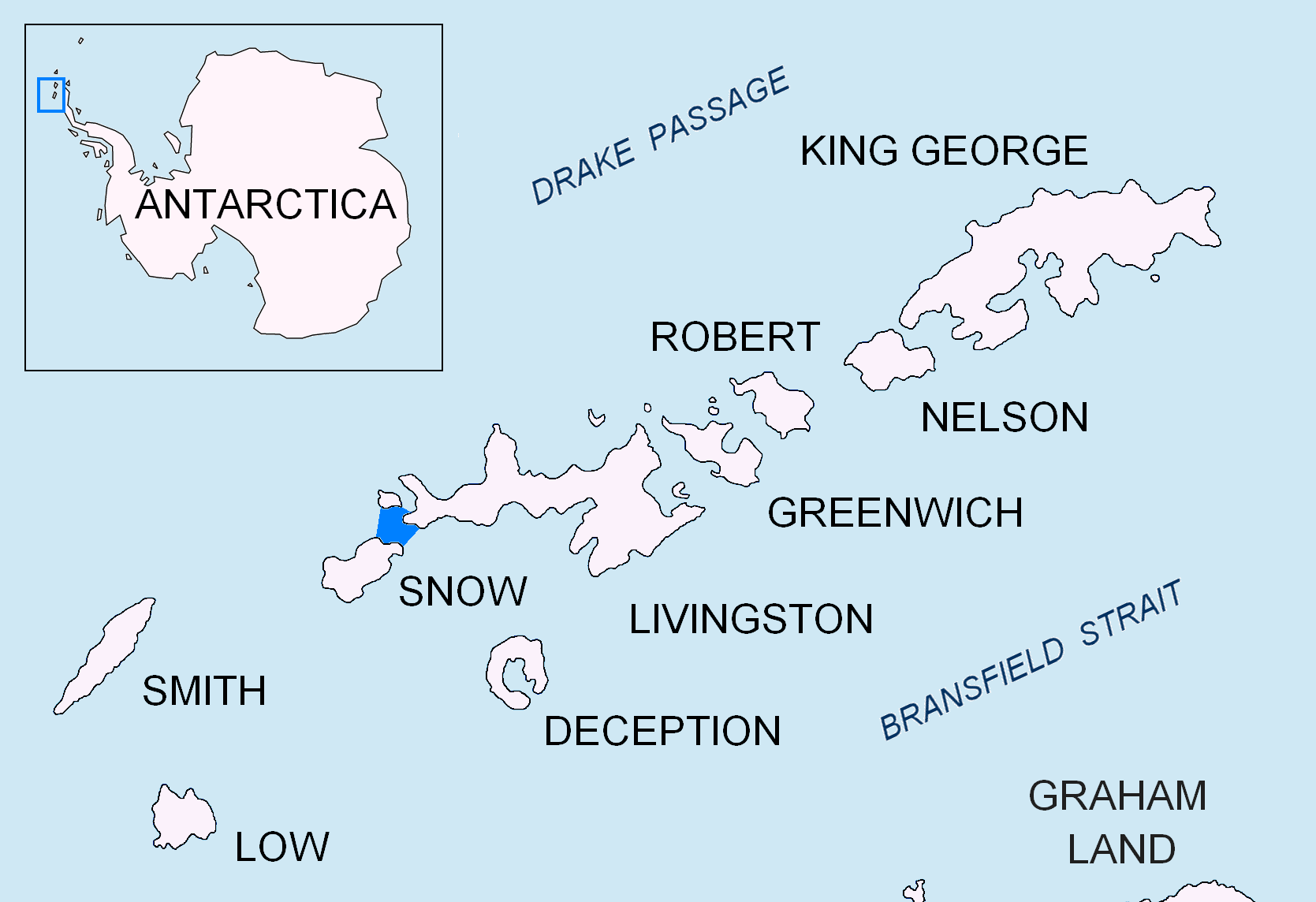
Location of Morton Strait in the South Shetland Islands

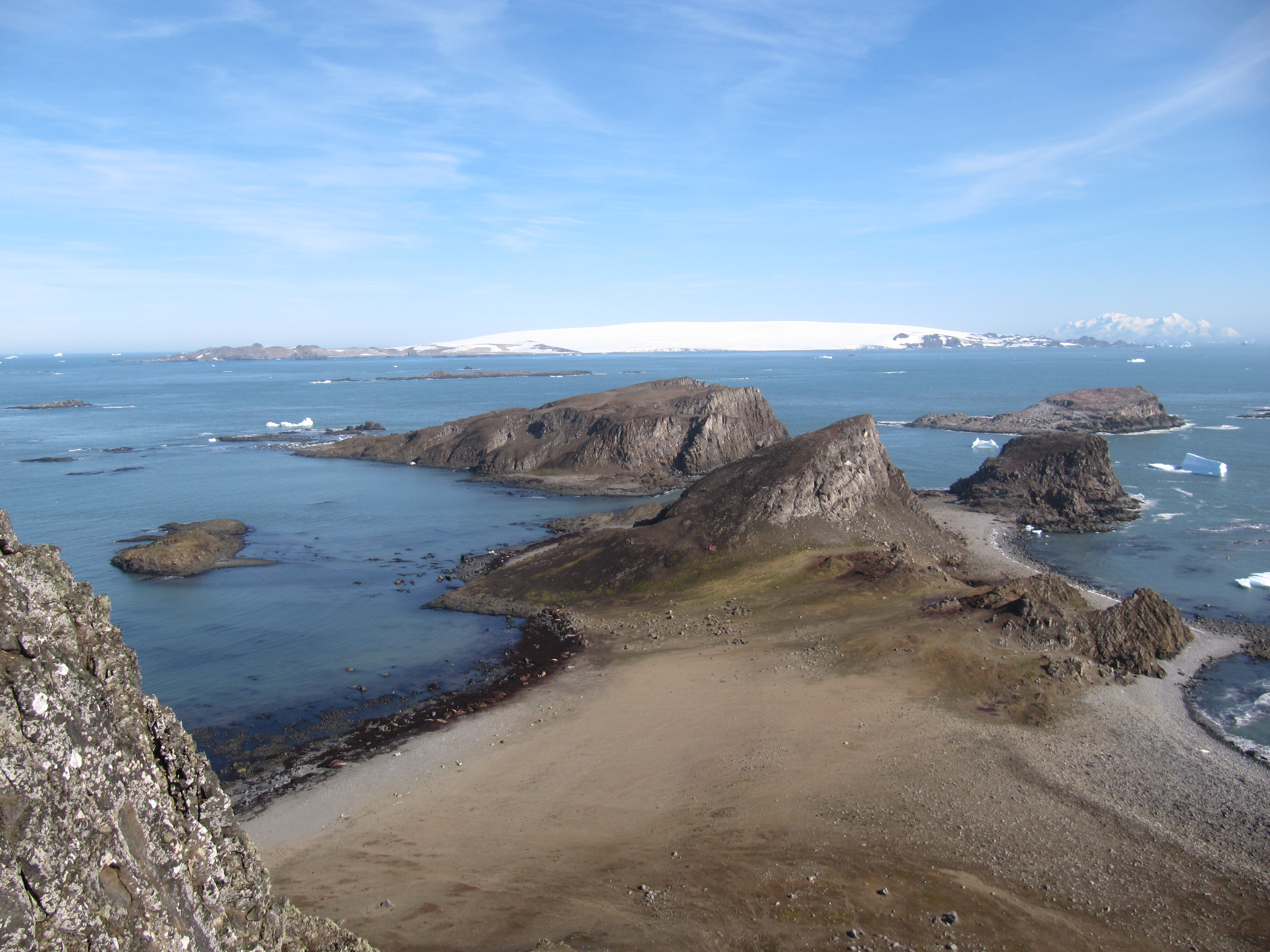
Devils Point from Lucifer Crags, with Hell Gates and Vardim Rocks in the middle ground, Morton Strait and Snow Island in the background, and Smith Island seen on the horizon on the right

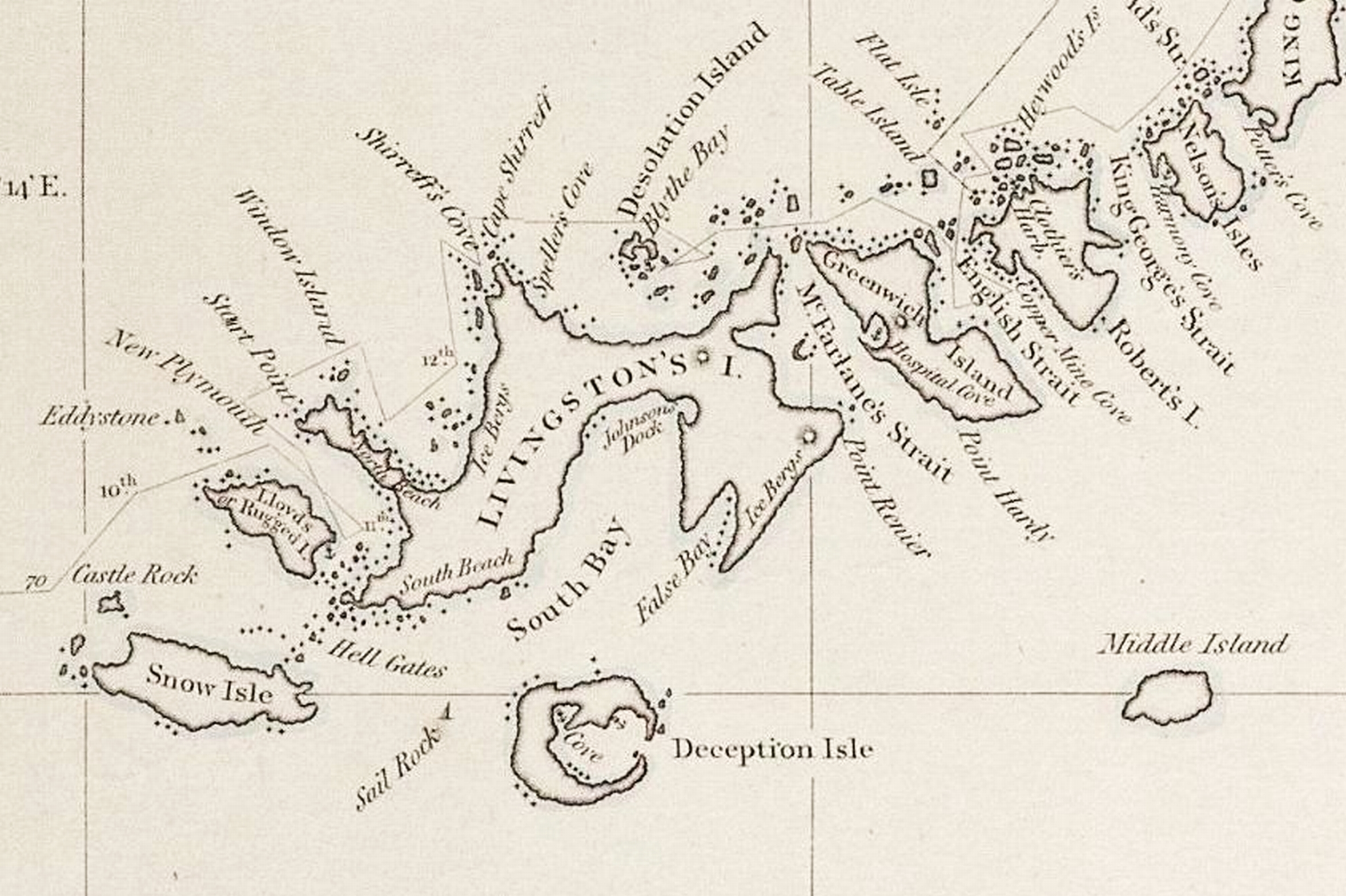
Fragment of George Powell's 1822 chart of the South Shetland Islands and South Orkney Islands featuring Morton Strait (as 'Hell Gates')

Topographic map of Livingston Island

Morton Strait is the 9-kilometre-long (4.9 nmi) and 6.2-kilometre-wide (3.3 nmi) strait between Snow Island on the southwest and Rugged Island and Livingston Island on the northeast, in the South Shetland Islands, Antarctica. The Aim Rocks and Long Rock lie in the strait.

The feature was named on a chart by James Weddell, published in 1825, and is now established in international usage.

== Location ==
The strait is centred at (62°41′50″S 61°13′12″W) (British mapping in 1821 and 1968, Chilean mapping in 1971, Argentine mapping in 1980, and Bulgarian mapping in 2005 and 2009). The United States Geological Survey gives the location as 62°42′S 61°14′W.

== Related features ==
=== Aim Rocks ===
Aim Rocks (62°41′43.6″S 61°15′50.6″W) is a group of rocks lying east of Cape Timblón in the middle of Morton Strait. The name, given by the United Kingdom Antarctic Place-Names Committee in 1961, is descriptive; these rocks in line are a guide for safe passage through the southern entrance of Morton Strait. Interactive image.

=== Long Rock ===
Long Rock (62°42′S 61°11′W) is a large rock extending 720 m (787 yd) in east–west direction, 180 m (197 yd) wide and rising to 13 m (42.7 ft) in the northeast of Morton Strait. The area was visited by early 19th century sealers operating on Byers Peninsula. The rock is located 1.6 km (0.99 mi) south-southwest of Vardim Rocks, 2.1 km (1.30 mi) south-southwest of Devils Point, 4.2 km (2.61 mi) north of President Head, Snow Island, 7 km (4.35 mi) east-northeast of Cape Timblón, Snow Island and 6.93 km (4.31 mi) southeast of Benson Point, Rugged Island (British mapping in 1933 and 1968, Argentine in 1946 and 1953, Chilean in 1947 and 1971, French in 1951, detailed Spanish mapping in 1992, and Bulgarian mapping in 2005 and 2009). The feature was named by Discovery Investigations personnel that charted Morton Strait in 1930–31. Interactive image.

== Maps ==
- Chart of South Shetland including Coronation Island, &c. from the exploration of the sloop Dove in the years 1821 and 1822 by George Powell Commander of the same. Scale ca. 1:200000. London: Laurie, 1822.
- South Shetland Islands. Scale 1:200000 topographic map No. 5657. DOS 610 – W 62 60. Tolworth, UK, 1968.
- Islas Livingston y Decepción. Mapa topográfico a escala 1:100000. Madrid: Servicio Geográfico del Ejército, 1991.
- L.L. Ivanov et al., Antarctica: Livingston Island and Greenwich Island, South Shetland Islands (from English Strait to Morton Strait, with illustrations and ice-cover distribution), 1:100000 scale topographic map, Antarctic Place-names Commission of Bulgaria, Sofia, 2005
- L.L. Ivanov. Antarctica: Livingston Island and Greenwich, Robert, Snow and Smith Islands. Scale 1:120000 topographic map. Troyan: Manfred Wörner Foundation, 2010. ISBN 978-954-92032-9-5 (First edition 2009. ISBN 978-954-92032-6-4)
- Antarctic Digital Database (ADD). Scale 1:250000 topographic map of Antarctica. Scientific Committee on Antarctic Research (SCAR), 1993–2016.
