= Penov Knoll =

Mountain in Antarctica

Coordinates: 62°52′35.5″S 62°18′41.3″W

Location of Smith Island in the South Shetland Islands.

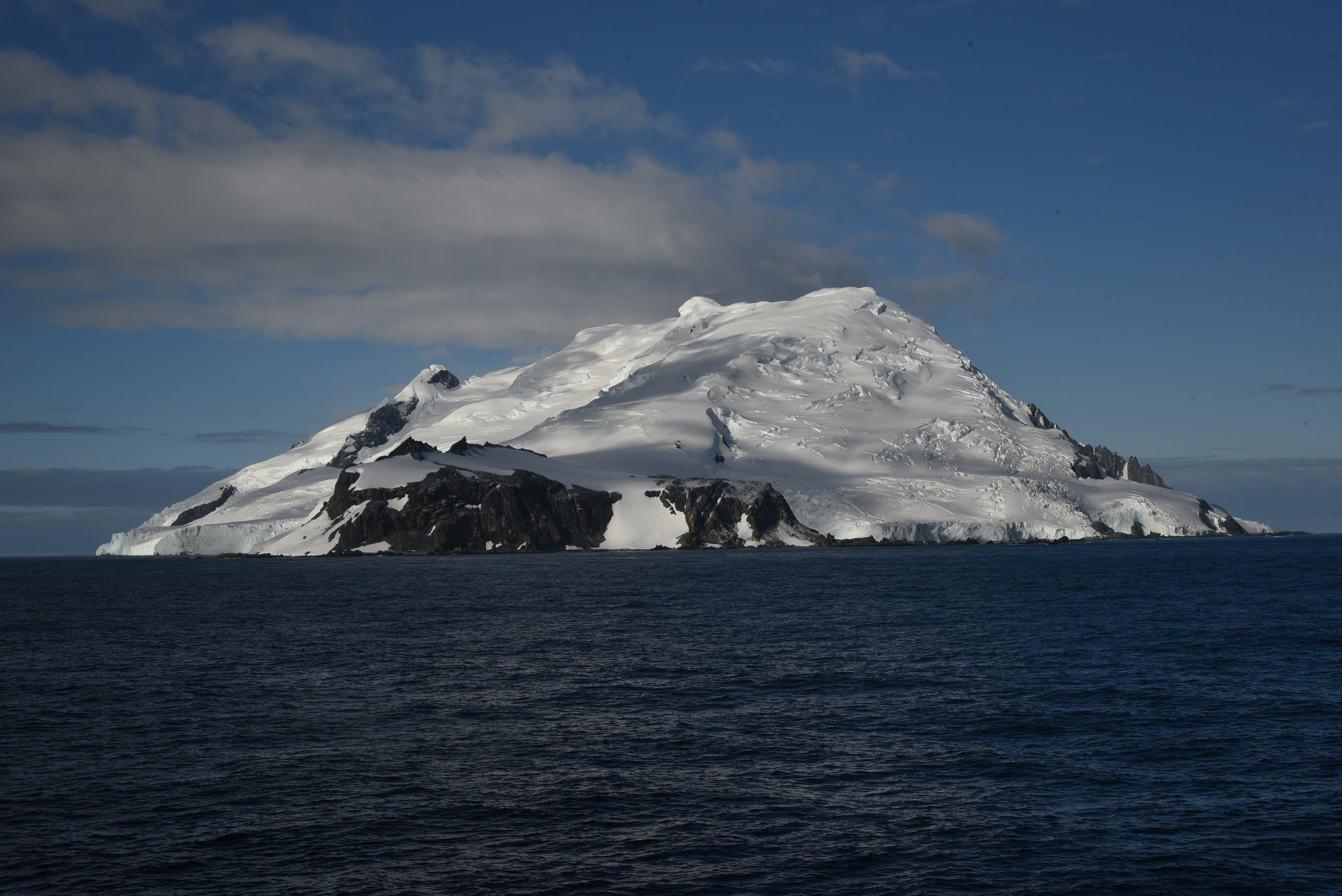
Cape Smith of Smith Island in Antarctica seen from Boyd Strait, with Penov Knoll in the foreground and Matochina Peak in the background

Topographic map of Smith Island

Large scale map of Cape Smith area on Smith Island in the South Shetland Islands

Penov Knoll (Bulgarian: Пенова могила, romanized: Penova mogila, IPA: [ˈpɛnovɐ moˈgiɫɐ]) is the partially ice-free hill of elevation 155 m at the northern foot of Imeon Range on Smith Island, South Shetland Islands in Antarctica, forming the island's northeast extremity Cape Smith. It is located 2.9 km northeast of Matochina Peak, and connected on the southwest to the mainland of the island by a 400 m wide isthmus of elevation 76 m. The area was visited by seal hunters in the early 19th century.

The feature is named after Sasho Penov, Deputy Minister of Education and Science (2022–2023), for his assistance in the acquisition and operation of the Bulgarian polar research vessel Sts. Cyril and Methodius by the Nikola Vaptsarov Naval Academy in Varna and the Bulgarian Antarctic Institute.

== Maps ==
- Chart of South Shetland including Coronation Island, &c. from the exploration of the sloop Dove in the years 1821 and 1822 by George Powell Commander of the same. Scale ca. 1:200000. London: Laurie, 1822.
- L.L. Ivanov. Antarctica: Livingston Island and Greenwich, Robert, Snow and Smith Islands. Scale 1:120000 topographic map. Troyan: Manfred Wörner Foundation, 2010. ISBN 978-954-92032-9-5 (First edition 2009. ISBN 978-954-92032-6-4)
- South Shetland Islands: Smith and Low Islands. Scale 1:150000 topographic map No. 13677. British Antarctic Survey, 2009.
- Antarctic Digital Database (ADD). Scale 1:250000 topographic map of Antarctica. Scientific Committee on Antarctic Research (SCAR). Since 1993, regularly upgraded and updated.
- L.L. Ivanov. Antarctica: Livingston Island and Smith Island. Scale 1:100000 topographic map. Manfred Wörner Foundation, 2017. ISBN 978-619-90008-3-0
- A. Kamburov, L. Ivanov, N. Aleksandrova, V. Nikolova. Cape Smith, Smith Island, Antarctica. Scale 1:10000 topographic map. Manfred Wörner Foundation, 2026. ISBN 978-619-92883-2-0
