= Astor Island =

Island in Antarctica

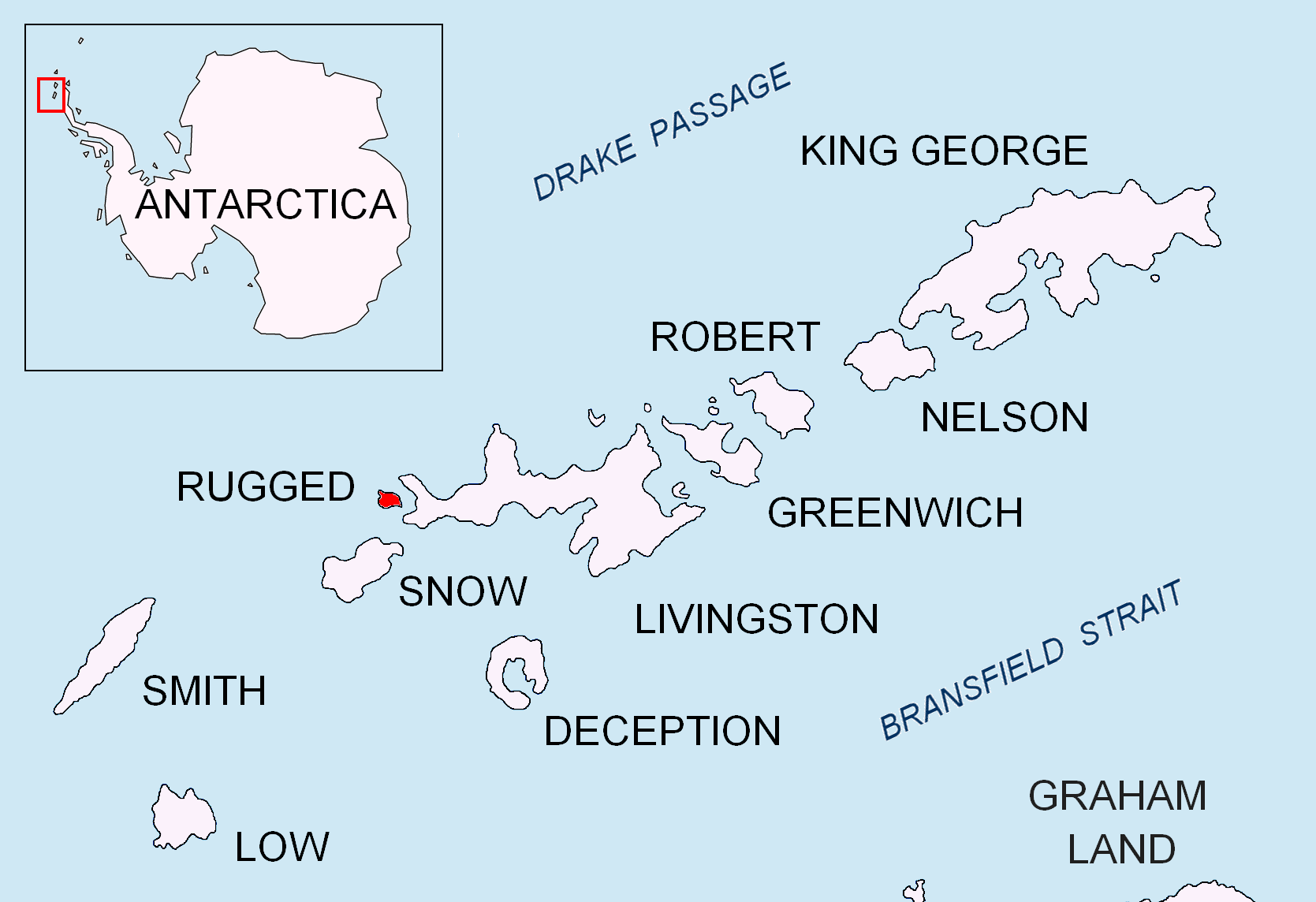
- Location of Rugged Island in the South Shetland Islands.

- Location within Antarctic Peninsula Location within Antarctica

Geography
- Location: Antarctica
- Coordinates: 62°38′22.8″S 61°10′15.4″W
- Archipelago: South Shetland Islands
- Area: 12 ha (30 acres)

Administration
- Administered under the Antarctic Treaty System

Demographics
- Population: Uninhabited

Astor Island is an island lying between Rugged Island and Livingston Island in the South Shetland Islands, Antarctica. Surface area 12 hectares (30 acres).

The feature was named by the United Kingdom Antarctic Place-Names Committee in 1958 for B. Astor of the New York Lyceum of Natural History (now the American Museum of Natural History).

== Maps ==
- Península Byers, Isla Livingston. Mapa topográfico a escala 1:25000. Madrid: Servicio Geográfico del Ejército, 1992.
- L.L. Ivanov et al. Antarctica: Livingston Island and Greenwich Island, South Shetland Islands. Scale 1:100000 topographic map. Sofia: Antarctic Place-names Commission of Bulgaria, 2005.
- L.L. Ivanov. Antarctica: Livingston Island and Greenwich, Robert, Snow and Smith Islands. Scale 1:120000 topographic map. Troyan: Manfred Wörner Foundation, 2009. ISBN 978-954-92032-6-4
- L.L. Ivanov. Antarctica: Livingston Island and Smith Island. Scale 1:100000 topographic map. Manfred Wörner Foundation, 2017. ISBN 978-619-90008-3-0

== See also ==
- Composite Antarctic Gazetteer
- List of Antarctic islands south of 60° S
- SCAR
- Territorial claims in Antarctica
