= Osogovo Bay =

Bay in Antarctica

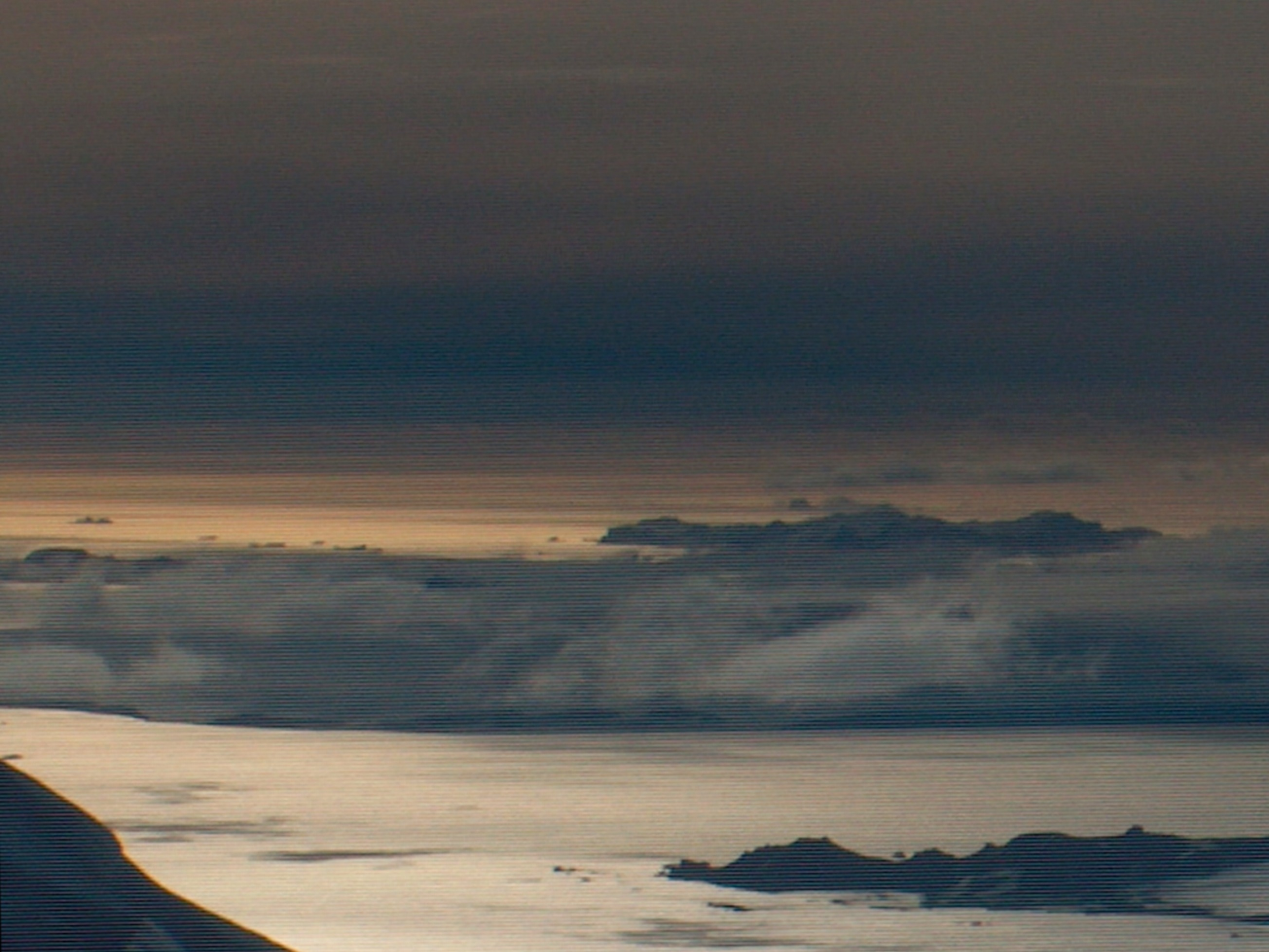
Osogovo Bay (in the background) from Mount Friesland.

Topographic map of Livingston Island.

Osogovo Bay (Bulgarian: Осоговски залив, romanized: Osogovski zaliv, IPA: [osoˈɡɔfski ˈzalif]), "named after the Osogovo region in western Bulgaria," is bounded by the south coast of Rugged Island, by Astor Island, and by the west coast of the Byers Peninsula south of Laager Point, Livingston Island in the South Shetland Islands, Antarctica.

By sea, it is entered between Benson Point and Devils Point.

== Location ==
The bay is centred at 62°39′05″S 61°11′42″W.

== Maps ==
- South Shetland Islands. Scale 1:200000 topographic map No. 5657. DOS 610 – W 62 60. Tolworth, UK, 1968.
- Islas Livingston y Decepción. Mapa topográfico a escala 1:100000. Madrid: Servicio Geográfico del Ejército, 1991.
- Península Byers, Isla Livingston. Mapa topográfico a escala 1:25000. Madrid: Servicio Geográfico del Ejército, 1992. (Map image on p. 55 of the linked study)
- L.L. Ivanov et al. Antarctica: Livingston Island and Greenwich Island, South Shetland Islands. Scale 1:100000 topographic map. Sofia: Antarctic Place-names Commission of Bulgaria, 2005.
- L.L. Ivanov. Antarctica: Livingston Island and Greenwich, Robert, Snow and Smith Islands. Scale 1:120000 topographic map. Troyan: Manfred Wörner Foundation, 2009. ISBN 978-954-92032-6-4
- Antarctic Digital Database (ADD). Scale 1:250000 topographic map of Antarctica. Scientific Committee on Antarctic Research (SCAR), 1993–2016.
