= President Beaches =

Series of beaches in Antarctica

Location of Byers Peninsula, Livingston Island in the South Shetland Islands

Topographic map of Antarctic Specially Protected Area ASPA 126 Byers Peninsula

Topographic map of Livingston Island and Smith Island

President Beaches is a series of beaches which extend for 6 nautical miles (11 km) along the broad western end of Byers Peninsula, Livingston Island in the South Shetland Islands, Antarctica between Start Point to the north and Devils Point to the south.

The name "West Beaches" was proposed by K.R. Everett, United States Antarctic Research Program (USARP) researcher who made a reconnaissance soil survey in the area during February 1969. The proposed name is locationally appropriate but would be repetitious. The Advisory Committee on Antarctic Names (US-ACAN) has chosen instead to restore a historical name to the vicinity. In the early part of the 1820–21 season, the Stonington sealers used the name "President's Harbor" (now New Plymouth) for the anchorage immediately off these beaches.

== Location ==
The beaches are centred at 62°37′30″S 61°07′00″W (British mapping in 1968, detailed Spanish mapping in 1992, and Bulgarian mapping in 2005 and 2009).

== Maps ==
- Península Byers, Isla Livingston. Mapa topográfico a escala 1:25000. Madrid: Servicio Geográfico del Ejército, 1992. (Map image on p. 55 of the linked study)
- L.L. Ivanov et al. Antarctica: Livingston Island and Greenwich Island, South Shetland Islands. Scale 1:100000 topographic map. Sofia: Antarctic Place-names Commission of Bulgaria, 2005.
- L.L. Ivanov. Antarctica: Livingston Island and Greenwich, Robert, Snow and Smith Islands. Scale 1:120000 topographic map. Troyan: Manfred Wörner Foundation, 2009. ISBN 978-954-92032-6-4
- Antarctic Digital Database (ADD). Scale 1:250000 topographic map of Antarctica. Scientific Committee on Antarctic Research (SCAR). Since 1993, regularly upgraded and updated.
- L.L. Ivanov. Antarctica: Livingston Island and Smith Island. Scale 1:100000 topographic map. Manfred Wörner Foundation, 2017. ISBN 978-619-90008-3-0
