= New Plymouth (Livingston Island) =

Bay bordered by an extensive line of beaches in the South Shetland Islands, Antarctica

Location of Byers Peninsula, Livingston Island in the South Shetland Islands

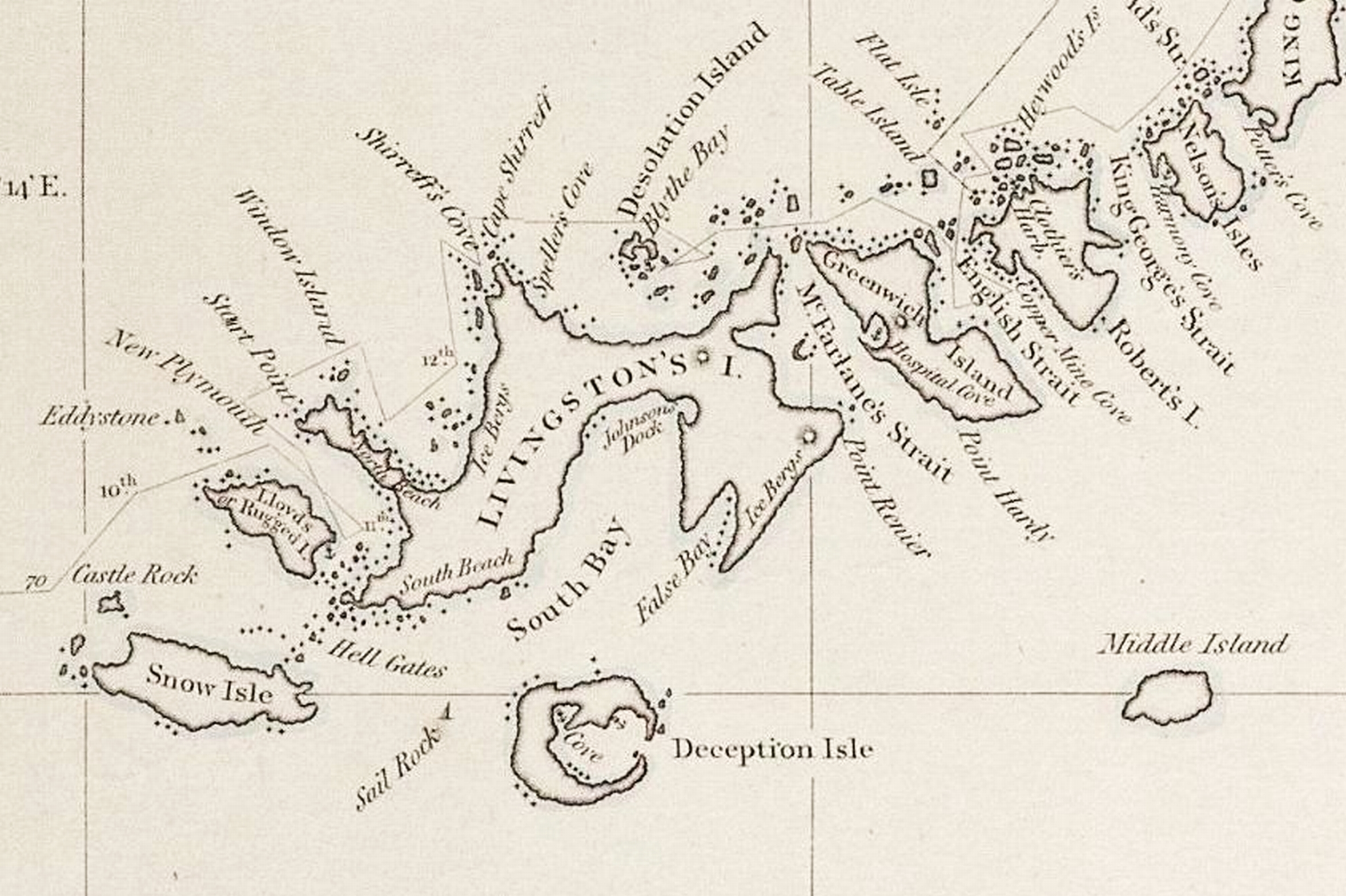
Fragment of George Powell's 1822 chart of the South Shetland Islands and South Orkney Islands featuring New Plymouth

Topographic map of Livingston Island

New Plymouth is a bay bordered by an extensive line of beaches, lying south of Start Point and between Rugged Island and the west end of Livingston Island in the South Shetland Islands, Antarctica.

This descriptive name, used by early sealers, dates back to at least 1822 and is now established in international usage.

== Location ==
The bay is centred at 62°37′05.2″S 61°11′05″W (British mapping in 1968, detailed Spanish mapping in 1993, and Bulgarian mapping in 2005 and 2009).

== Maps ==
- Chart of South Shetland including Coronation Island, &c. from the exploration of the sloop Dove in the years 1821 and 1822 by George Powell Commander of the same. Scale ca. 1:200000. London: Laurie, 1822.
- South Shetland Islands. Scale 1:200000 topographic map No. 5657. DOS 610 – W 62 60. Tolworth, UK, 1968.
- Islas Livingston y Decepción. Mapa topográfico a escala 1:100000. Madrid: Servicio Geográfico del Ejército, 1991.
- Península Byers, Isla Livingston. Mapa topográfico a escala 1:25000. Madrid: Servicio Geográfico del Ejército, 1992. (Map image on p. 55 of the linked study)
- L.L. Ivanov et al. Antarctica: Livingston Island and Greenwich Island, South Shetland Islands. Scale 1:100000 topographic map. Sofia: Antarctic Place-names Commission of Bulgaria, 2005.
- L.L. Ivanov. Antarctica: Livingston Island and Greenwich, Robert, Snow and Smith Islands. Scale 1:120000 topographic map. Troyan: Manfred Wörner Foundation, 2009. ISBN 978-954-92032-6-4
- Antarctic Digital Database (ADD). Scale 1:250000 topographic map of Antarctica. Scientific Committee on Antarctic Research (SCAR). Since 1993, regularly updated.
- L.L. Ivanov. Antarctica: Livingston Island and Smith Island. Scale 1:100000 topographic map. Manfred Wörner Foundation, 2017. ISBN 978-619-90008-3-0
