= Devils Point =

Point marking the southwest extremity of Byers Peninsula in Antarctica

Location of Byers Peninsula, Livingston Island in the South Shetland Islands

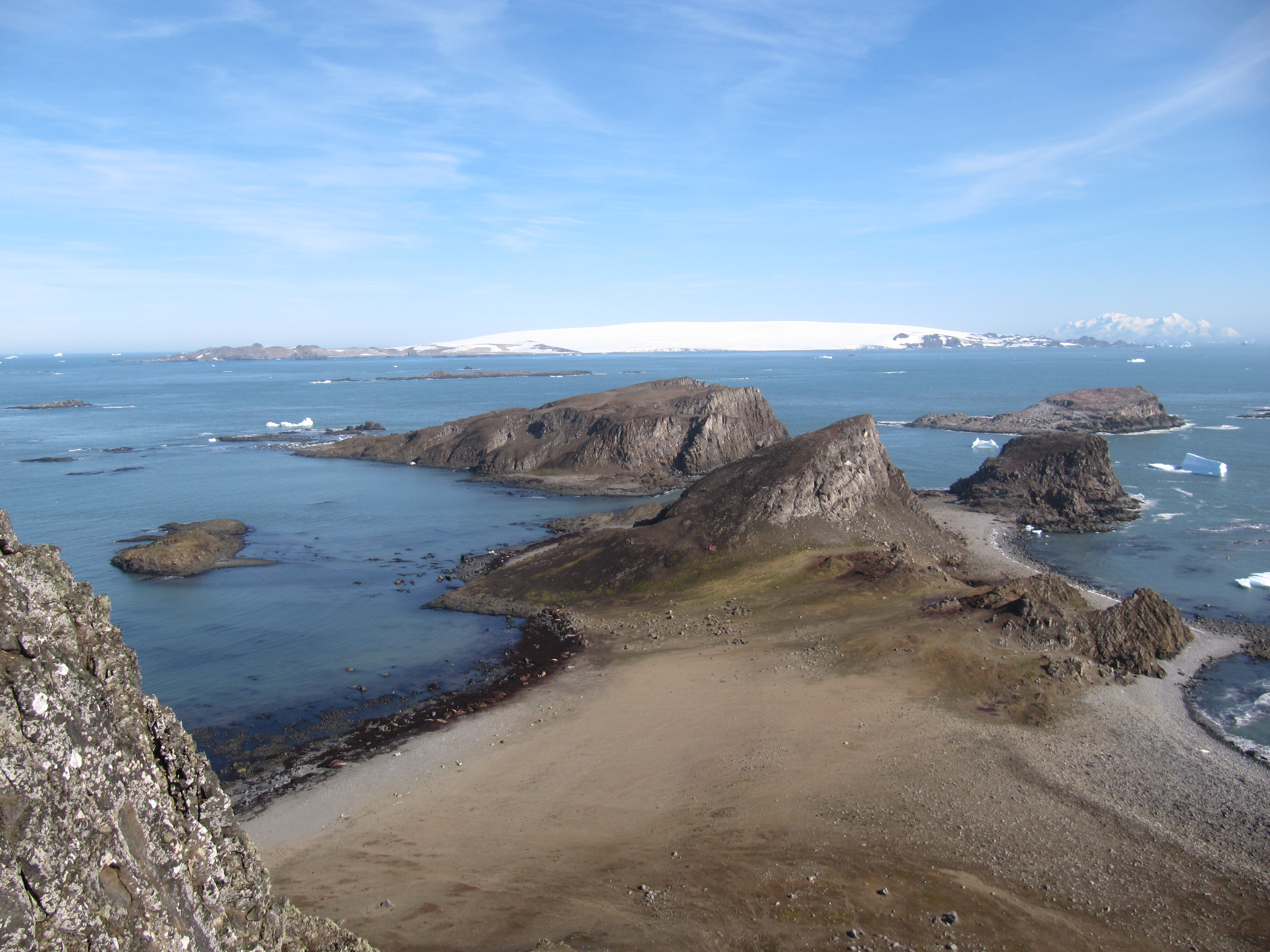
Devils Point from Lucifer Crags, with Hell Gates and Vardim Rocks in the middle ground, Long Rock in Morton Strait and Snow Island in the background, and Smith Island seen on the horizon on the right

Devils Point is a point marking the southwest extremity of Byers Peninsula, Livingston Island in the South Shetland Islands, Antarctica and forming the southeast side of the entrance to Osogovo Bay and the west side of the entrance to Raskuporis Cove. The point is separated from Vardim Rocks to the south by Hell Gates. Lucifer Crags, a rocky bluff rising to 81 m at the south extremity of President Beaches, surmount Devils Point on the southwest, Acheron Lake on the northeast and Siren Lake on the east-southeast. The area was visited by early 19th century sealers.

The point was charted and named by James Weddell, Royal Navy, Master of the brig Jane, during the period 1820–23.

== Location ==
The point is located at 62°40′15.9″S 61°10′57.3″W which is 6.22 km north of President Head, Snow Island, 6.33 km east-southeast of Benson Point, Rugged Island and 16.8 km west by north of Elephant Point. British mapping in 1968, detailed Spanish mapping in 1992, and Bulgarian mapping in 2005 and 2009.

== Maps ==
- Chart of South Shetland including Coronation Island, &c. from the exploration of the sloop Dove in the years 1821 and 1822 by George Powell Commander of the same. Scale ca. 1:200000. London: Laurie, 1822
- Península Byers, Isla Livingston. Mapa topográfico a escala 1:25000. Madrid: Servicio Geográfico del Ejército, 1992. (Map image on p. 55 of the linked study)
- L.L. Ivanov et al. Antarctica: Livingston Island and Greenwich Island, South Shetland Islands. Scale 1:100000 topographic map. Sofia: Antarctic Place-names Commission of Bulgaria, 2005.
- L.L. Ivanov. Antarctica: Livingston Island and Greenwich, Robert, Snow and Smith Islands. Scale 1:120000 topographic map. Troyan: Manfred Wörner Foundation, 2009. ISBN 978-954-92032-6-4

== In fiction ==
- The Devils Point area is part of the mise-en-scène of the 2016 Antarctica thriller novel The Killing Ship by Simon Beaufort; the point is shown on a sketch map of Livingston Island illustrating the book.

== Gallery ==
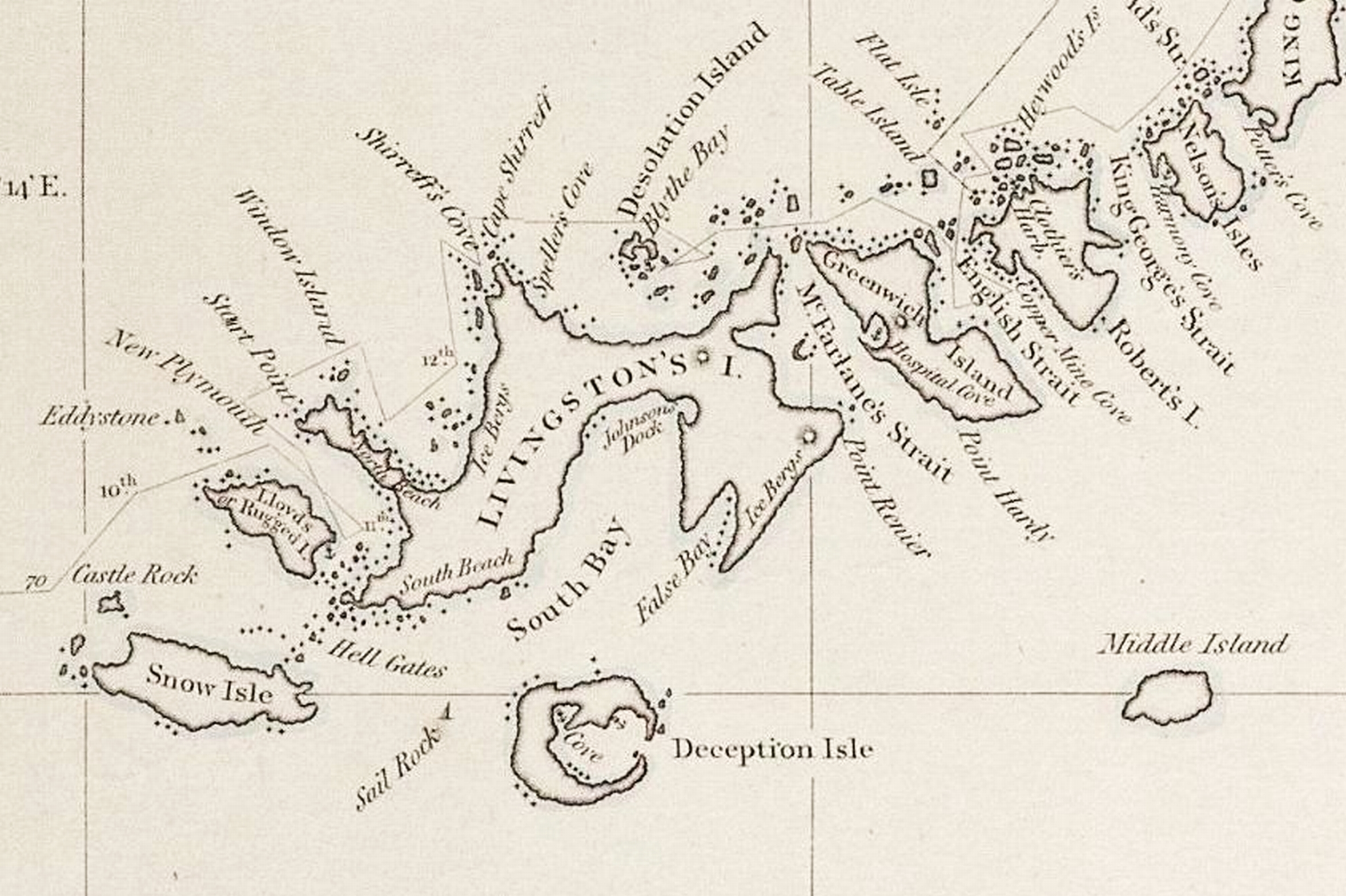
Fragment of George Powell's 1822 chart of the South Shetland Islands and South Orkney Islands depicting Devils Point

Map of Antarctic Specially Protected Area ASPA 126 Byers Peninsula

Topographic map of Livingston Island

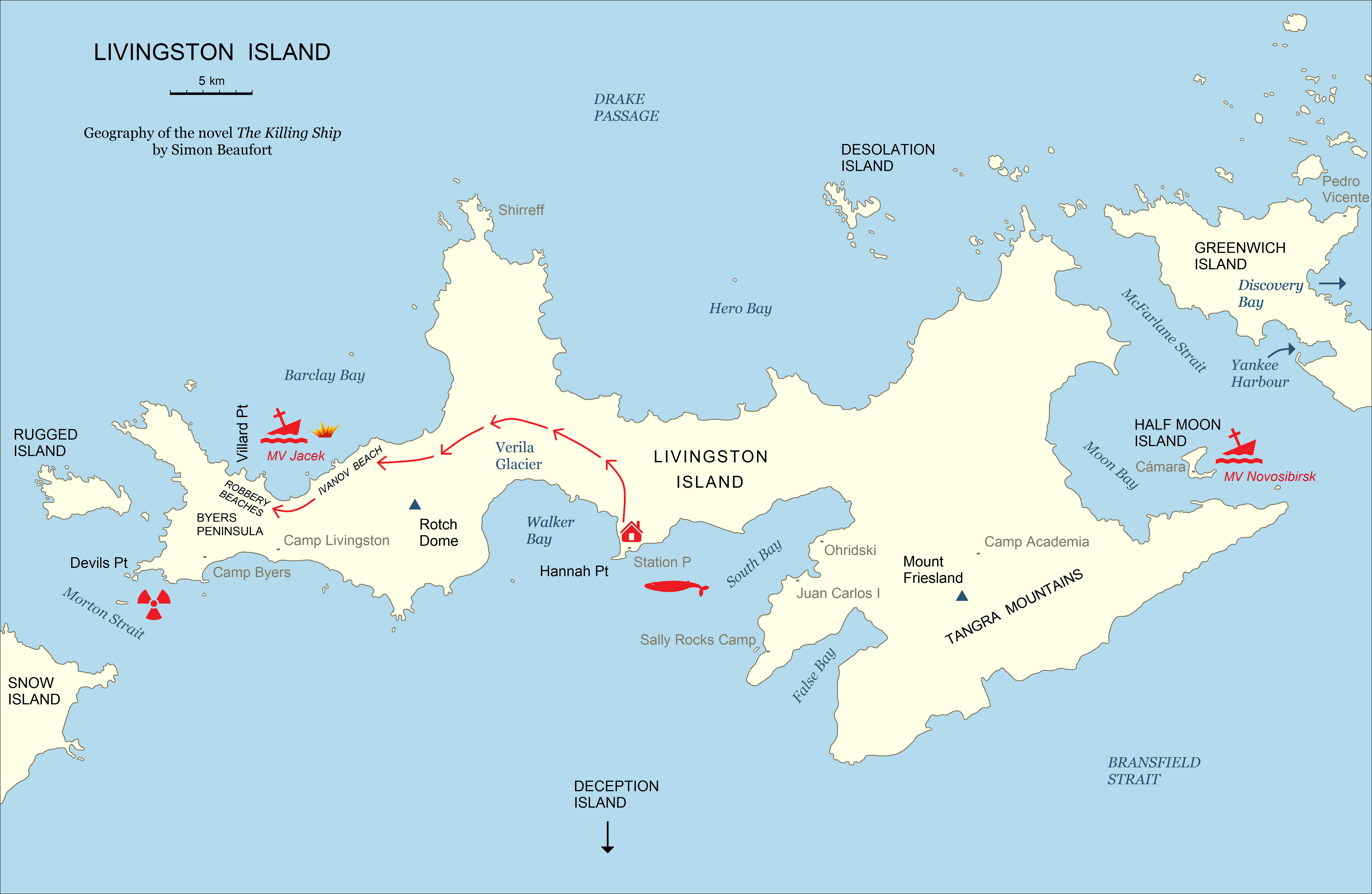
Geography of the novel
The Killing Ship by Simon Beaufort
