= Snow Island (South Shetland Islands) =

Island in Antarctica

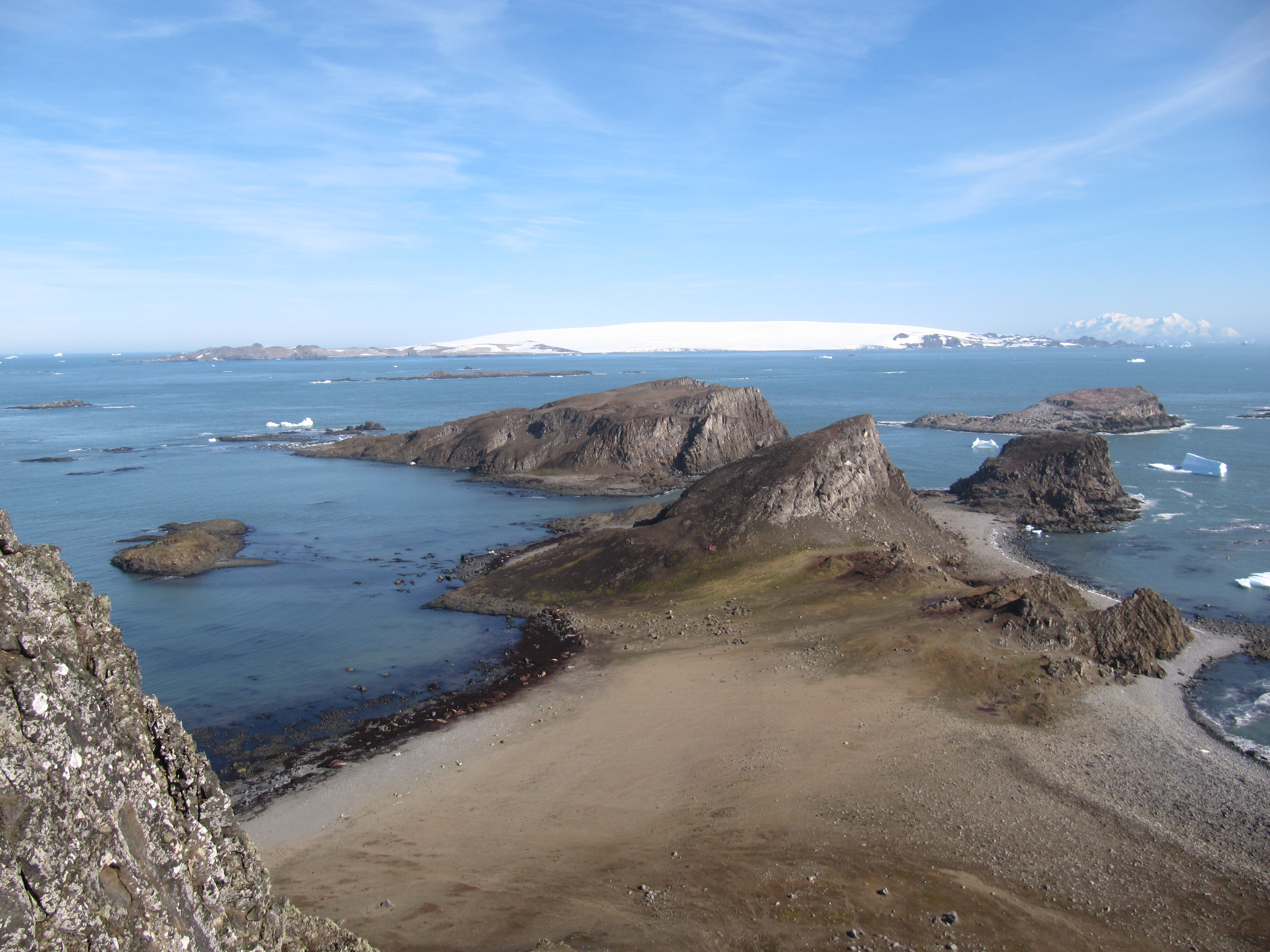
- Devils Point from Lucifer Crags, with Hell Gates and Vardim Rocks in the middle ground, Morton Strait and Snow Island in the background, and Smith Island seen on the horizon on the right

- Topographic map of Livingston Island, Greenwich, Robert, Snow and Smith Islands

- Location in the South Shetland Islands Location in Antarctica

Geography
- Location: Antarctica
- Coordinates: 62°47′S 61°23′W
- Archipelago: South Shetland Islands
- Area: 120.4 km^{2} (46.5 sq mi)
- Length: 16 km (9.9 mi)
- Width: 8 km (5 mi)

Administration
- Administered under the Antarctic Treaty System

Demographics
- Population: Uninhabited

Snow Island or Isla Nevada is a completely ice-covered island, 16 by 8 kilometres (9.9 by 5.0 mi) in size, lying 6 kilometres (3.7 mi) southwest of Livingston Island in the South Shetland Islands. Surface area is 120.4 square kilometres (46.5 sq mi). This island was known to both American and British sealers as early as 1820, and the name has been well established in international usage for over 100 years.

== Maps ==
- Chart of South Shetland including Coronation Island, &c. from the exploration of the sloop Dove in the years 1821 and 1822 by George Powell Commander of the same. Scale ca. 1:200000. London: Laurie, 1822

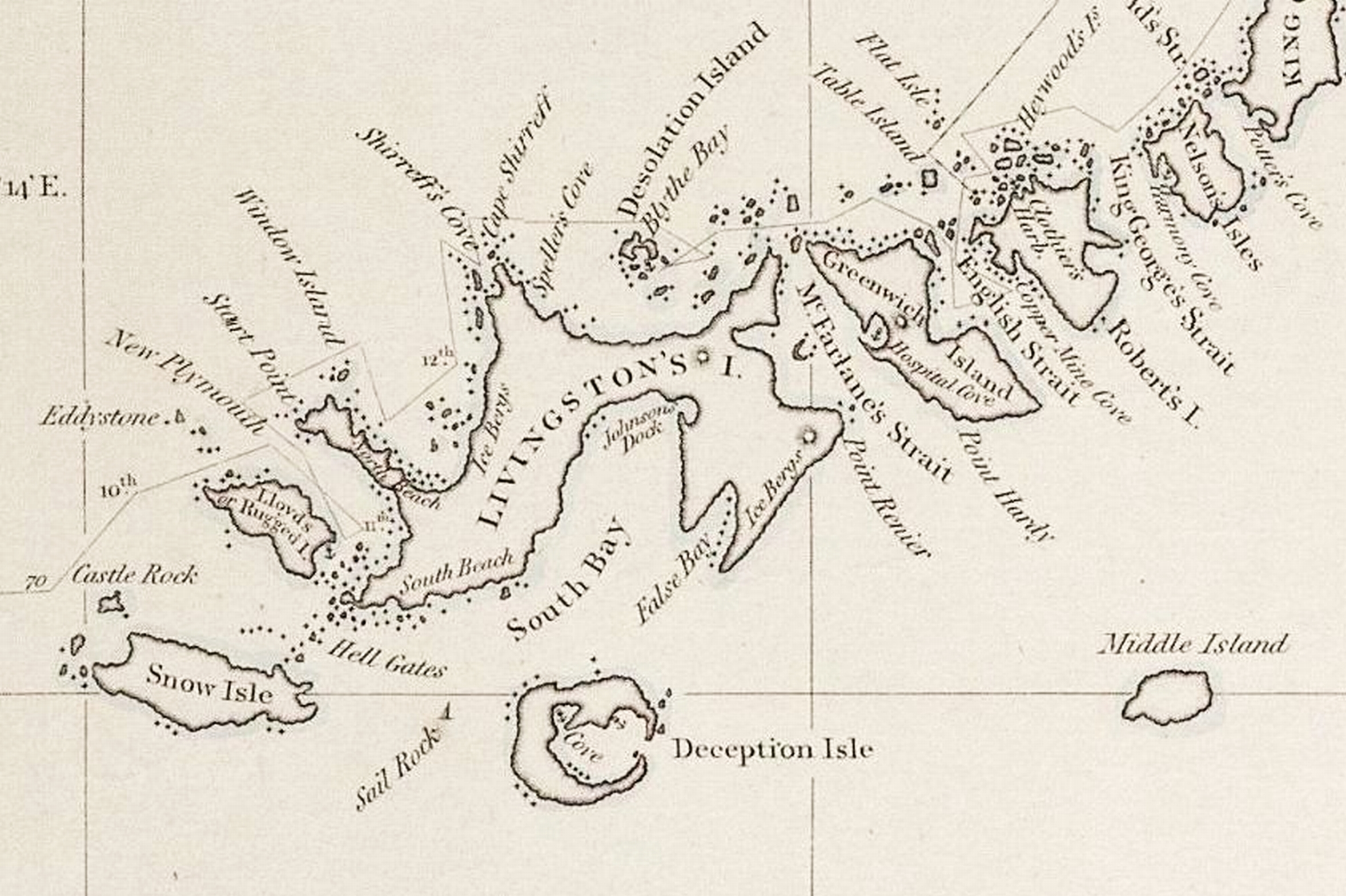
Fragment of George Powell's 1822 chart of the South Shetland Islands and South Orkney Islands featuring Snow Island

== See also ==
- Composite Antarctic Gazetteer
- List of Antarctic islands south of 60° S
- SCAR
- Territorial claims in Antarctica
