= Domino Lake =

Antarctic lake

- езеро Доминото (Bulgarian)
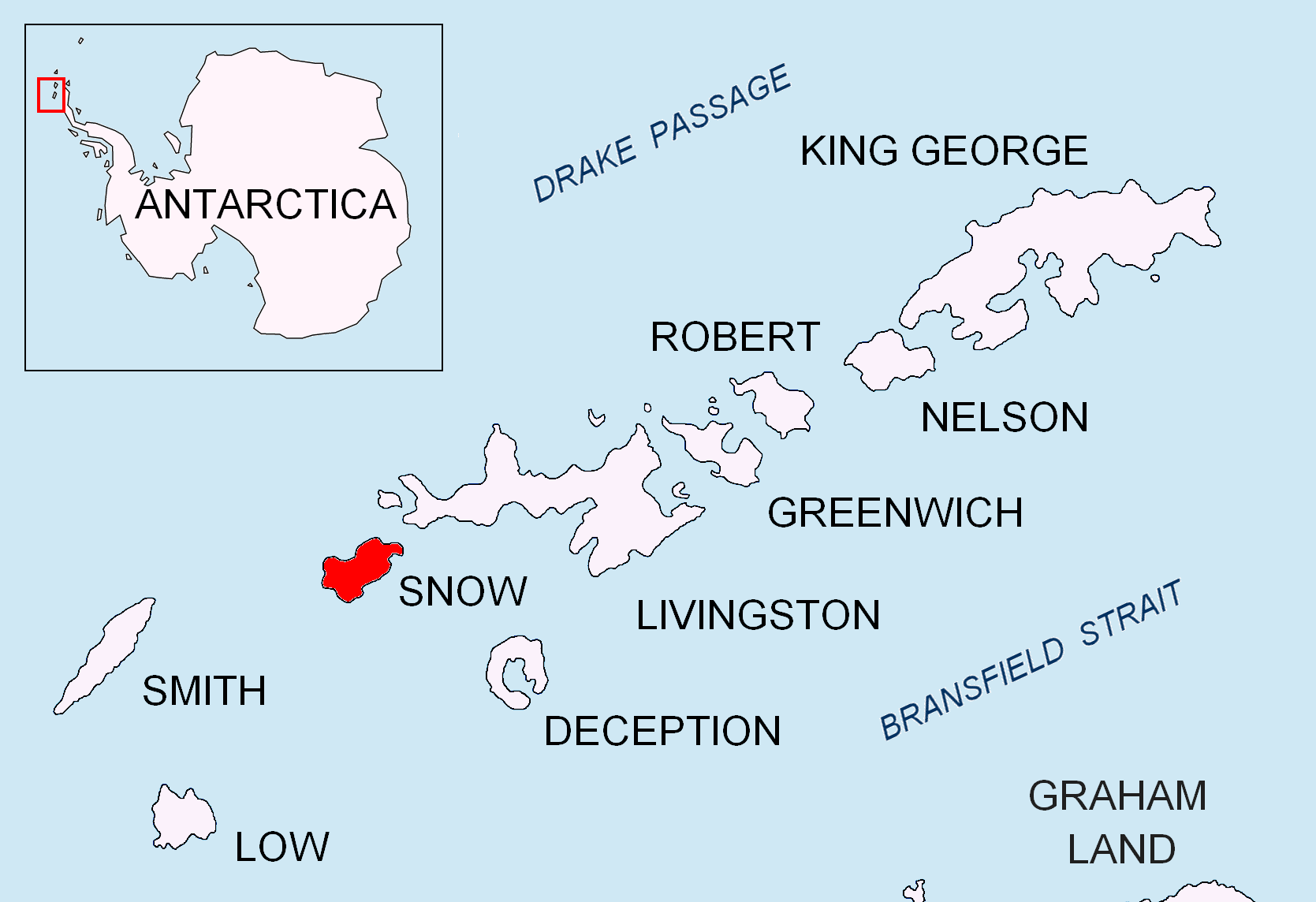
- Location of Snow Island in the South Shetland Islands

- Location within South Shetland Islands Location within Antarctic Peninsula Location within Antarctica
- Interactive map of Domino Lake
- Location: Aktinia Beach, Snow Island, South Shetland Islands
- Coordinates: 62°49′48.5″S 61°28′17.5″W
- Type: Lake
- Basin countries: Antarctica
- Max. length: 308 m (1,010 ft)
- Max. width: 67 m (220 ft)
- Surface area: 1.33 ha (3.3 acres)

Domino Lake (Bulgarian: езеро Доминото, romanized: ezero Dominoto, IPA: ['ɛzɛro 'dɔminoto]) is the 308 m (1,010 ft) long in southeast–northwest direction and 67 m (220 ft) wide lake on Aktinia Beach, Snow Island in the South Shetland Islands, Antarctica. It has a surface area of 1.33 ha (3.3 acres) and is separated from the waters of Boyd Strait by a 20 to 42 m (66 to 138 ft) wide strip of land. The area was visited by early 19th century sealers.

The feature is so named because of its shape supposedly resembling a domino mask.

== Location ==
Topographic map of Livingston, Greenwich, Robert, Snow and Smith Islands

Domino Lake is situated on the southeast side of Rebrovo Point, which is 2.5 km (1.6 mi) northwest of Cape Conway and 3.1 km (1.9 mi) southeast of Monroe Point. British mapping of the area in 1968 and Bulgarian in 2009.

== Maps ==
- Livingston Island to King George Island. Scale 1:200000. Admiralty Nautical Chart 1776. Taunton: UK Hydrographic Office, 1968
- South Shetland Islands. Scale 1:200000 topographic map. DOS 610 Sheet W 62 60. Tolworth, UK, 1968
- L.L. Ivanov. Antarctica: Livingston Island and Greenwich, Robert, Snow and Smith Islands. Scale 1:120000 topographic map. Troyan: Manfred Wörner Foundation, 2009. ISBN 978-954-92032-6-4
- Antarctic Digital Database (ADD). Scale 1:250000 topographic map of Antarctica. Scientific Committee on Antarctic Research (SCAR). Since 1993, regularly upgraded and updated
