= Vokil Point =

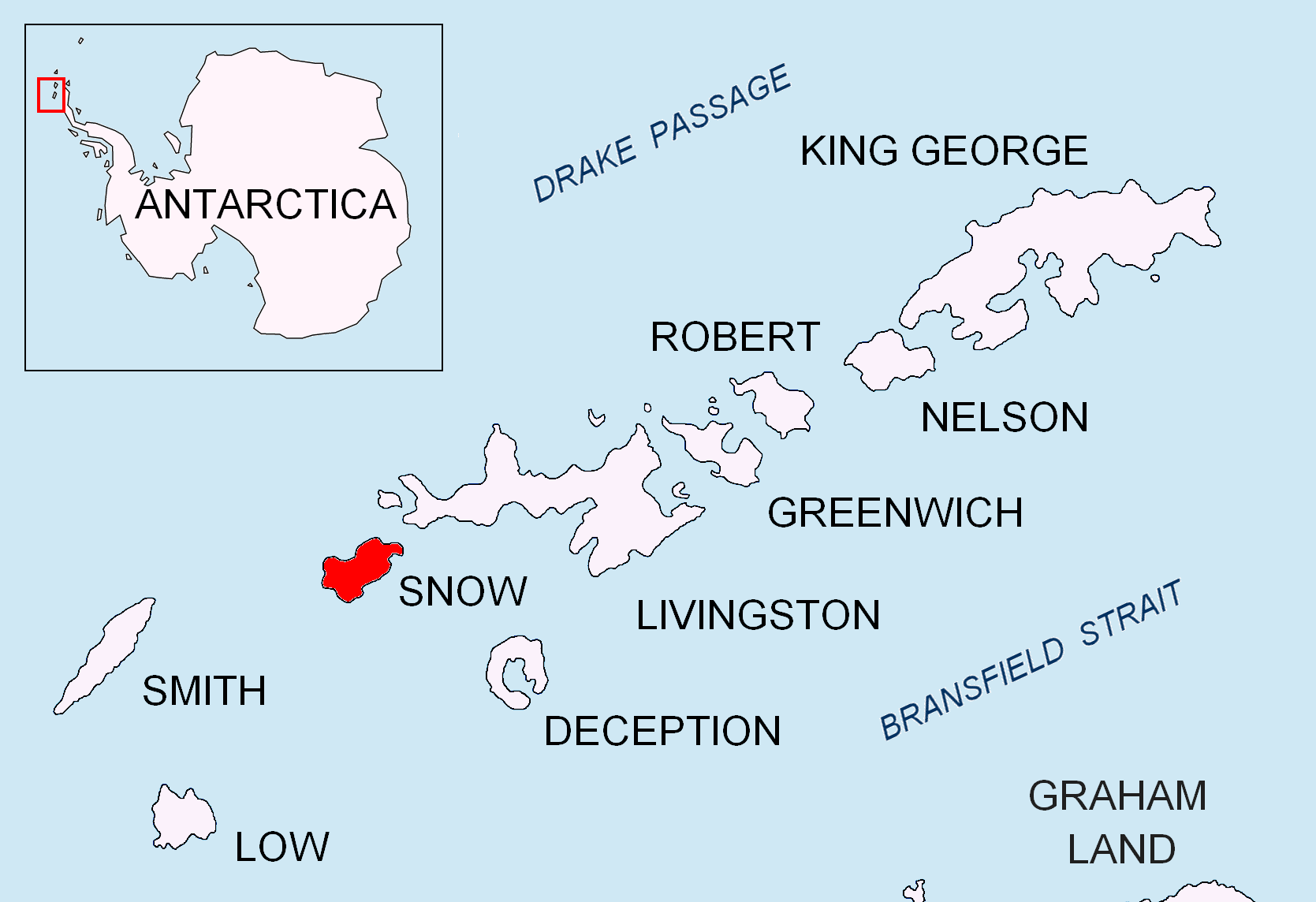
Location of Snow Island in the South Shetland Islands.

Topographic map of Livingston Island, Greenwich, Robert, Snow and Smith Islands.

Vokil Point (Bulgarian: нос Вокил, ‘Nos Vokil’ \'nos vo-'kil\) is a point on the southwest coast of Snow Island in the South Shetland Islands, Antarctica projecting 300 m into Boyd Strait and forming the north side of the entrance to Barutin Cove.

The feature is named after the Bulgarian ruling dynasty of Vokil (8th century).

== Location ==
Vokil Point is located at 62°47′33″S 61°31′10″W, which is 2 km south of Esteverena Point and 2 km north of Monroe Point (Bulgarian mapping in 2009).

== Map ==
- L.L. Ivanov. Antarctica: Livingston Island and Greenwich, Robert, Snow and Smith Islands. Scale 1:120000 topographic map. Troyan: Manfred Wörner Foundation, 2009. ISBN 978-954-92032-6-4
