= Ogygia Island =

Antarctic island

- Topographic map of Livingston, Greenwich, Robert, Snow and Smith Islands featuring Ogygia Island

- Location within Antarctica Location within South Shetland Islands

Geography
- Location: Antarctica
- Coordinates: 62°46′34″S 61°14′15″W
- Archipelago: South Shetland Islands
- Area: 2 ha (4.9 acres)
- Length: 420 m (1380 ft)
- Width: 70 m (230 ft)

Administration
- Administered under the Antarctic Treaty System

Demographics
- Population: uninhabited

Ogygia Island (Bulgarian: остров Огигия, romanized: ostrov Ogygia, IPA: [ˈɔstrof oˈɟiɟjɐ]) is the 420 m long in west-east direction and 70 m wide rocky island separated by a 110 m wide passage from Hall Peninsula on the east side of Snow Island in the South Shetland Islands. Surface area 2 ha. It is part of the southwest coast of Ivaylo Cove. The area was visited by early 19th century sealers.

The feature is named after the mythical island Ogygia, home of the nymph Calypso.

== Location ==
Ogygia Island is located at 62°46′34″S 61°14′15″W, which is 580 m south of Trapecio Island, 6 km south-southwest of the northeast extremity of President Head, 12.15 km northeast of Cape Conway and 29.8 km northwest of Deception Island. Bulgarian mapping in 2009 and 2017.

== Maps ==
- L. Ivanov. Antarctica: Livingston Island and Greenwich, Robert, Snow and Smith Islands. Scale 1:120000 topographic map. Troyan: Manfred Wörner Foundation, 2010. ISBN 978-954-92032-9-5 (First edition 2009. ISBN 978-954-92032-6-4)
- L. Ivanov. Antarctica: Livingston Island and Smith Island. Scale 1:100000 topographic map. Manfred Wörner Foundation, 2017. ISBN 978-619-90008-3-0
- Antarctic Digital Database (ADD). Scale 1:250000 topographic map of Antarctica. Scientific Committee on Antarctic Research (SCAR). Since 1993, regularly upgraded and updated

== See also ==
- List of Antarctic and subantarctic islands
