= Cacho Island =

Antarctic island

- Topographic map of Livingston, Greenwich, Robert, Snow and Smith Islands; Cacho Island is shown as linked to Snow Island by a tiny isthmus that exists no longer

- Location within Antarctica Location within South Shetland Islands

Geography
- Location: Antarctica
- Coordinates: 62°49′57.4″S 61°28′35″W
- Archipelago: South Shetland Islands
- Area: 19 ha (47 acres)
- Length: 750 m (2460 ft)
- Width: 350 m (1150 ft)

Administration
- Administered under the Antarctic Treaty System

Demographics
- Population: uninhabited

Cacho Island (Bulgarian: остров Качо, romanized: ostrov Cacho, IPA: [ˈɔstrof ˈkat͡ʃo]) is the conspicuous 750 m long (250 m in east–west direction) and 350 m wide (100 m in north-south direction) rocky island separated by a 160 m wide passage from Aktinia Beach on the southwest coast of Snow Island in the South Shetland Islands. Surface area 1.63 ha. The area was visited by early 19th century sealers.

The feature is named after the Spanish physicist, polar explorer and author Javier Cacho Gómez, participant in the 1986/87 Spanish Antarctic expedition and base commander at Juan Carlos I base in subsequent seasons, for his contribution to the promotion of Antarctica and support for the Bulgarian Antarctic programme.

== Location ==
Cacho Island is located at 62°49′57.4″S 61°28′35″W, which is 315 m south of Rebrovo Point and 2.5 km west-northwest of Cape Conway. Bulgarian mapping in 2009.

== Maps ==
- South Shetland Islands. Scale 1:200000 topographic map. DOS 610 Sheet W 62 60. Tolworth, UK, 1968
- L. Ivanov. Antarctica: Livingston Island and Greenwich, Robert, Snow and Smith Islands. Scale 1:120000 topographic map. Troyan: Manfred Wörner Foundation, 2010. ISBN 978-954-92032-9-5 (First edition 2009. ISBN 978-954-92032-6-4)
- Antarctic Digital Database (ADD). Scale 1:250000 topographic map of Antarctica. Scientific Committee on Antarctic Research (SCAR). Since 1993, regularly upgraded and updated

== See also ==
- List of Antarctic and subantarctic islands
