= Aktinia Beach =

Beach in Antarctica

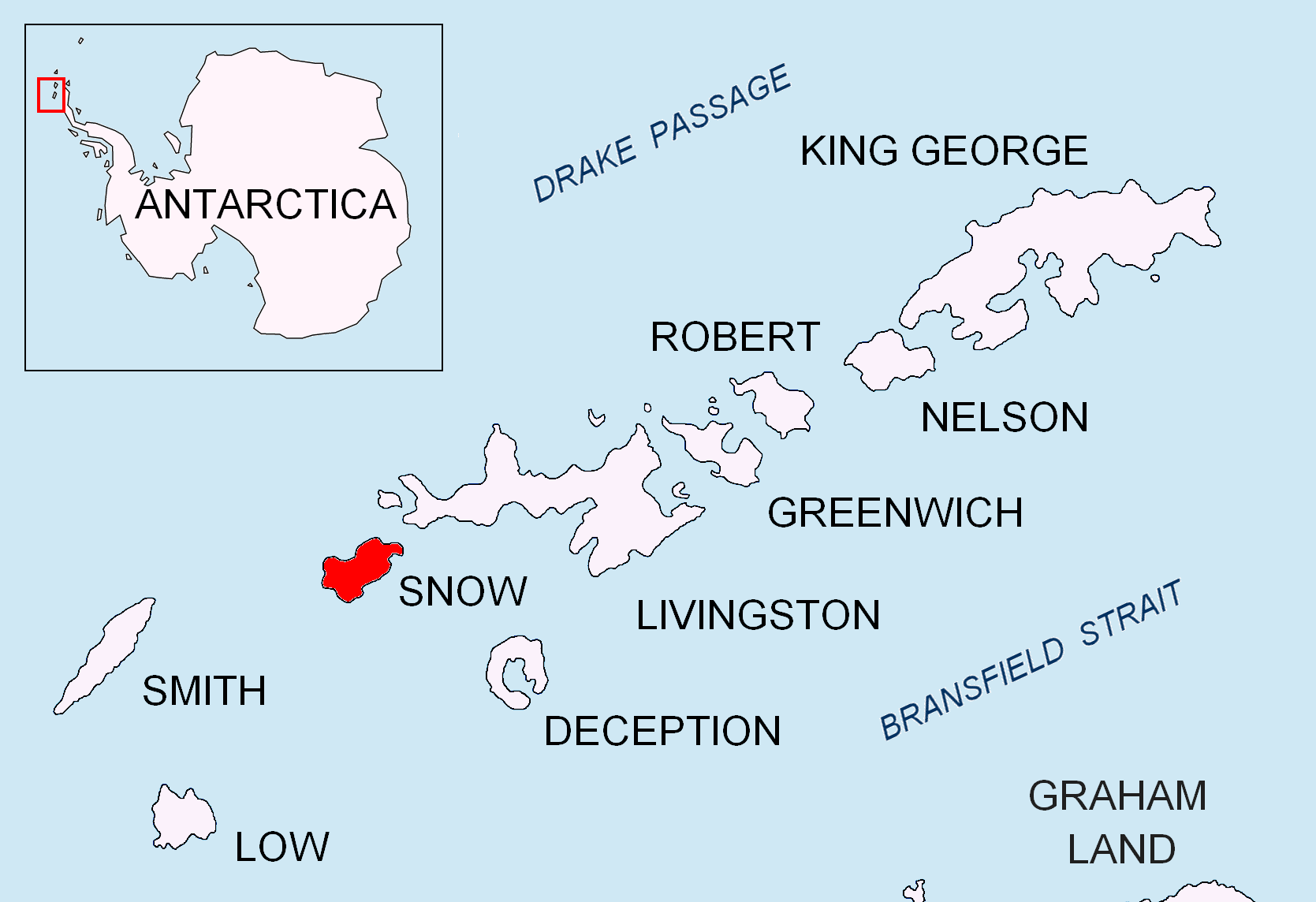
Location of Snow Island in the South Shetland Islands

Topographic map of Livingston, Greenwich, Robert, Snow and Smith Islands

Aktinia Beach (Bulgarian: бряг Актиния, romanized: bryag Aktinia, IPA: [ˈbrʲak ɐkˈtinijɐ]) is the mostly ice-free 2.7 km long and 400 m wide beach extending on both sides of Rebrovo Point on the southwest coast of Snow Island facing Boyd Strait in the South Shetland Islands, Antarctica. The area was visited by early 19th century sealers.

The beach is “named after the ocean fishing trawler Aktinia of the Bulgarian company Ocean Fisheries – Burgas that operated in Antarctic waters off South Georgia and the South Orkney Islands during its fishing trip under Captain Hristo Haralambiev in the 1979/80 season. The Bulgarian fishermen, along with those of the Soviet Union, Poland and East Germany are the pioneers of modern Antarctic fishing industry.”

== Location ==
Aktinia Beach is centred at 62°49′50″S 61°27′50″W, which is 2.18 km northwest of Cape Conway and 3.4 km southeast of Monroe Point. Bulgarian mapping in 2009.

== Maps ==
- L.L. Ivanov. Antarctica: Livingston Island and Greenwich, Robert, Snow and Smith Islands. Scale 1:120000 topographic map. Troyan: Manfred Wörner Foundation, 2009.
- Antarctic Digital Database (ADD). Scale 1:250000 topographic map of Antarctica. Scientific Committee on Antarctic Research (SCAR). Since 1993, regularly upgraded and updated.
