= Esteverena Point =

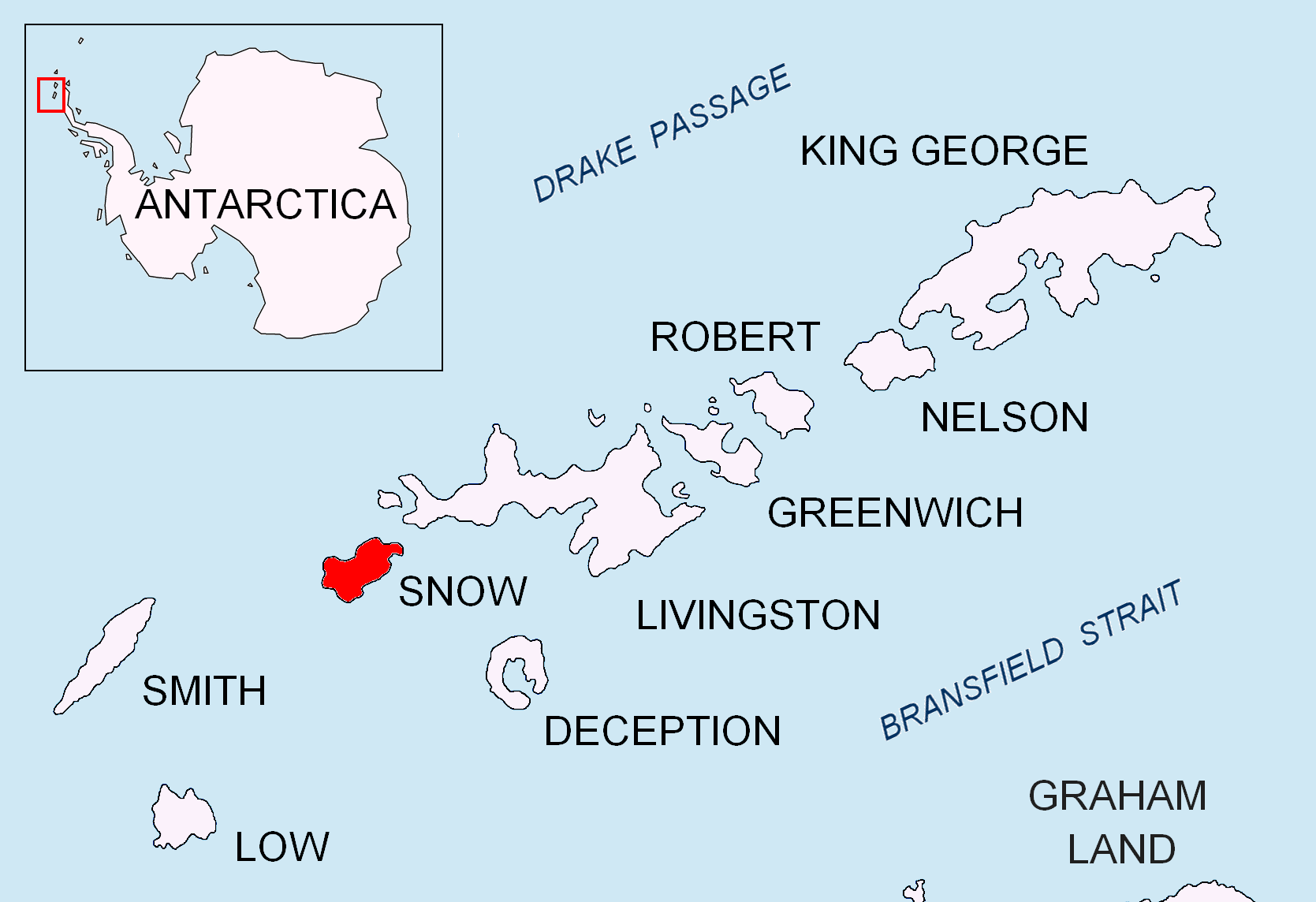
Location of Snow Island in the South Shetland Islands.

Topographic map of Livingston Island, Greenwich, Robert, Snow and Smith Islands.

Esteverena Point is the rocky point projecting 700 m into Boyd Strait to form the west extremity of Snow Island in the South Shetland Islands, Antarctica. The feature is named by Argentina.

== Location ==
The cape is located at 62°46′30″S 61°31′53″W which is 2.89 km south-southwest of Byewater Point, 9.08 km north-northwest of Cape Conway, 4.1 km north by west of Monroe Point and 40.64 km east-northeast of Cape Smith, Smith Island (British mapping in 1968, Argentine in 1980, and Bulgarian in 2009).

== Map ==
- L.L. Ivanov. Antarctica: Livingston Island and Greenwich, Robert, Snow and Smith Islands. Scale 1:120000 topographic map. Troyan: Manfred Wörner Foundation, 2009. ISBN 978-954-92032-6-4
