= The Mysterious Island (1905 film) =

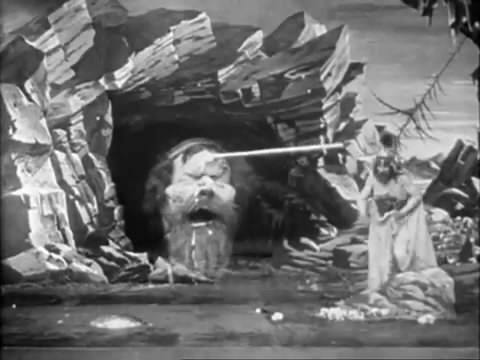
- A frame from the film
- Directed by: Georges Méliès
- Starring: Georges Méliès
- Production company: Star Film Company
- Release date: 1905
- Country: France
- Language: Silent

The Mysterious Island (French: L'Île de Calypso, literally "Calypso's Island"), sometimes advertised with the subtitle Ulysse et le géant Polyphème ("Odysseus and the Giant Polyphemus"), is a 1905 French short silent film by Georges Méliès. It was sold by Méliès's Star Film Company and is numbered 750–752 in its catalogues. The film is four minutes long.

Méliès plays Odysseus in the film, which is based on two completely separate scenes from the Odyssey, combining Ogygia, Calypso's island in the Ionian Sea, with Polyphemus's cave near Mount Etna in Sicily. The film's special effects are worked with stage machinery, multiple exposures, substitution splices, and dissolves. Polyphemus's eye is puppeteered with two strings, while the giant arm is probably Méliès's own.
