= Hall Peninsula, Snow Island =

Peninsula in Antarctica

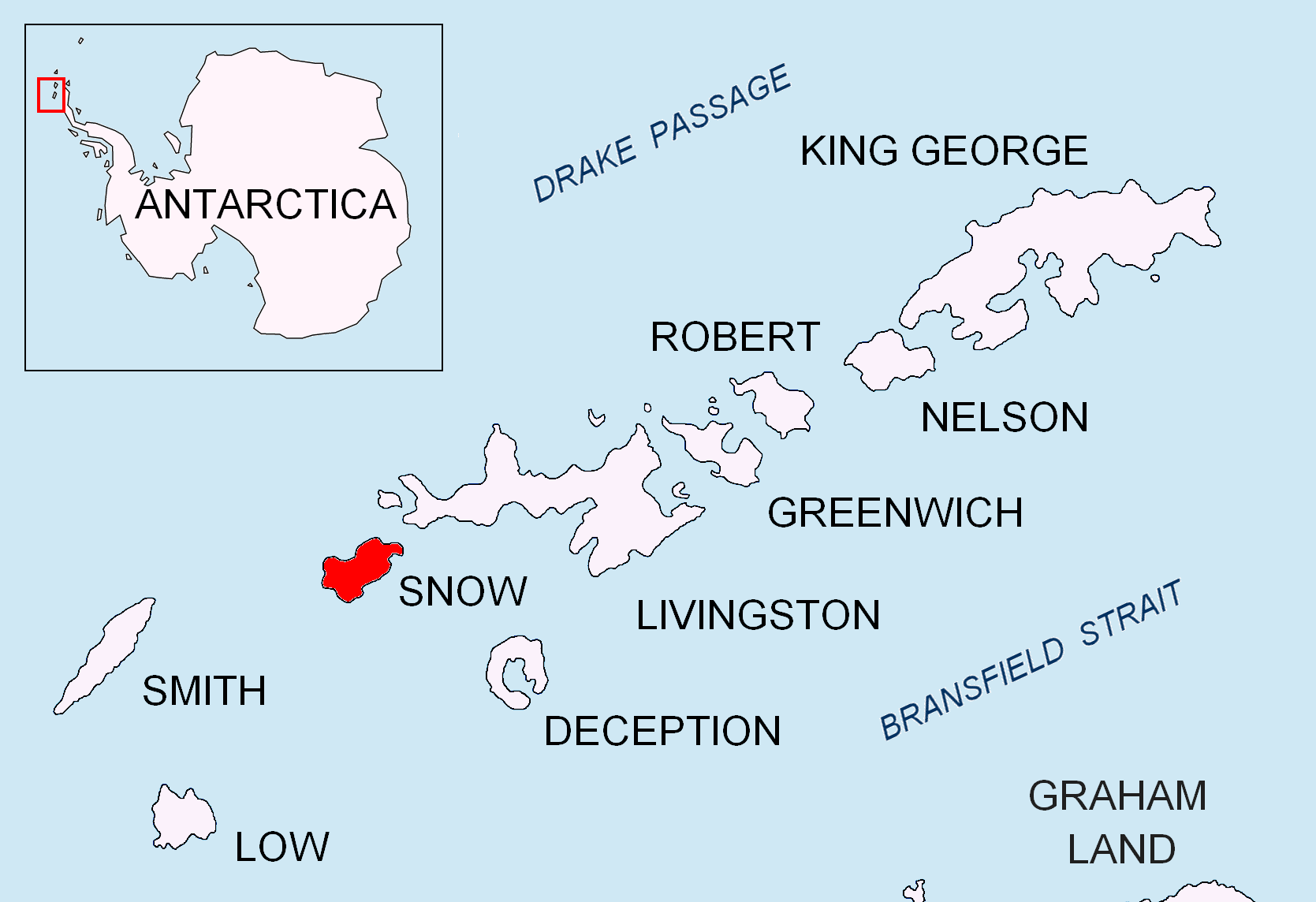
Location of Snow Island in the South Shetland Islands.

Topographic map of Livingston Island, Greenwich, Robert, Snow and Smith Islands.

Hall Peninsula is a small ice-free peninsula on the southeast coast of Snow Island in the South Shetland Islands, Antarctica. The feature is scissors shaped with its north and south arms extending 800 m including Cacho Island and 750 m including Ogygia Island respectively, with Ivaylo Cove lying in between. The area was visited by early 19th century sealers.

The peninsula is named after Captain Basil Hall, RN (1788–1844), a name originally applied by James Weddell to Snow Island.

== Location ==
The peninsula is centred at 62°46′04.7″S 61°14′36.3″W which is 12.48 km northeast of Cape Conway and 5.08 km south-southwest of President Head (British mapping in 1825 and 1968, and Bulgarian in 2009).

== Map ==
- L.L. Ivanov. Antarctica: Livingston Island and Greenwich, Robert, Snow and Smith Islands. Scale 1:120000 topographic map. Troyan: Manfred Wörner Foundation, 2009. ISBN 978-954-92032-6-4
