= Nausinous =

Character in Greek mythology

In Greek mythology, Nausinous /ˌnɔːˈsɪnoʊəs/ (Ancient Greek: Ναυσίνοος, romanized: Nausinoos) was the son of Odysseus and Calypso. In Theogony by Hesiod, he is said to have a brother named Nausithous.

== Mythology ==
While stranded on Ogygia, Odysseus was forced to become the lover of Calypso. According to Hesiod, this union resulted in two sons, named Nausinous and Nausithous. Neither Nausinous nor his brother are mentioned in Homer's Odyssey.
