= Rebrovo Point =

Point in Antarctica

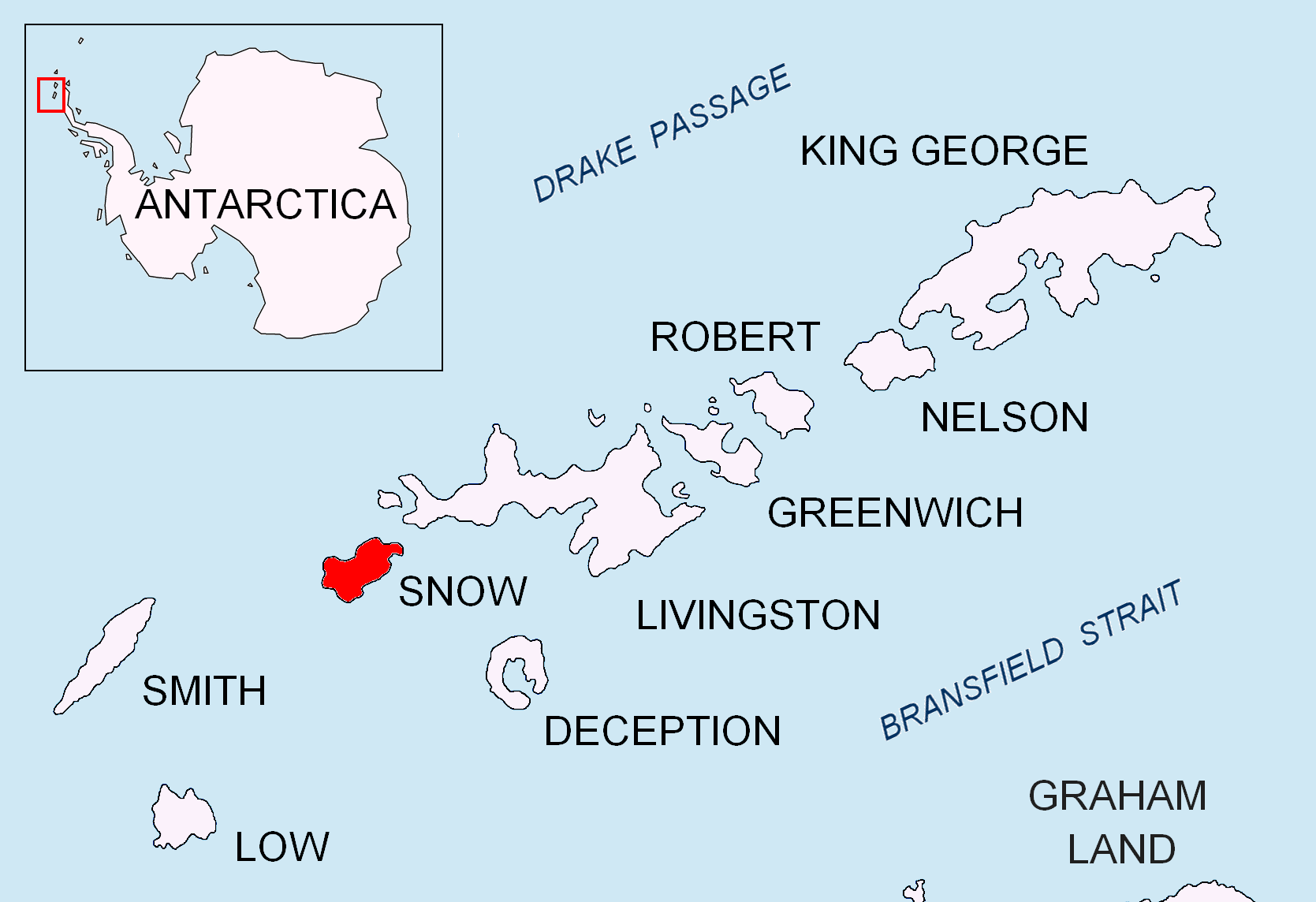
Location of Snow Island in the South Shetland Islands.

Topographic map of Livingston Island, Greenwich, Robert, Snow and Smith Islands.

Rebrovo Point (Bulgarian: нос Реброво, ‘Nos Rebrovo’ \'nos re-'bro-vo\) is a point on Aktinia Beach on the southwest coast of Snow Island in the South Shetland Islands, Antarctica projecting 200 m into Boyd Strait. It is situated 2.8 km southeast of Monroe Point and 2.8 km northwest of Cape Conway, and is snow-free in summer.

The point is named after the settlement of Rebrovo in western Bulgaria.

== Location ==
Rebrovo Point is located at 62°49′44″S 61°28′31″W. Bulgarian mapping in 2009.

== Map ==
- L.L. Ivanov. Antarctica: Livingston Island and Greenwich, Robert, Snow and Smith Islands. Scale 1:120000 topographic map. Troyan: Manfred Wörner Foundation, 2009. ISBN 978-954-92032-6-4
