= Nausithous =

Name in Greek mythology

The name Nausithous (/ˌnɔːˈsɪθoʊəs/; Ancient Greek: Ναυσίθοος, romanized: Nausíthoos, lit. 'swift ship' or 'fast-sailing') is shared by the following characters in Greek mythology:

- Nausithous, the king of the Phaeacians who reigned in the generation before Odysseus washed ashore on their home island of Scherie (his son Alcinous was king at the time of Odysseus's arrival). He was the son of the god Poseidon and Periboea, the daughter of the Giant king Eurymedon. According to Homer, Nausithous led a migration of Phaeacians from Hypereia to the island of Scheria in order to escape the lawless Cyclopes. He is the father of Alcinous and Rhexenor. Alcinous would go on to marry his niece, Rhexenor's daughter Arete. One source relates that Heracles came to Nausithous to get cleansed after the murder of his children; during his stay in the land of the Phaeacians, the hero fell in love with the nymph Melite who eventually conceived a son Hyllus to him.
- Nausithous, a Salaminian pilot of the Athenian ship that carried Theseus and the youths to Crete to confront the Minotaur. In another account, the helmsman was called Phereclus. Nausithous and the look-out man Phaeax were given by Scirus of Salamis as a favour to the hero since Scirus' grandson Menesthes was one of the chosen youths. This is supported by the heroons for Nausithous and Phaeax which Theseus built at Phalerum near the sanctuary of Scirus, and they say that the festival of the Cybernesia or Pilot's Festival is celebrated in their honour.
- Nausithous, one of the two sons born to Odysseus by Calypso, the other one being Nausinous. According to Hyginus, Nausithous was a son of Odysseus and Circe; his brother was Telegonus.
