= Phereclus (mythology) =

Ancient Greek male name

In Greek mythology, Phereclus or Phereclos (Ancient Greek: Φέρεκλος, romanized: Phéreklos, lit. 'bringing glory' or 'bearer of fame') may refer to the following characters:

- Phereclus, son of Amarsyas. He served as the pilot of the Athenian ship that carried Theseus and the youths to Crete to confront the Minotaur. In another account, the helmsman was called Nausithous.
- Phereclus, a soldier in the army of the Seven Against Thebes. His form was taken by Tisiphone, one of the Erinyes, to speak to King Adrastus of Argos.
- Phereclus, a Trojan shipwright who was skilled in all manner of cunning workmanship.
