= Calypso's Cave =

Cave in Malta

Coordinates: 36°3′37.74″N 14°16′33.86″E

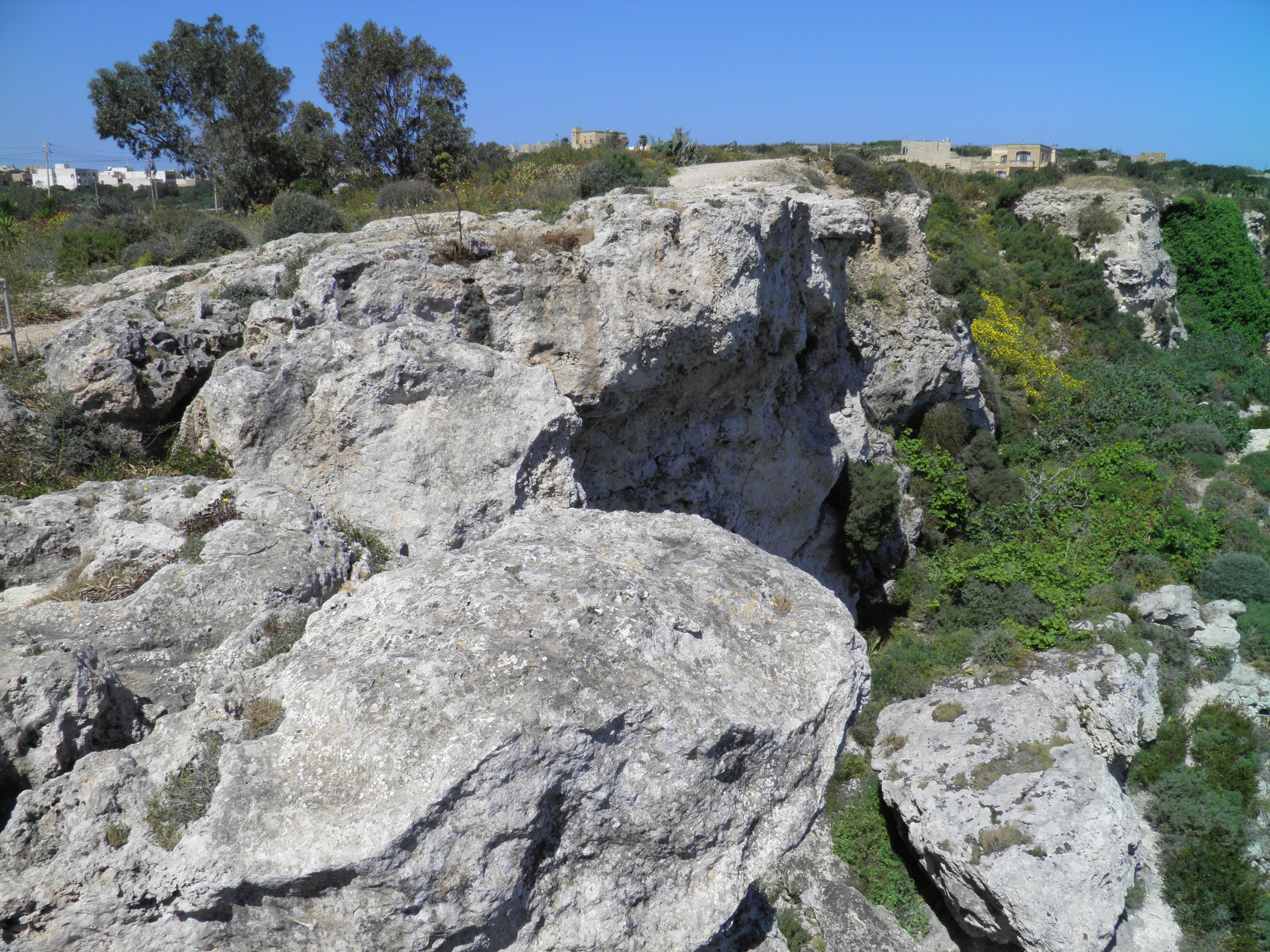
- A crevice that leads inside the cave

- Location within Malta Location within Europe
- Location: Gozo, Malta
- Depth: 0 ft
- Elevation: 253 feet (77 m)
- Entrances: 1
- Translation: L-ghar ta' Callisso (Maltese)

Calypso's Cave (Maltese: L-Għar ta' Calisso) is a natural cave, located on the western side of the Ramla bay, near the town of Xagħra, on the island of Gozo. The cave is alleged to be the one referenced in the Odyssey as the cave where the nymph Calypso kept Odysseus prisoner for seven years after his ship was wrecked after a fierce storm. The cave was closed to the public for fear of collapse, but has reopened. The cave is commonly confused with Tal' Mixta Cave, which is located on the other side of the bay, within the confines of the Nadur local council.
