= Ivaylo Cove =

Cove in Antarctica

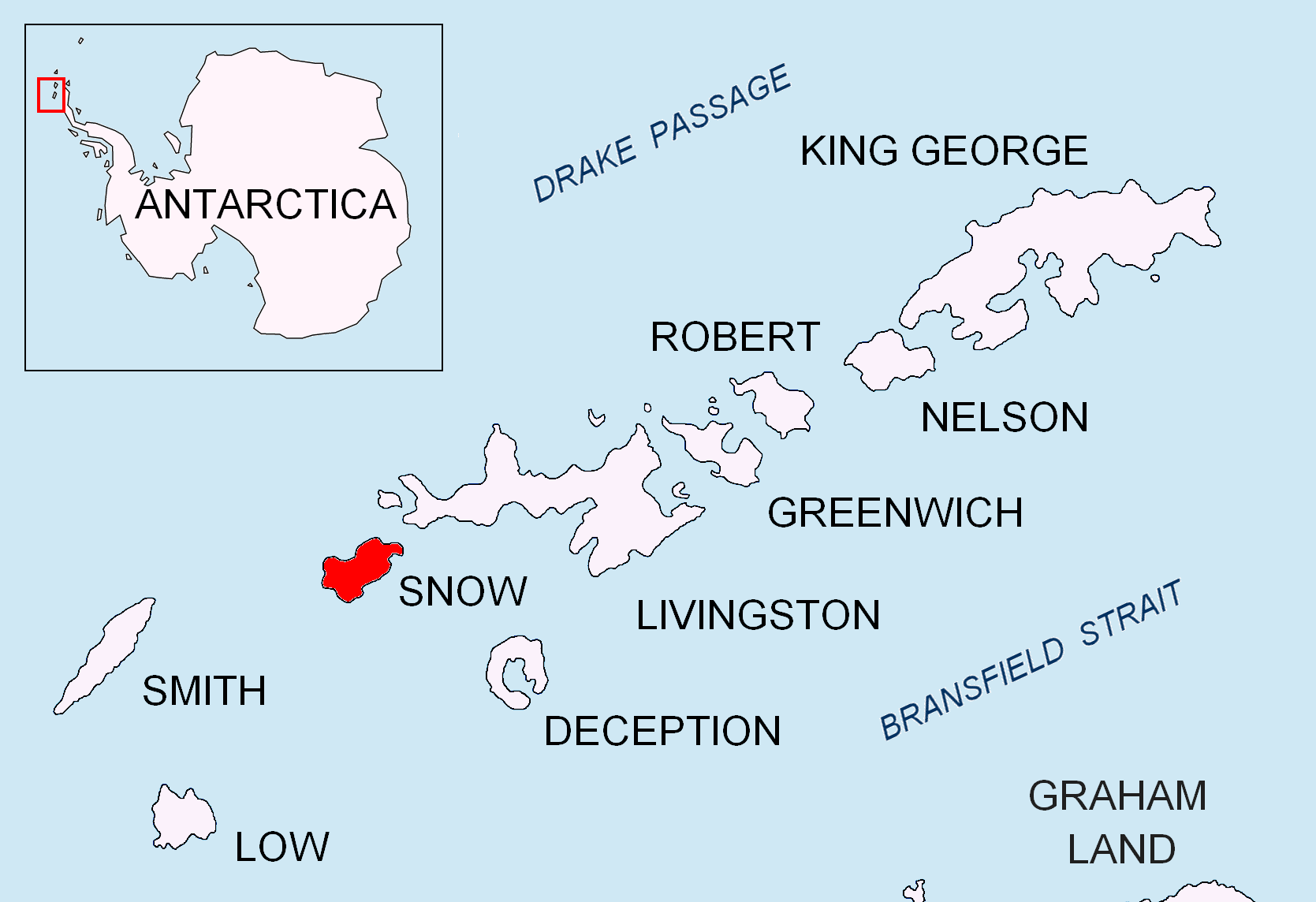
Location of Snow Island in the South Shetland Islands.

Topographic map of Livingston Island, Greenwich, Robert, Snow and Smith Islands.

Ivaylo Cove (Bulgarian: Ивайлов залив, ‘Ivaylov Zaliv’ \i-'vay-lov 'za-liv\) is the 500 m wide cove indenting for 900 m the east coast of Snow Island in the South Shetland Islands, Antarctica. It is bounded by the small Hall Peninsula on the west and southwest, Ogygia Island on the south and Trapecio Island on the northeast. The area was visited by early 19th century sealers.

The cove is named after Czar Ivaylo of Bulgaria, 1277–1279.

== Location ==
Ivaylo Cove is centred at 62°46′14″S 61°14′46″W. British mapping in 1968, Bulgarian in 2009.

== Maps ==
- L.L. Ivanov. Antarctica: Livingston Island and Greenwich, Robert, Snow and Smith Islands. Scale 1:120000 topographic map. Troyan: Manfred Wörner Foundation, 2009. ISBN 978-954-92032-6-4
- Antarctic Digital Database (ADD). Scale 1:250000 topographic map of Antarctica. Scientific Committee on Antarctic Research (SCAR). Since 1993, regularly upgraded and updated.
- L.L. Ivanov. Antarctica: Livingston Island and Smith Island. Scale 1:100000 topographic map. Manfred Wörner Foundation, 2017. ISBN 978-619-90008-3-0
