= Mixta Cave =

Cave in Malta

- Tal-Mixta Cave
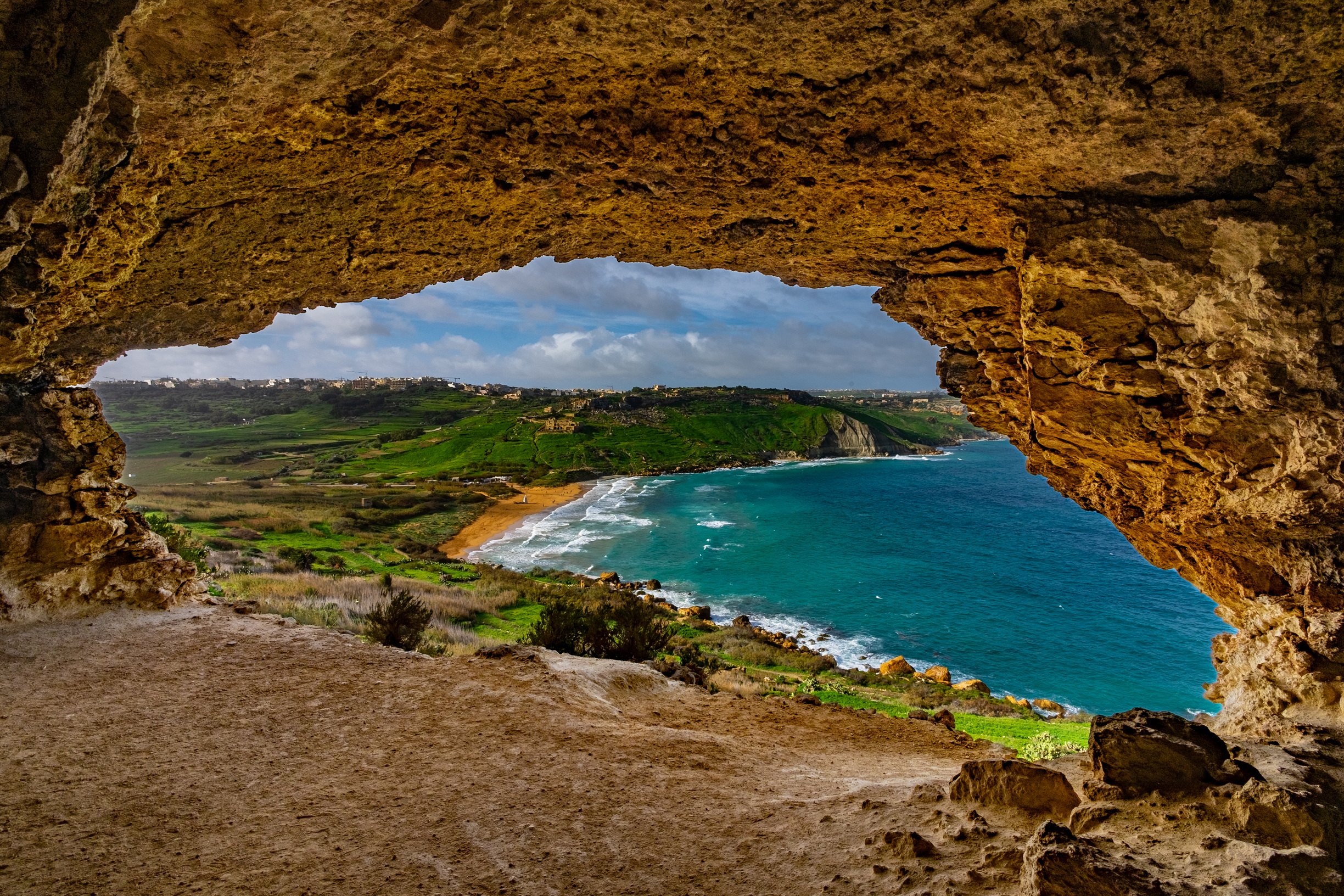
- Ramla Bay as viewed from inside the cave

- Location within Malta
- Interactive map of Mixta Cave
- Coordinates: 36°3′48.03″N 14°17′22.05″E
- Elevation: 224 feet (68 m)
- Entrances: 1
- Translation: L-ghar ta' Mixta (Maltese)

Mixta Cave (Maltese: L-għar ta' Mixta) is a natural cave located on the eastern side of Ramla Bay. It is very commonly confused with Calypso's Cave which is located on the other side of the same bay. It has become increasingly crowded by both Maltese nationals and tourists raising ecological concerns.
