= Barutin Cove =

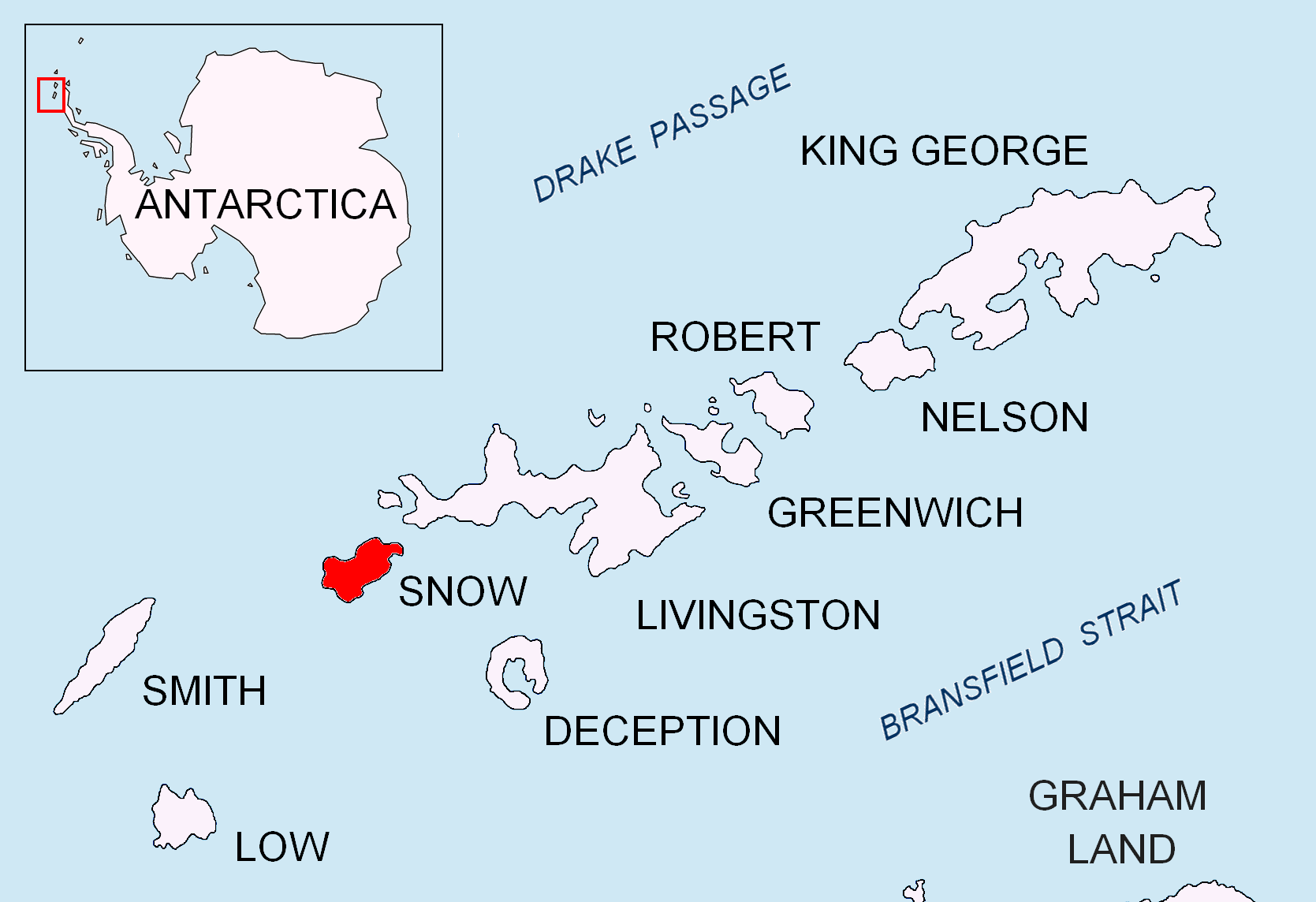
Location of Snow Island in the South Shetland Islands.

Topographic map of Livingston Island, Greenwich, Robert, Snow and Smith Islands.

Barutin Cove (Bulgarian: залив Барутин, ‘Zaliv Barutin’ \'za-liv 'ba-ru-tin\) is the 2.05 km wide cove indenting for 1.03 km the southwest coast of Snow Island in the South Shetland Islands, Antarctica. It is entered north of Monroe Point and south of Vokil Point. The cove's shape is enhanced as a result of glacier retreat in the late 20th and early 21st century.

The feature is named after the settlement of Barutin in southern Bulgaria.

== Location ==
Barutin Cove is located at 62°48′10″S 61°30′30″W. Bulgarian mapping in 2009.

== Maps ==
- L.L. Ivanov. Antarctica: Livingston Island and Greenwich, Robert, Snow and Smith Islands. Scale 1:120000 topographic map. Troyan: Manfred Wörner Foundation, 2009. ISBN 978-954-92032-6-4 (Updated second edition 2010. ISBN 978-954-92032-9-5)
- Antarctic Digital Database (ADD). Scale 1:250000 topographic map of Antarctica. Scientific Committee on Antarctic Research (SCAR). Since 1993, regularly upgraded and updated.
