= Ogygia =

Island home of Calypso in Homer's Odyssey

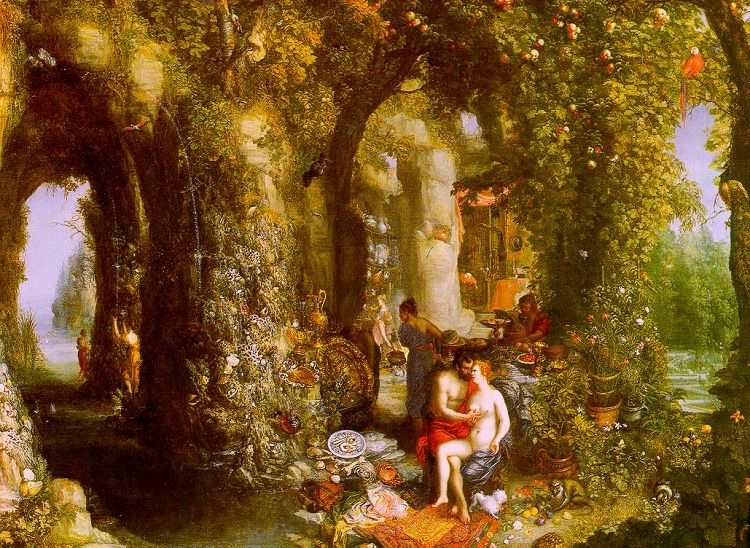
Odysseus and Calypso in the caves of Ogygia. Painting by Jan Brueghel the Elder (1568–1625)

Ogygia (/oʊˈdʒɪdʒiə/; Ancient Greek: Ὠγυγίη, romanized: Ōgygíē [ɔːɡyɡíɛː], or Ὠγυγία Ōgygíā [ɔːɡyɡíaː]) is an island mentioned in Homer's Odyssey, Book V, as the home of the nymph Calypso, the daughter of the Titan Atlas. In Homer's Odyssey, Calypso detained Odysseus on Ogygia for seven years and kept him from returning to his home of Ithaca, wanting to marry him.

Athena complained about Calypso's actions to Zeus, who sent the messenger Hermes to Ogygia to order Calypso to release Odysseus. Hermes is Odysseus's great-grandfather on his mother's side, through Autolycos. Calypso finally, though reluctantly, instructed Odysseus to build a small raft, gave him food and wine, and let him depart the island.

The Odyssey describes Ogygia as follows:

...and he (Hermes) found her within. A great fire was burning in the hearth, and from afar over the isle there was a fragrance of cleft cedar and juniper as they burned. But she within was singing with a sweet voice as she went to and fro before the loom, weaving with a golden shuttle. Round about the cave grew a luxuriant wood, alder and poplar and sweet-smelling cypress, wherein birds long of wing were wont to nest, owls and falcons and sea-crows with chattering tongues, who ply their business on the sea. And right there about the hollow cave ran trailing a garden vine, in pride of its prime, richly laden with clusters. And fountains four in a row were flowing with bright water hard by one another, turned one this way, one that. And round about soft meadows of violets and parsley were blooming...

== Location ==
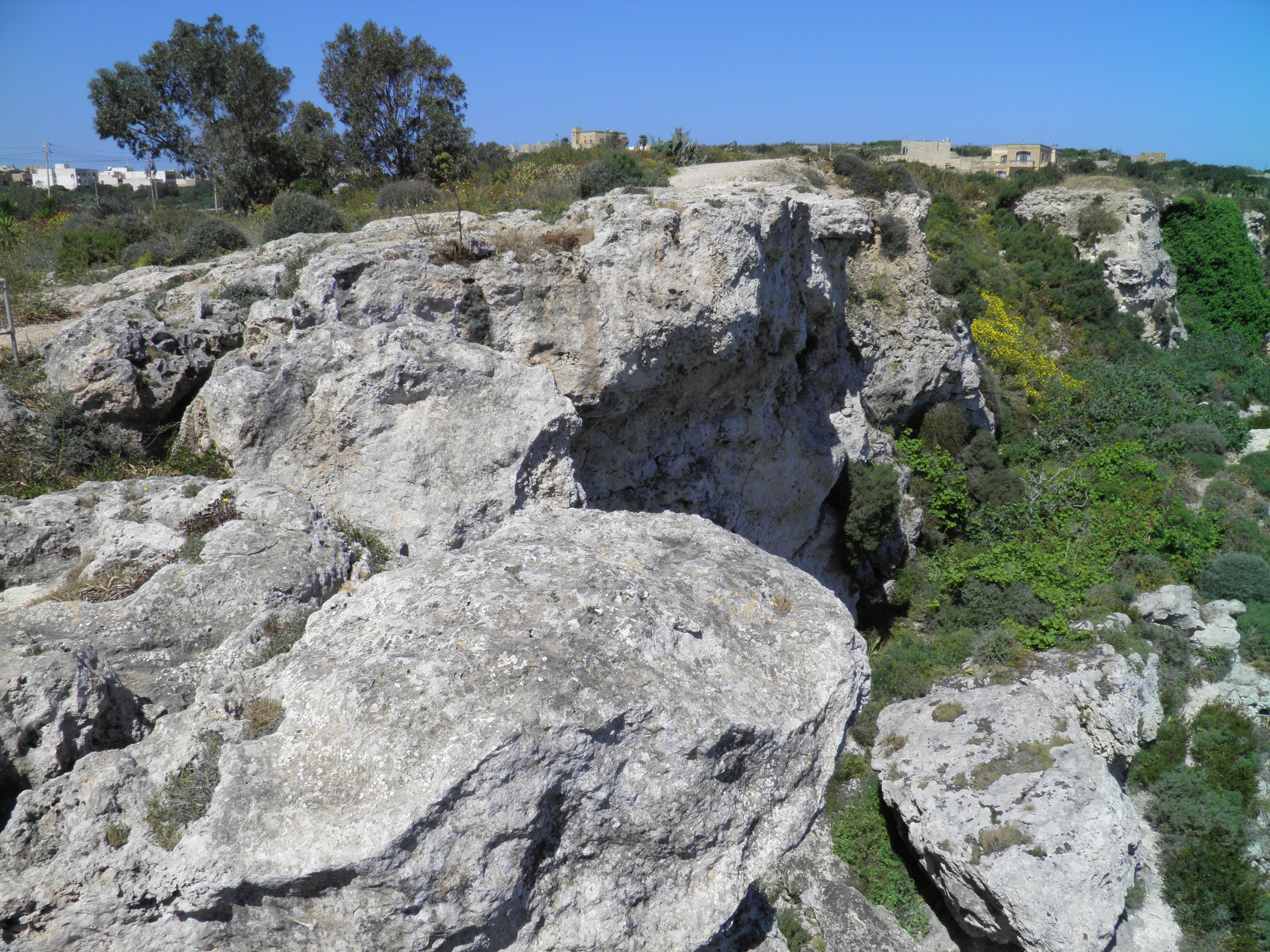
Calypso Cave in Xagħra, Gozo. According to Maltese tradition, this was the cave of Calypso and Odysseus.

A long-standing tradition begun by Euhemerus in the late 4th century BC and supported by Callimachus, endorsed by modern Maltese tradition, identifies Ogygia with the island of Gozo, the second-largest island in the Maltese archipelago.

Aeschylus calls the Nile Ogygian, and Eustathius, the Byzantine grammarian, said that Ogygia was the earliest name for Egypt, while other suggested locations for Ogygia include the Ionian Sea.

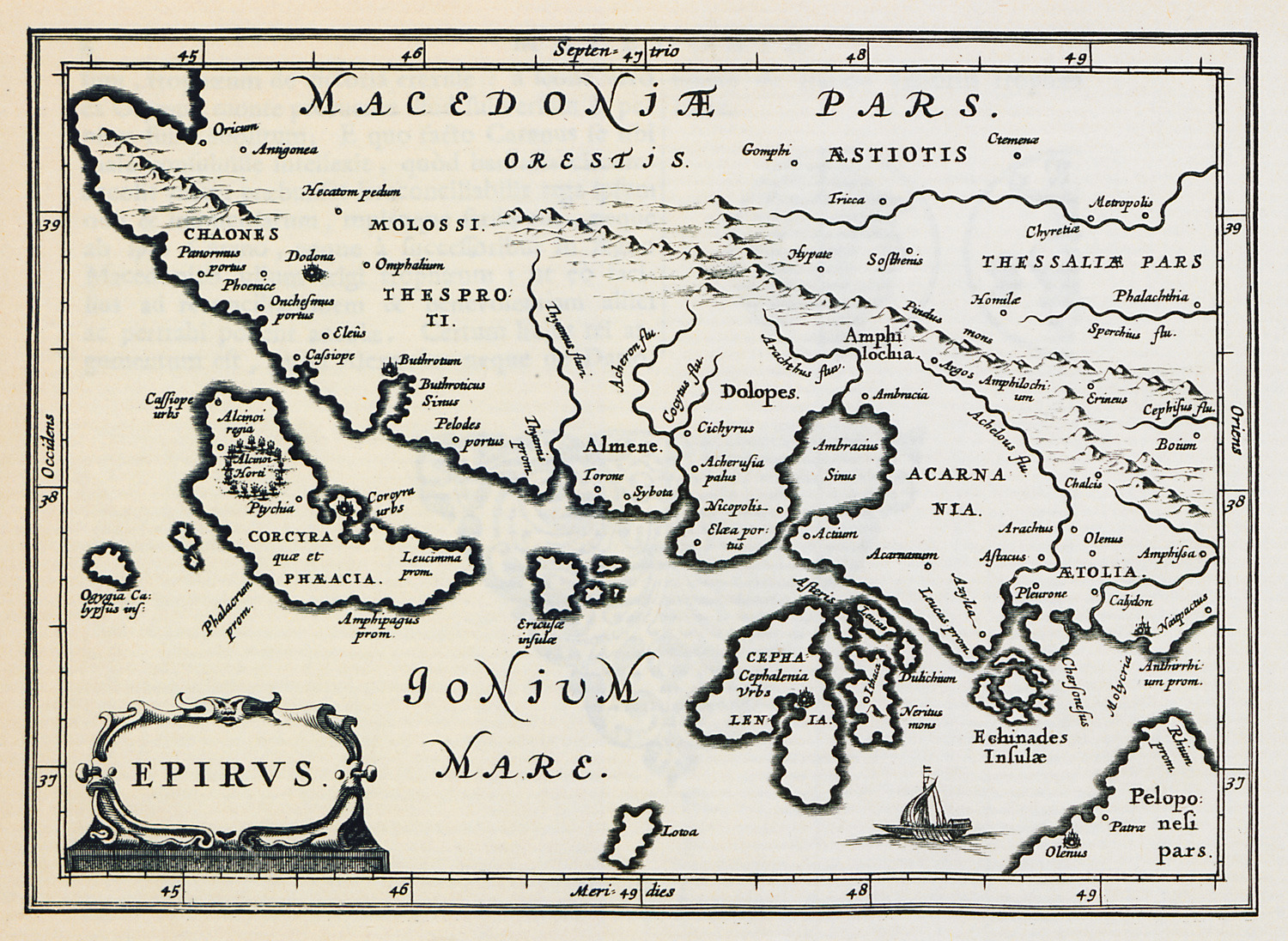
Map by Johann Lauremberg showing Othonoi Island as "Ogygia – Calypsus Island", 1661

Maps and written documents of historians and geographers like Jean-Baptiste Bourguignon d'Anville, Philipp Clüver, Petrus Bertius, Wilkie Collins, Alexander Beresford Hope, Alexander von Warsberg, François-René de Chateaubriand and Aaron Arrowsmith refer to Ogygia as an island northwest of Corfu, Ionian Islands, Greece, which adds fuel to modern Greek tradition that Ogygia is, indeed, the same island as the island of Othonoi.

Victor Bérard identified Perejil as the location of the mythical island of Ogygia.

== Geographical account by Strabo ==
Approximately seven centuries after Homer, the Alexandrian geographer Strabo criticized Polybius on the geography of the Odyssey. Strabo proposed that Scheria and Ogygia were located in the middle of the Atlantic Ocean.

At another instance he Polybius suppresses statements. For Homer says also, 'Now after the ship had left the river-stream of Oceanus', and, 'In the island of Ogygia, where is the navel of the sea', where the daughter of Atlas lives; and again, regarding the Phaiakians, 'Far apart we live in the wash of the waves, the farthermost of men, and no other mortals are conversant with us.' All these clearly suggest that he composed them to take place in the Atlantic Ocean."

== Geographical account by Plutarch ==
Plutarch also gives an account of the location of Ogygia:

First I will tell you the author of the piece, if there is no objection, who begins after Homer’s fashion with, an isle Ogygian lies far out at sea, distant five days’ sail from Britain, going westwards, and three others equally distant from it, and from each other, are more opposite to the summer visits of the sun; in one of which the barbarians fable that Cronus is imprisoned by Zeus, whilst his son lies by his side, as though keeping guard over those islands and the sea, which they call ‘the Sea of Cronus. The great continent by which the great sea is surrounded, they say, lies less distant from the others, but about five thousand stadia from Ogygia, for one sailing in a rowing-galley; for the sea is difficult of passage and muddy through the great number of currents, and these currents issue out of the great land, and shoals are formed by them, and the sea becomes clogged and full of earth, by which it has the appearance of being solid.

The passage of Plutarch has created some controversy. W. Hamilton indicated the similarities of Plutarch's account on "the great continent" and Plato's location of Atlantis in Timaeus 24E – 25A. Kepler in his Kepleri Astronomi Opera Omnia estimated that “the great continent” was America and attempted to locate Ogygia and the surrounding islands. Ruaidhrí Ó Flaithbheartaigh used Ogygia as a synonym for Ireland in the title of his Irish history, Ogygia: Seu Rerum Hibernicarum Chronologia ("Ogygia: Or a Chronological Account of Irish Events"), 1685. Wilhelm von Christ was convinced that the continent was America and states that in the 1st-century sailors traveling through Iceland, Greenland, and the Baffin Region (Qikiqtaaluk) reached the North American coast.

== Primeval Ogygia ==
Ogygia is associated with the Ogygian deluge and with the mythological figure Ogyges, in the sense that the word Ogygian means "primeval", "primal", and "at earliest dawn", which would suggest that Homer's Ogygia was a primeval island. However, Ogyges as a primeval, aboriginal ruler was usually sited in Boeotia, where he founded Thebes there, naming it Ogygia at the time. In another account of Ogyges, he brought his people to the area first known as Acte. That land was subsequently called Ogygia in his honor but ultimately known as Attica.

Ogygia is used by Roderick O'Flaherty as an allegory for Ireland in his book published in 1685 as Ogygia: seu Rerum Hibernicarum Chronologia & etc., in 1793 translated into English by Rev. James Hely, as "Ogygia, or a Chronological account of Irish Events (collected from Very Ancient Documents faithfully compared with each other & supported by the Genealogical & Chronological Aid of the Sacred and Profane Writings of the Globe”.

== Namesake ==
Ogygia Island in Antarctica is named after the mythical island.
