= Monroe Point =

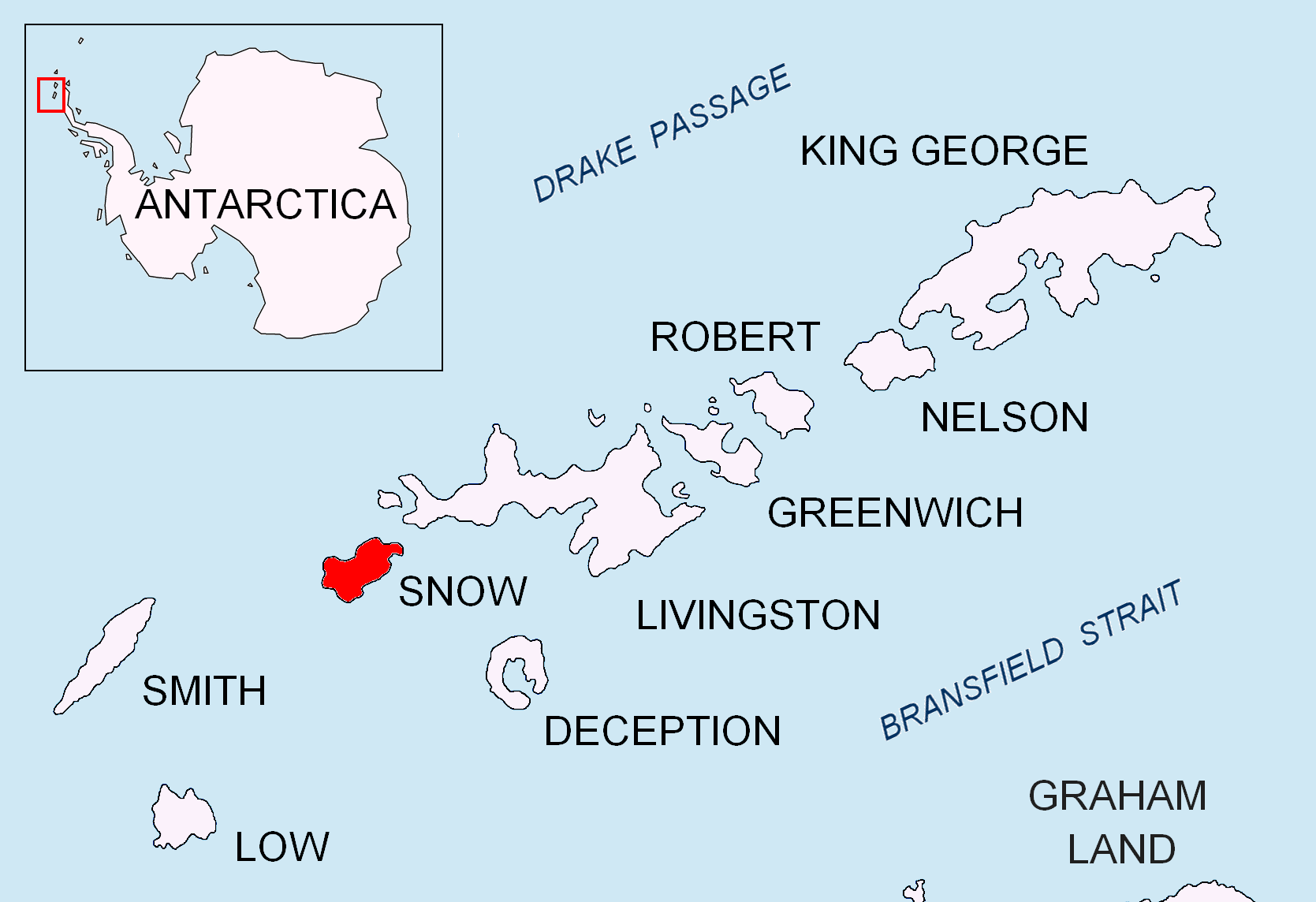
Location of Snow Island in the South Shetland Islands.

Topographic map of Livingston Island, Greenwich, Robert, Snow and Smith Islands.

Monroe Point is an ice-free tipped point projecting 1.1 km into Boyd Strait from the west coast of Snow Island in the South Shetland Islands, Antarctica, and forming the south side of the entrance to Barutin Cove.

The feature's name derives from the name 'Monroe Island' applied to Snow Island by 19th century sealers.

== Location ==
The point is located at 62°48′40″S 61°30′55″W which is 4.1 km south by east of Esteverena Point, 5.58 km northwest of Cape Conway and 40.54 km east-northeast of Cape Smith, Smith Island (British mapping in 1935 and 1968, and Bulgarian in 2009).

== Map ==
- L.L. Ivanov. Antarctica: Livingston Island and Greenwich, Robert, Snow and Smith Islands. Scale 1:120000 topographic map. Troyan: Manfred Wörner Foundation, 2009. ISBN 978-954-92032-6-4
