= Calypso (mythology) =

Nymph in Homer's Odyssey

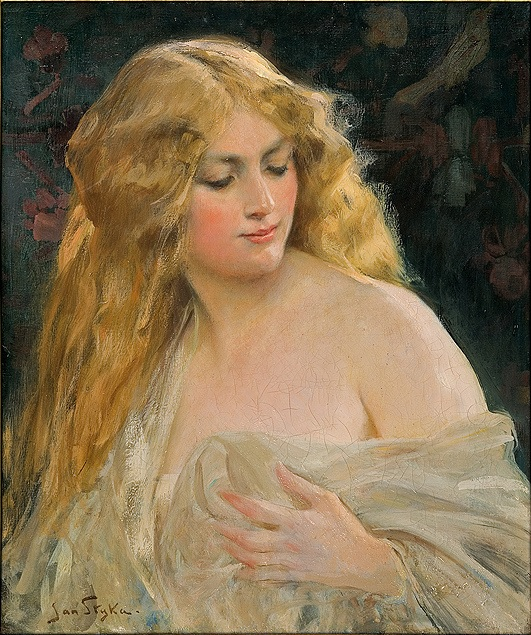
- Calypso, blonde-haired goddess by Jan Styka (20th century)
- Abode: Ogygia

Genealogy
- Parents: Atlas
- Consort: Odysseus, Hermes
- Children: Latinus, Nausithous, Nausinous, the Cephalonians

In Greek mythology, Calypso (/kəˈlɪpsoʊ/; Ancient Greek: Καλυψώ, romanized: Kalypsṓ, lit. 'she who conceals') was a nymph who lived on the island of Ogygia, where, according to Homer's Odyssey, she detained Odysseus for seven years against his will. She promised Odysseus immortality if he would stay with her, but Odysseus preferred to return home. Eventually, after the intervention of the other gods, Calypso was forced to let Odysseus go.

== Etymology ==
The name Calypso derives from the Greek καλύπτω (kalyptō), meaning 'to cover', 'to conceal', or 'to hide'; as such, her name translates to 'she who conceals'.

According to the medieval dictionary Etymologicum Magnum, her name means 'concealing the knowledge' (from Greek: καλύπτουσα το διανοούμενον, romanized: kalýptousa to dianooúmenon).

== Family ==
Calypso is generally said to be the daughter of the Titan Atlas. In the Fabulae, she is born to Pleione, the mother of the Pleiades, though this is the only source in which this parentage appears.

Hesiod and the anonymous author of the Homeric Hymn to Demeter mention either a different Calypso or possibly the same Calypso as one of the Oceanid nymphs, daughters of Tethys and Oceanus. Apollodorus includes the name Calypso in his list of Nereids, the daughters of Nereus and Doris. John Tzetzes meanwhile makes her a daughter of the sun-god Helios and the Oceanid nymph Perse, who are also the parents of Circe; perhaps due to her association with Circe and their behaviour and connection to Odysseus, the two goddesses were sometimes confused.

According to a fragment from the Catalogue of Women, Calypso bore the Cephalonians to Hermes, as suggested by Hermes's visits to her island in the Odyssey.

== Mythology ==
=== The Odyssey ===
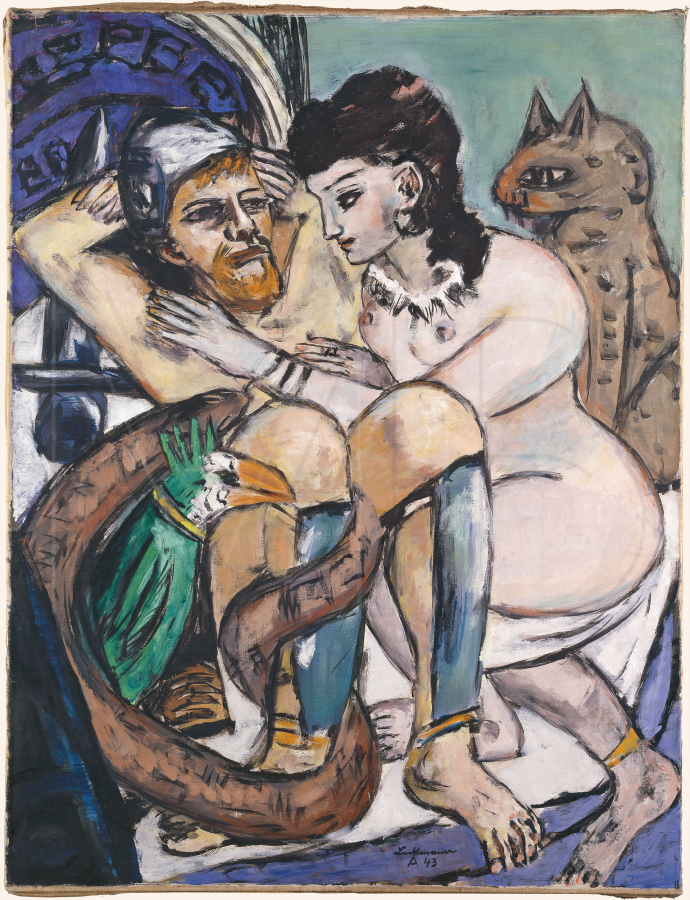
Odysseus and Calypso, painted by Max Beckmann, 1943

In Homer's Odyssey, Calypso attempts to keep the fabled Greek hero Odysseus on her island to make him her immortal husband, while he also gets to enjoy her sensual pleasures forever. According to Homer, Calypso kept Odysseus prisoner by force at Ogygia for seven years. Calypso enchants Odysseus with her singing as she moves to and fro, weaving on her loom with a golden shuttle.

Odysseus comes to wish for circumstances to change. He can no longer bear being separated from his wife, Penelope, and wants to tell Calypso. He spends the daytime sitting on a headland or at the sea-shore crying, while at night he is forced to sleep with her in the cave against his will. His patron goddess Athena asks Zeus to order the release of Odysseus from the island; Zeus orders the messenger Hermes to tell Calypso to set Odysseus free, for it was not Odysseus's destiny to live with her forever. She angrily comments on how the gods hate goddesses having affairs with mortals.

Calypso provides Odysseus with an axe, drill, and adze to build a boat. Calypso leads Odysseus to an island where he can chop down trees and make planks for his boat. Calypso also provides him with wine, bread, clothing, and more materials for his boat. The goddess then sets wind at his back when he sets sail. After seven years, Odysseus has built his boat and leaves Calypso.

=== Other narratives ===
Homer does not mention any children by Calypso. By some accounts that came after the Odyssey, Calypso bore Odysseus a son, Latinus, though Circe is usually given as Latinus's mother. In other accounts, Calypso bore Odysseus two children, Nausithous and Nausinous.

The story of Odysseus and Calypso has some close resemblances to the interactions between Gilgamesh and Siduri in the Epic of Gilgamesh in that "the lone female plies the inconsolable hero-wanderer with drink and sends him off to a place beyond the sea reserved for a special class of honoured people" and "to prepare for the voyage he has to cut down and trim timbers".

A fragment from the Catalogue of Women, erroneously attributed to Hesiod, claimed that Calypso detained Odysseus for years as a favour to Poseidon, the sea-god who detested Odysseus for blinding his son, the cyclops Polyphemus.

According to Hyginus, Calypso killed herself because of her love for Odysseus.

== In literature ==
In her poem Calypso Watching the Ocean, Letitia Landon describes her as eternally yearning for Odysseus' return and comments on the folly of such obsession.

In Arthur Quiller-Couch's comic novel, "The astonishing History of Troy Town", Calypso is the younger of Admiral Buzza's daughters, named after his ship.

Philosophers have written about the meaning of Calypso in the world of ancient Greece. Ryan Patrick Hanley commented on the interpretation of Calypso in Les Aventures de Télémaque written by Fénelon. Hanley says that the story of Calypso illustrates the link between Eros and pride. Theodor Adorno and Max Horkheimer brought attention to the combination of power over fate and the sensibility of "bourgeois housewives" in the depiction of Calypso.

== In film and other media ==
Calypso in the 1905 film L'Île de Calypso

Calypso in the 1911 film L'Odissea

Kyra Bester as Calypso in the 1968 miniseries Odissea (dal Poema di Omero)

- Calypso appears in the 1905 film L'Île de Calypso.
- Calypso appears in the 1911 film L'Odissea.
- Kyra Bester portrayed Calypso in the 1968 miniseries Odissea (dal Poema di Omero).
- Branca De Camargo portrayed an unnamed woman whom the director later identified as Calypso in the 1989 film Nostos: The Return.
- Vanessa Williams portrayed Calypso in the 1997 miniseries The Odyssey.
- Naomie Harris portrayed Tia Dalma, who is later revealed to be Calypso, in the Pirates of the Caribbean movie franchise.
- Charlize Theron portrayed Calypso in the 2026 film The Odyssey.

== Gallery ==
Calypso in Art

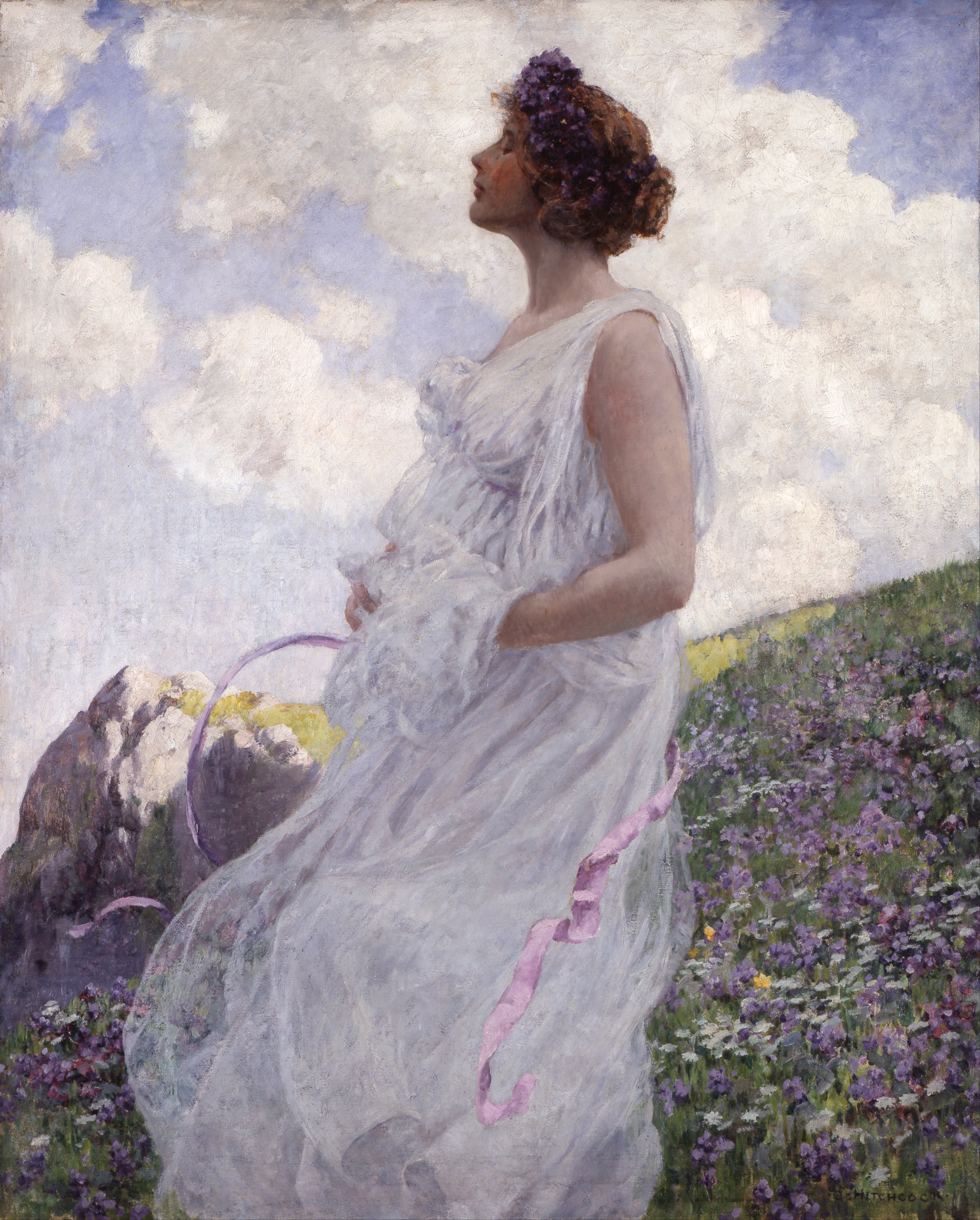
Calypso by George Hitchcock (about 1906)

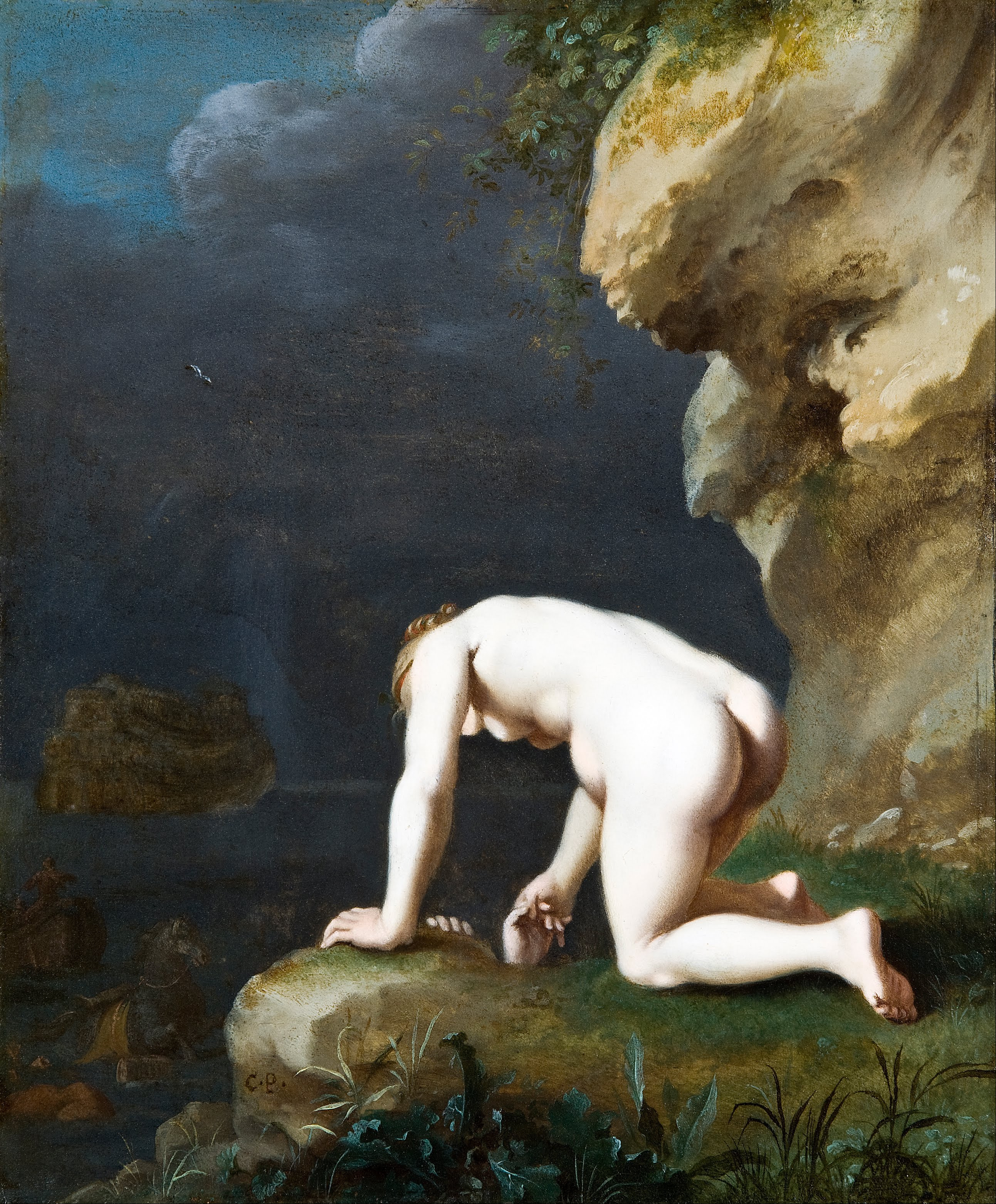
The Goddess Calypso rescues Ulysses Cornelius van Poelenburgh (1630)

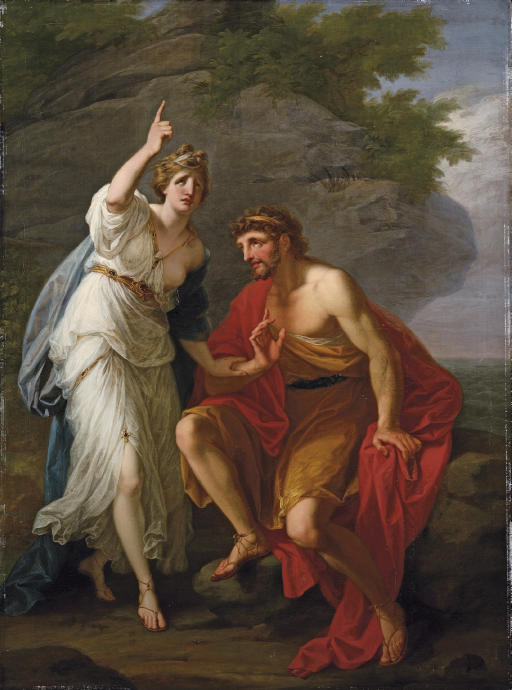
Calypso calling heaven and earth to witness her sincere affection to Ulysses by Angelica Kauffman (18th-century)

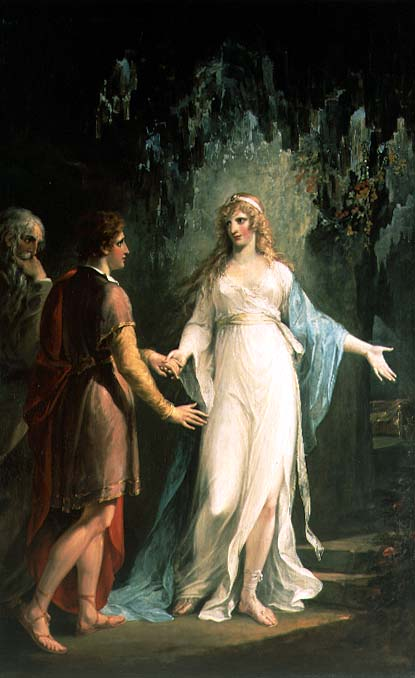
Calypso receiving Telemachus and Mentor in the Grotto by William Hamilton (18th century)

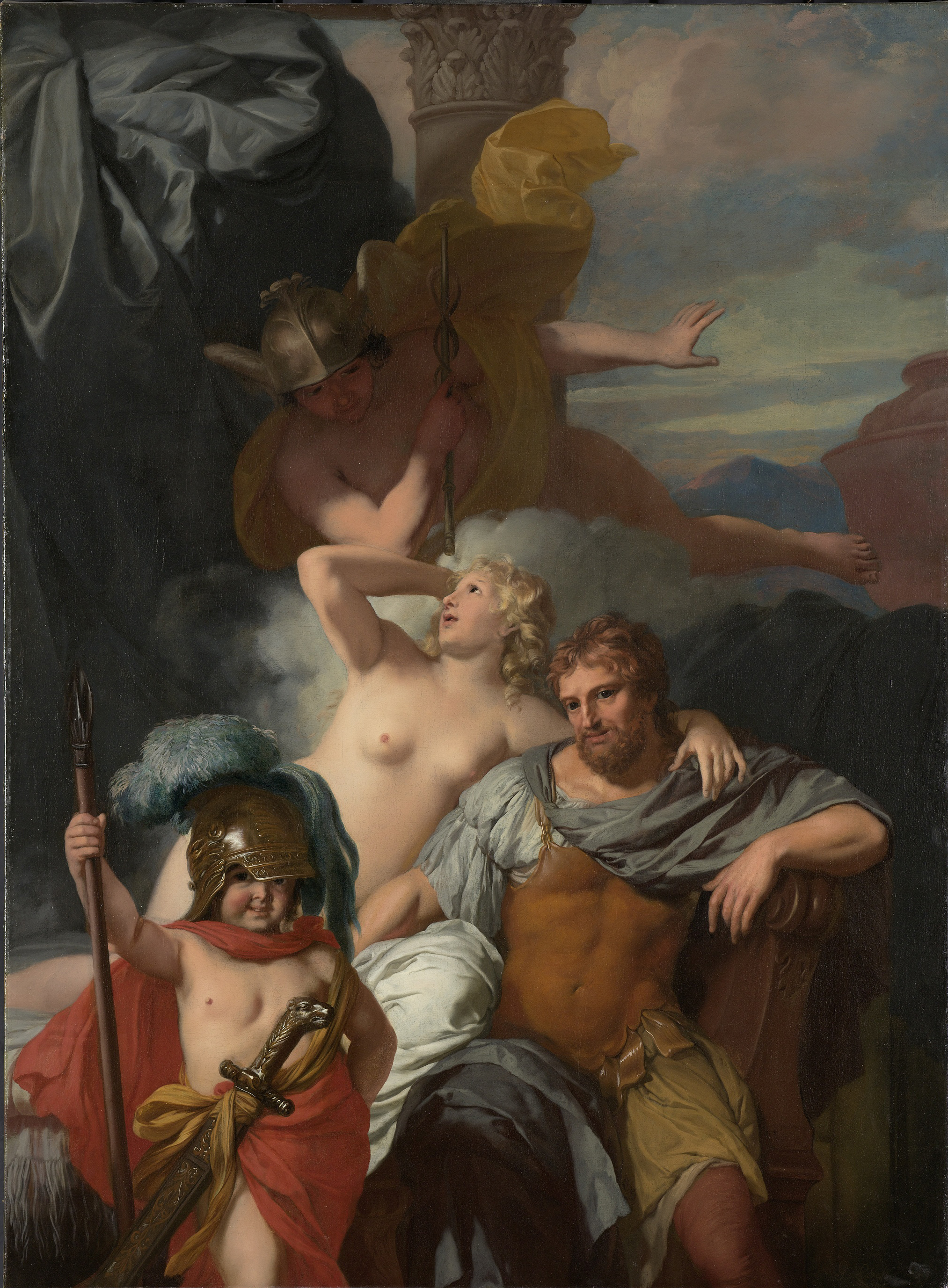
Mercury ordering Calypso to release Odysseus by Gerard de Lairesse (1676–1682)

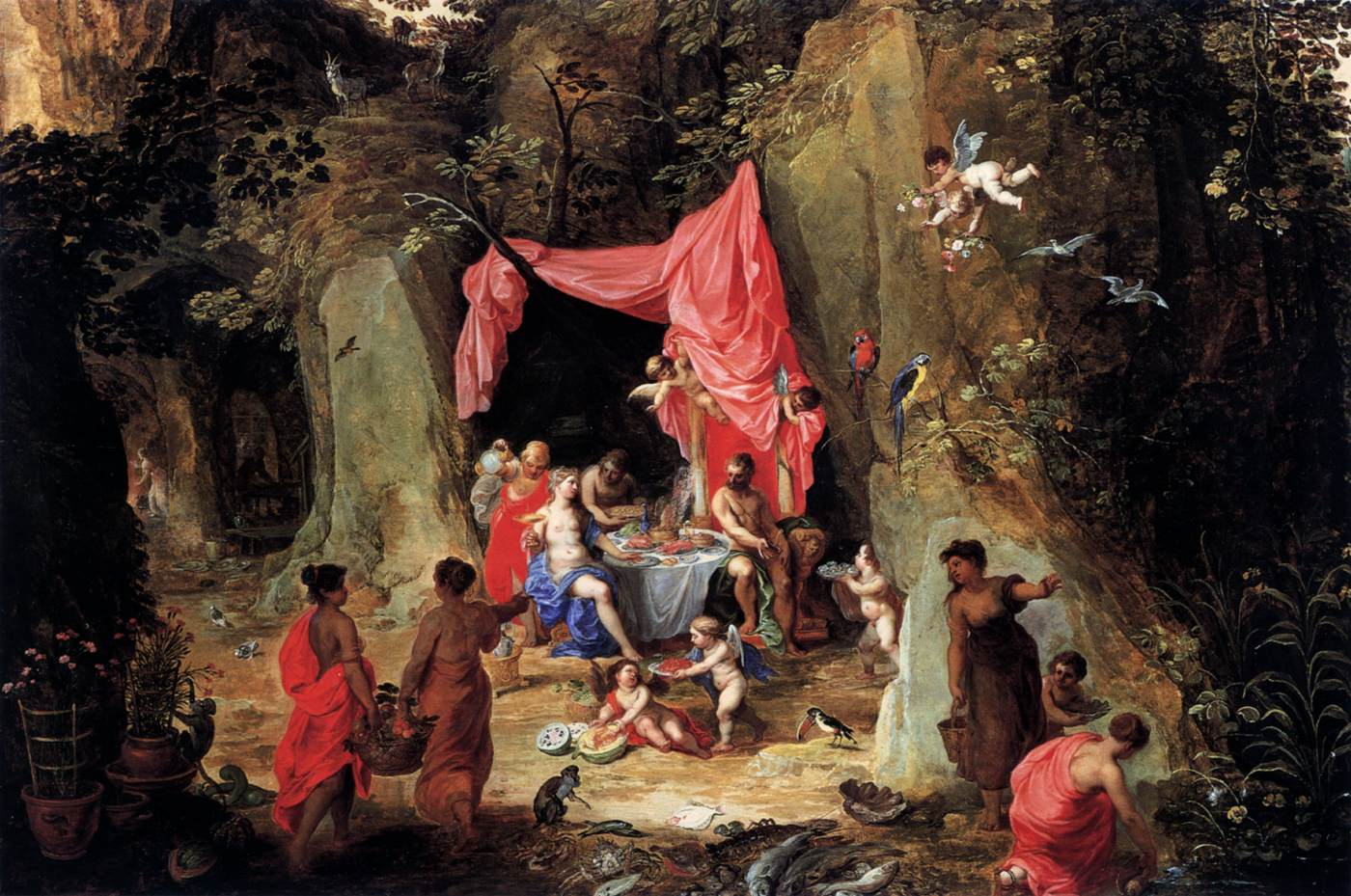
Odysseus as guest at the nymph Calypso by Hendrick van Balen (circa 1616)

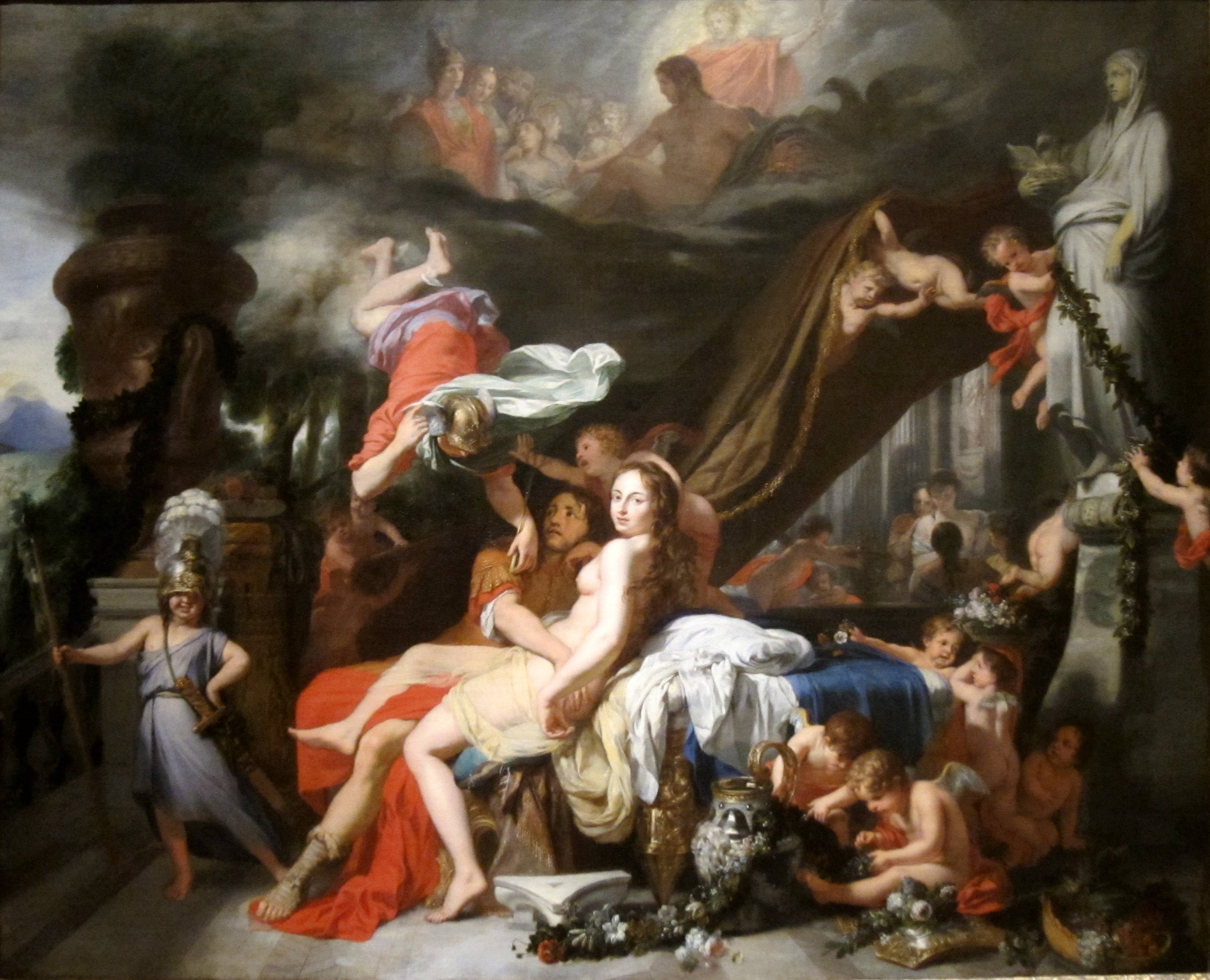
Hermes Ordering Calypso to Release Odysseus by Gerard de Lairesse (circa 1670)

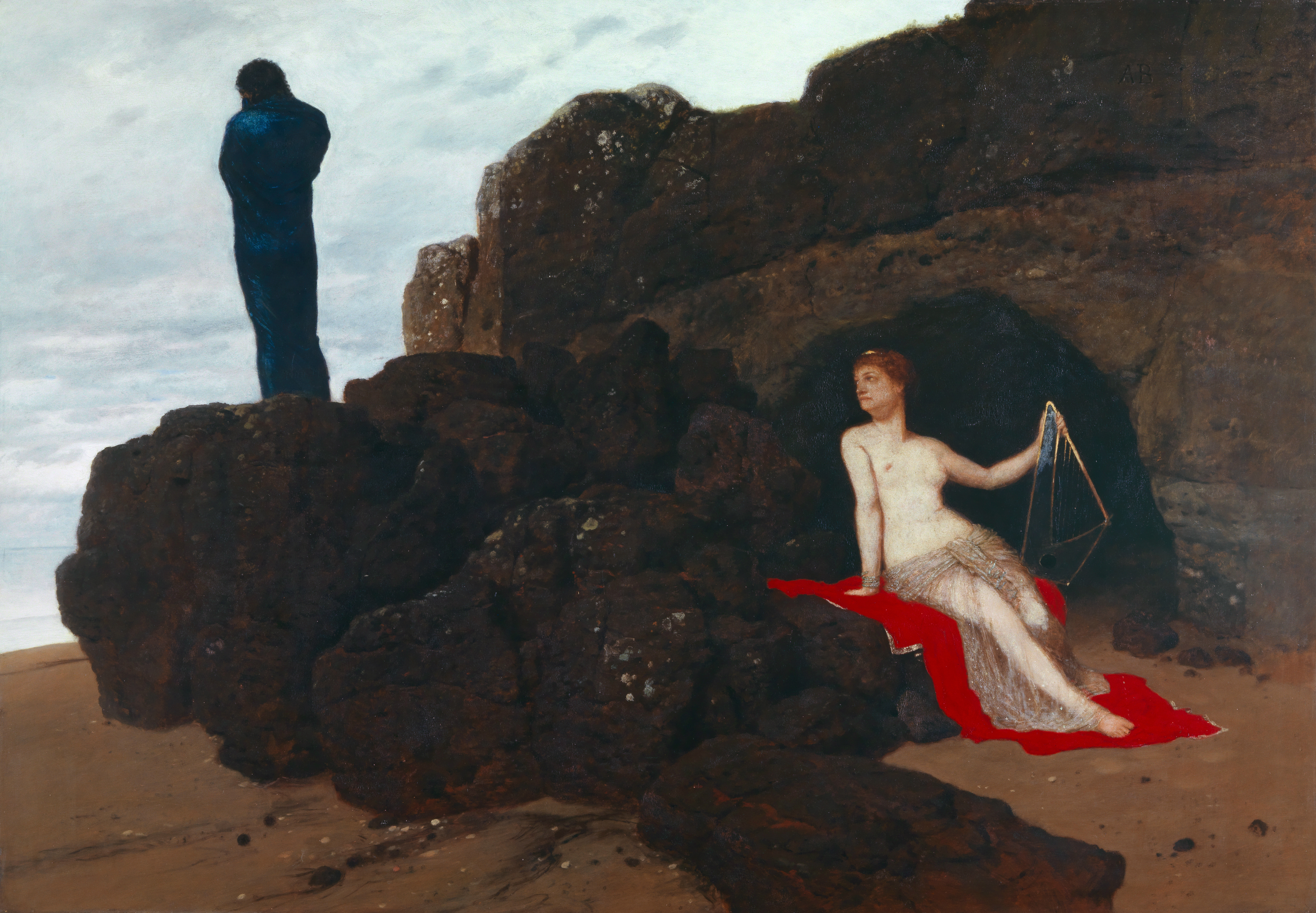
Odysseus und Kalypso by Arnold Böcklin (1883)

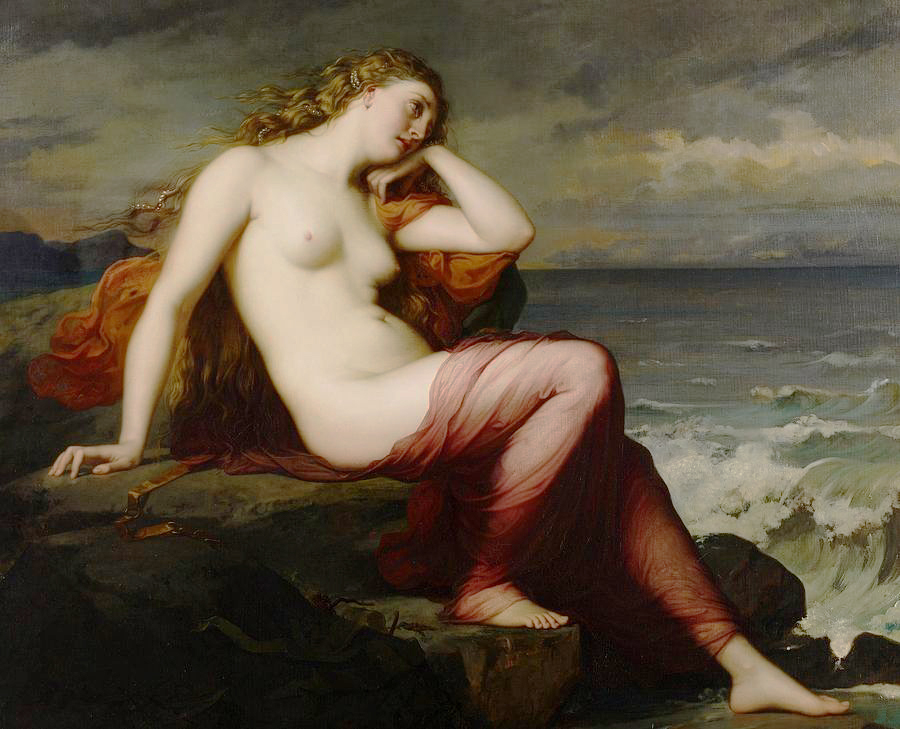
Calypso by Henri Lehmann (1869)

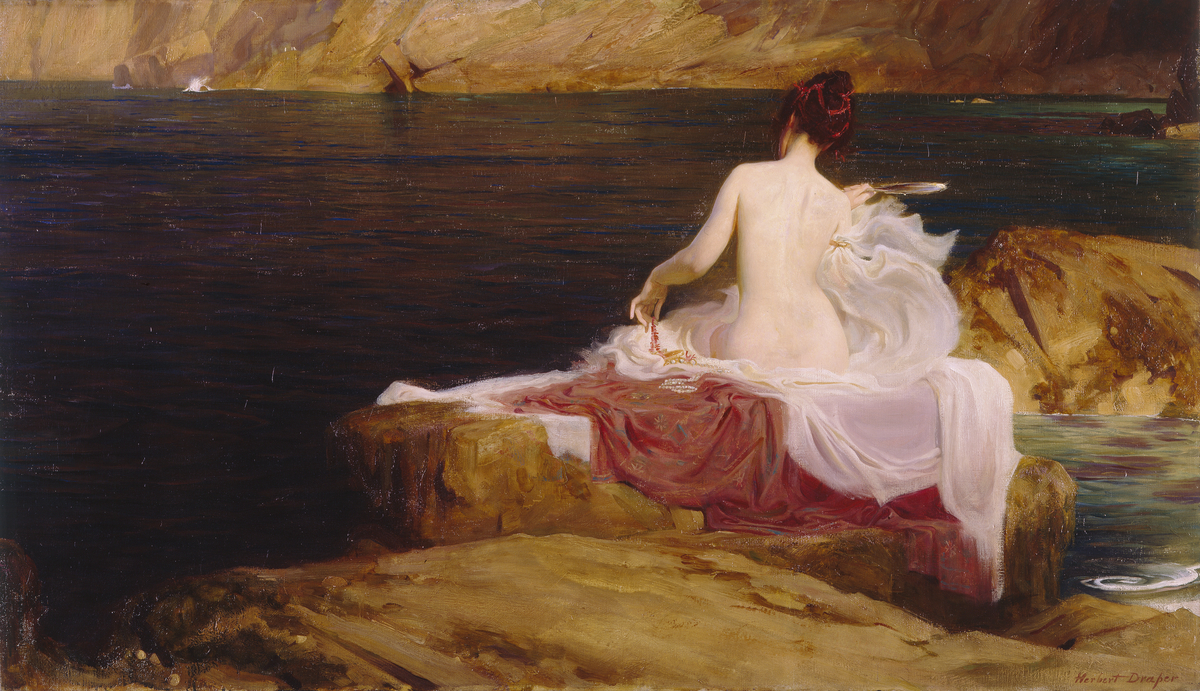
Calypso's Isle by Herbert James Draper (1897)

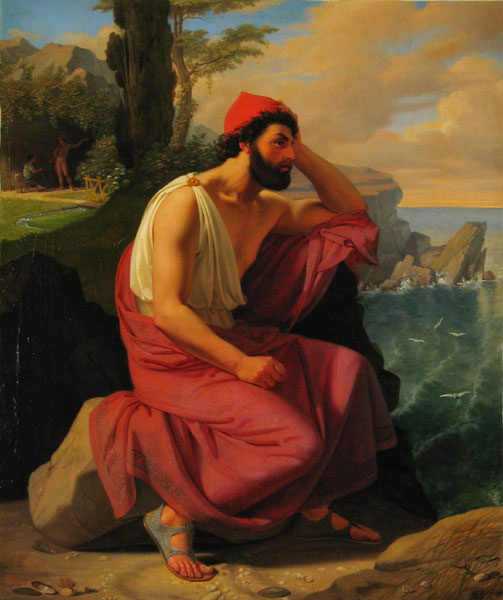
Ulysses on Calypso's island by Ditlev Blunck (1830)

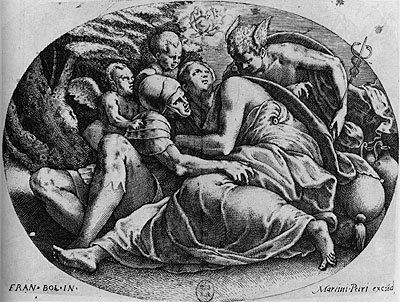
Hermes bei Calypso und Odysseus by Hubert Maurer

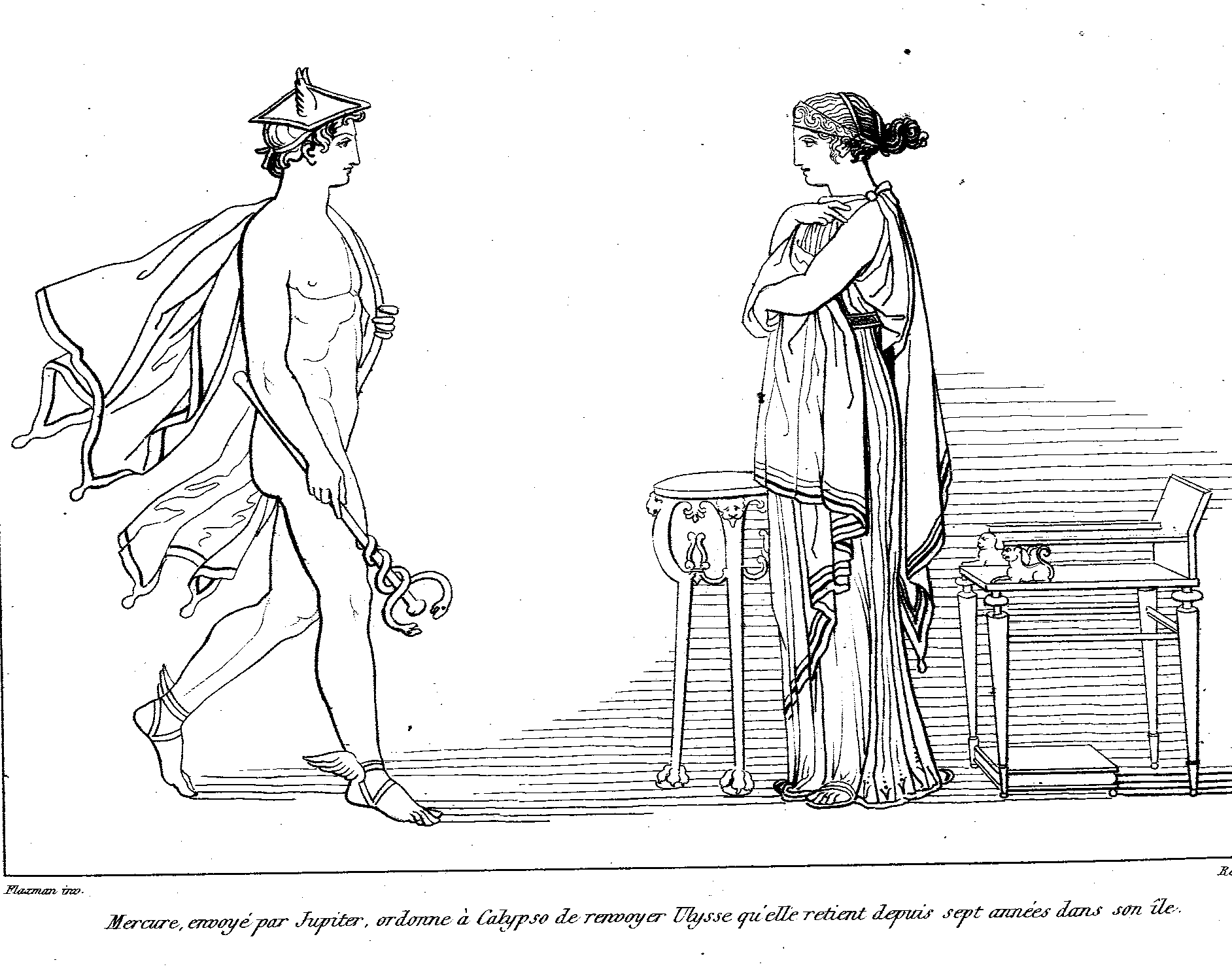
Hermes orders Calypso to release Odysseus by John Flaxman (1810)

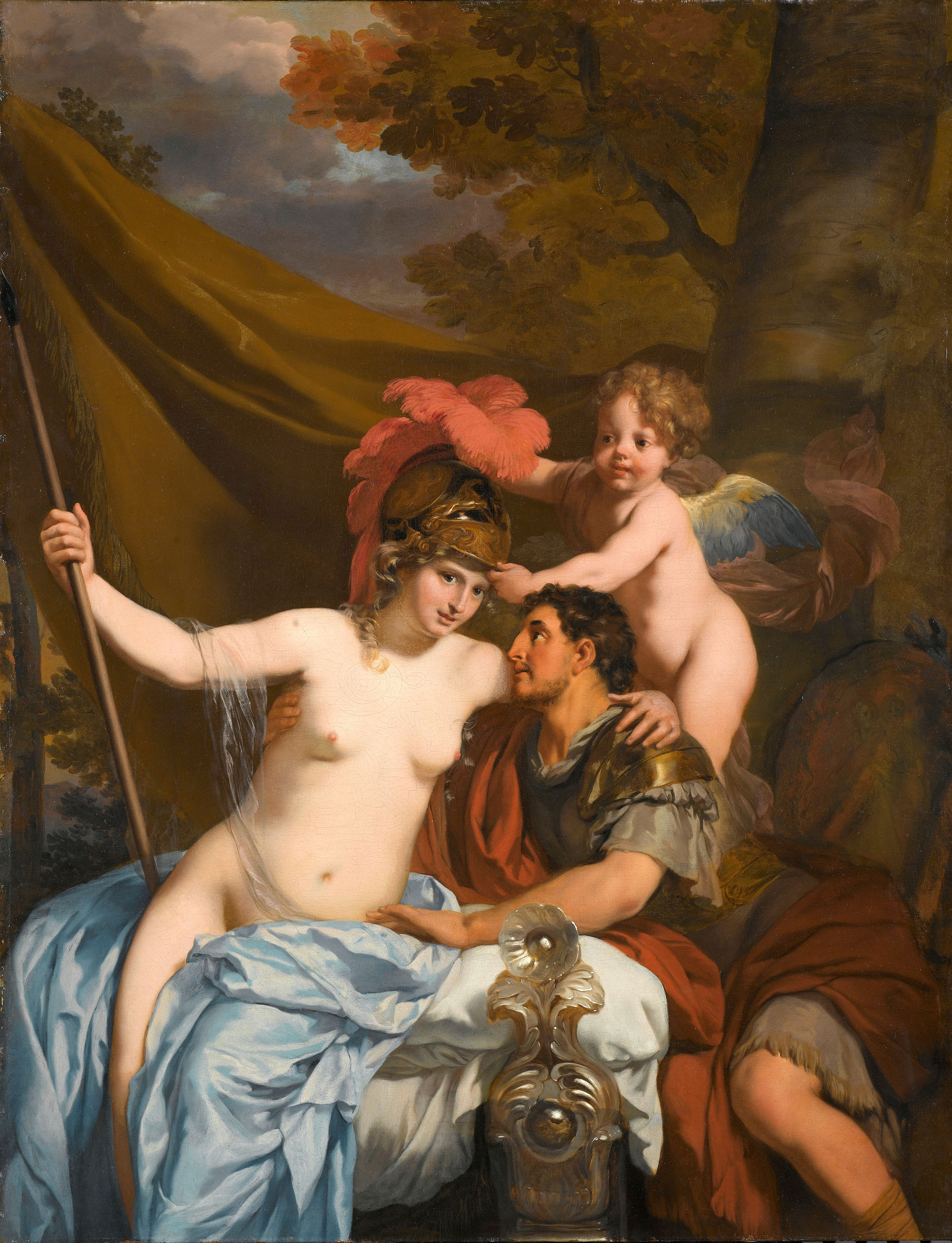
Odysseus bij Calypso (Rijksmuseum) Gérard (de) Lairesse

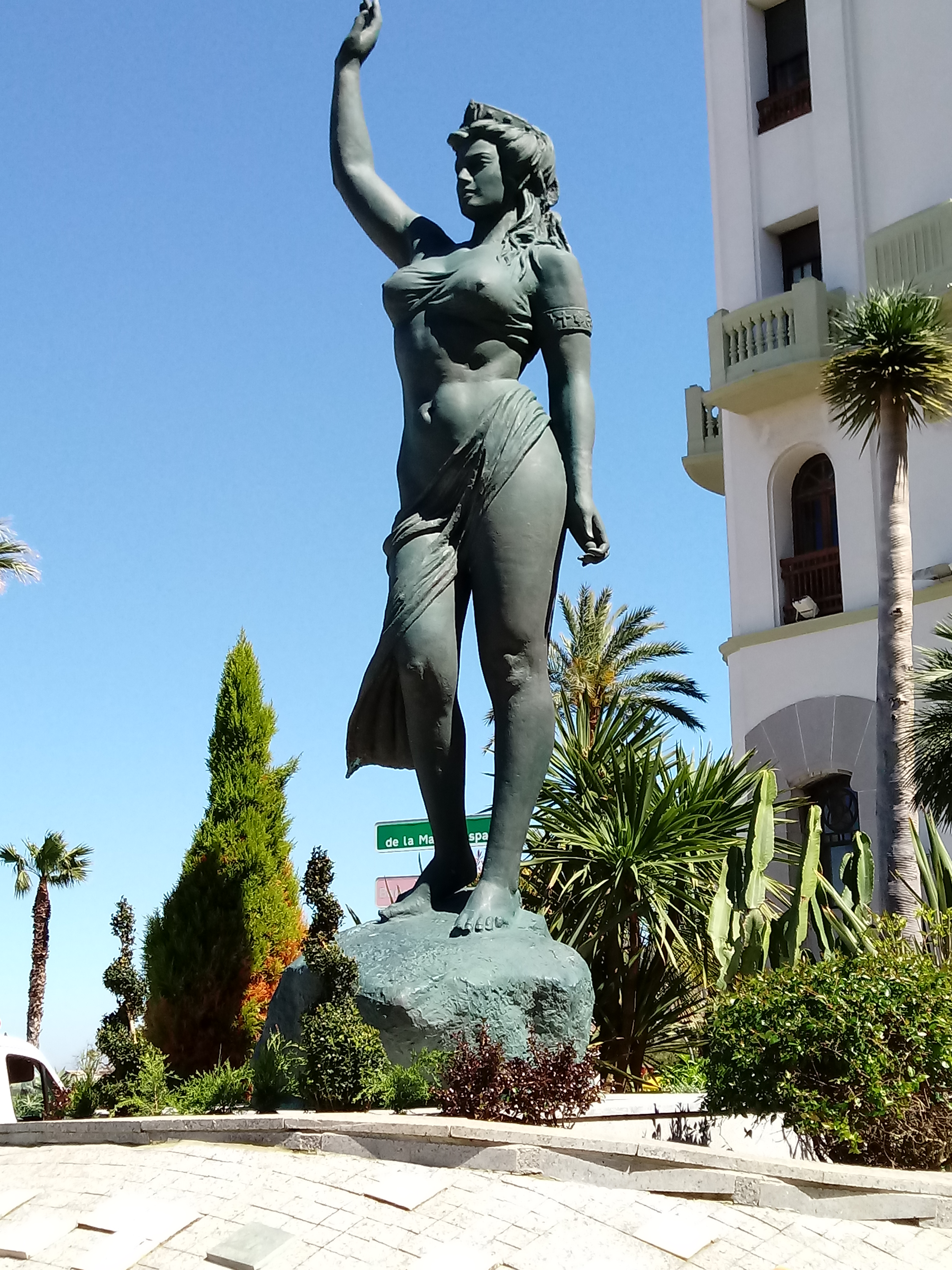
Statue in Ceuta (Ginés Serrán-Pagán) of Calypso bidding farewell to Odysseus
