= Cape Conway =

Cape in the South Shetland Islands, Antarctica

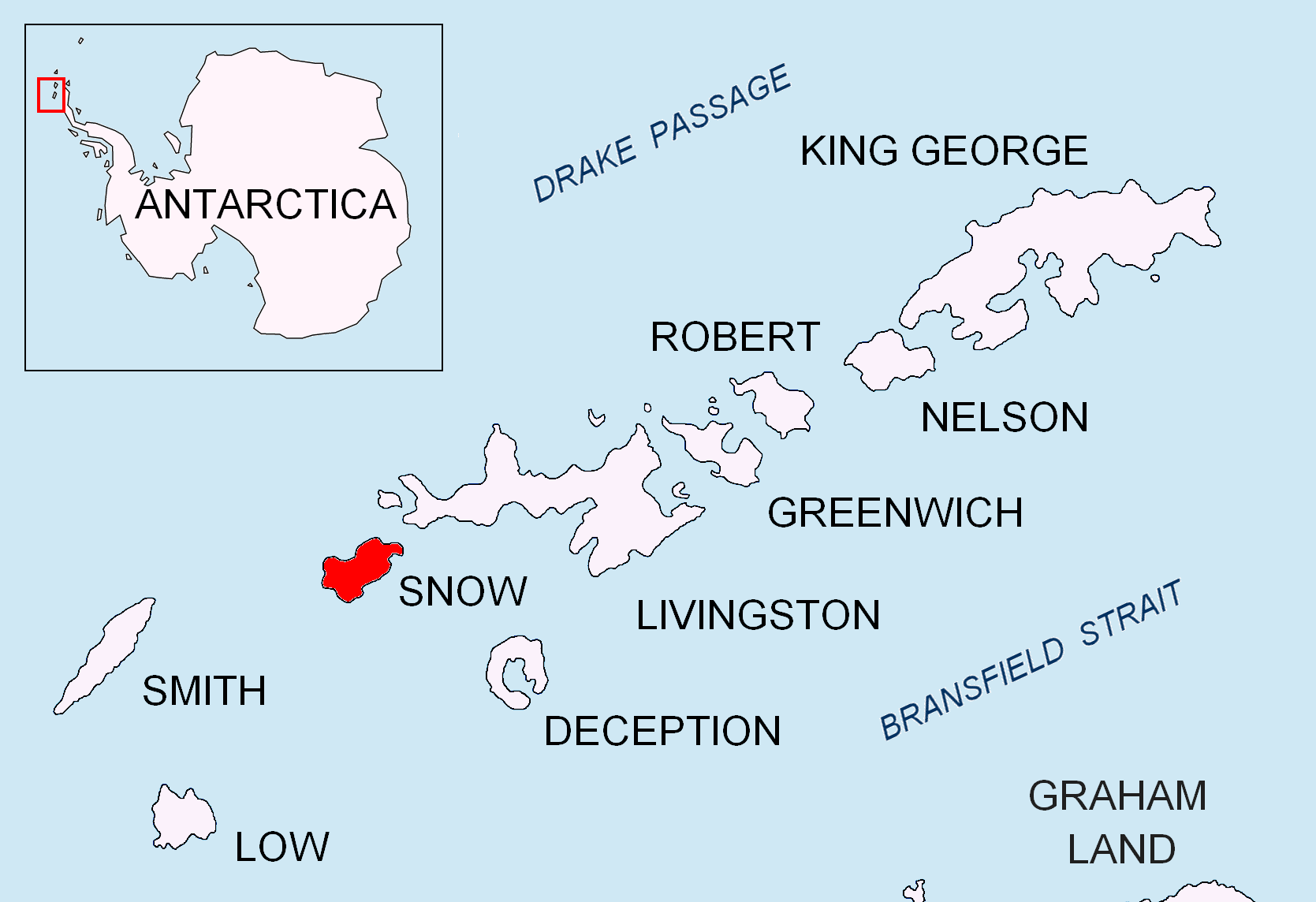
- Location of Cape Conway

- Location within Antarctic Peninsula Location within Antarctica

Geography
- Location: Antarctica
- Coordinates: 62°50′30″S 61°25′43″W
- Archipelago: South Shetland Islands

Administration
- Antarctica
- Administered under the Antarctic Treaty System

Demographics
- Population: uninhabited

Cape Conway is the rounded low and ice-free tipped cape forming the south extremity of Snow Island in the South Shetland Islands, Antarctica. It is a south entrance point for Boyd Strait. Tooth Rock (62°51′32.4″S 61°25′33.9″W) rising to 85 m (279 ft) and lying 1.94 km (1.21 mi) to the south is the largest in a group of rocks extending 2.7 km (1.7 mi) from the cape. The area was visited by 19th century sealers.

Cape Conway was charted in 1829 by the British naval expedition under Captain Henry Foster and named after HMS Conway in which Foster had previously served. Tooth Rock was descriptively named following a survey from RRS John Biscoe in 1951–52.

== Location ==
The cape is located at 62°50′30″S 61°25′43″W which is 10.58 km (6.57 mi) south-southeast of Byewater Point, 17.3 km (10.7 mi) southwest of President Head, 11.75 km (7.30 mi) southwest of Hall Peninsula and 44.46 km (27.63 mi) east by north of Cape Smith, Smith Island (British mapping in 1821–22, 1935, 1951-51 and 1968, Argentine in 1946, Chilean in 1974, and Bulgarian in 2009).

Topographic map of Livingston Island, Greenwich, Robert, Snow and Smith Islands.

== See also ==
- Composite Antarctic Gazetteer
- List of Antarctic islands south of 60° S
- SCAR
- Territorial claims in Antarctica

== Maps ==
- L.L. Ivanov. Antarctica: Livingston Island and Greenwich, Robert, Snow and Smith Islands. Scale 1:120000 topographic map. Troyan: Manfred Wörner Foundation, 2009. ISBN 978-954-92032-6-4
