= Boyd Strait =

Strait in Shetland Islands, Antarctica

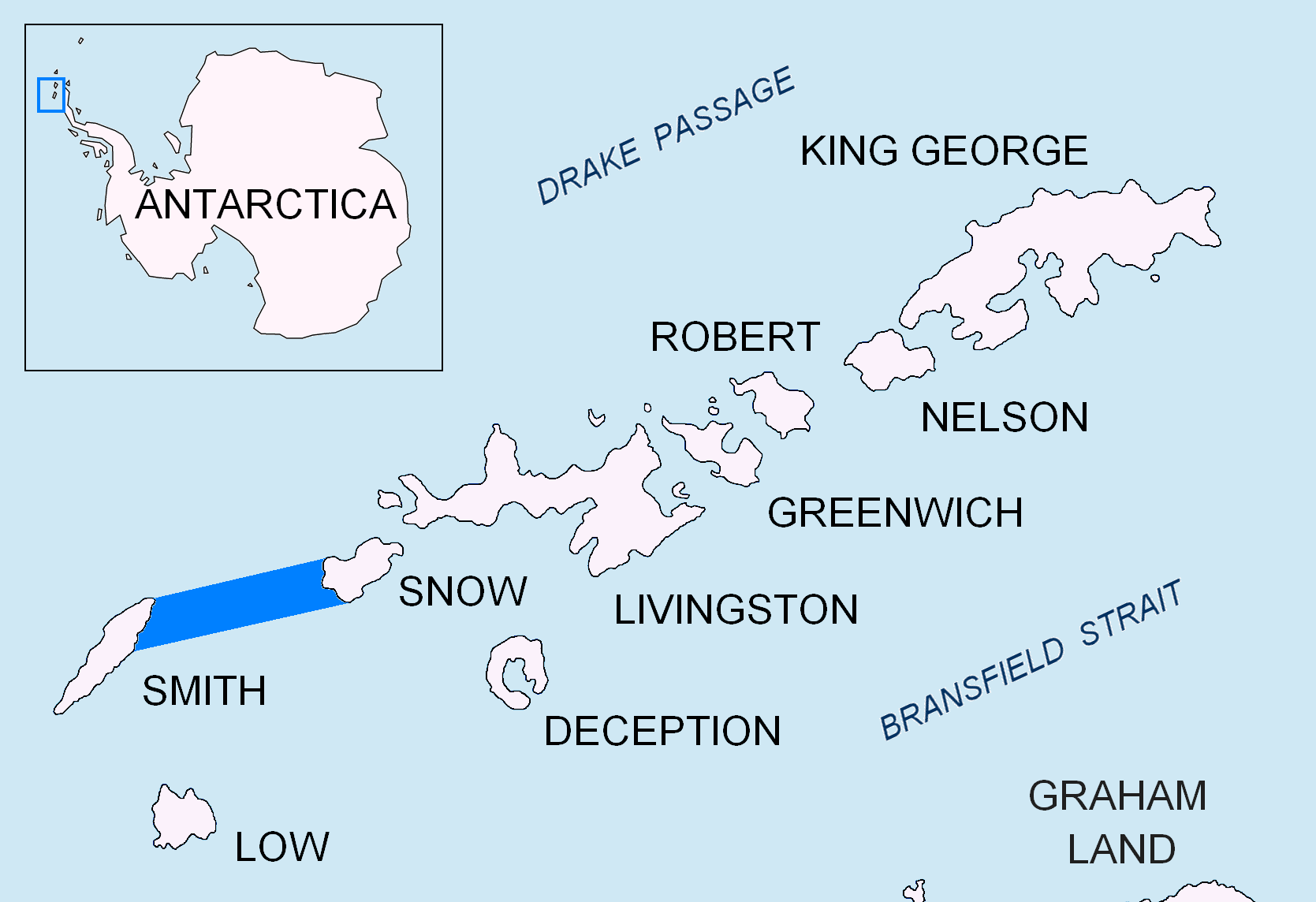
Location of Boyd Strait in the South Shetland Islands.

Topographic map of Livingston Island, Greenwich, Robert, Snow and Smith Islands.

Boyd Strait is the 40-kilometre (25 mi) wide strait lying between Snow Island and Smith Island in the South Shetland Islands, Antarctica, and linking Drake Passage and the Bransfield Strait.

The strait was named in 1823 by a British expedition under James Weddell for Captain David Boyd, Royal Navy.

== Location ==
Boyd Strait is located at 62°50′S 62°00′W. British mapping in 1823 and 1930-1931.

== Maps ==
- Chart of South Shetland including Coronation Island, &c. from the exploration of the sloop Dove in the years 1821 and 1822 by George Powell Commander of the same. Scale ca. 1:200000. London: Laurie, 1822.
- South Shetland Islands : Map 3. Scale 1:200000. Cambridge: British Antarctic Survey, 2008.
