= Linus Beach =

Beach in the Antarctica

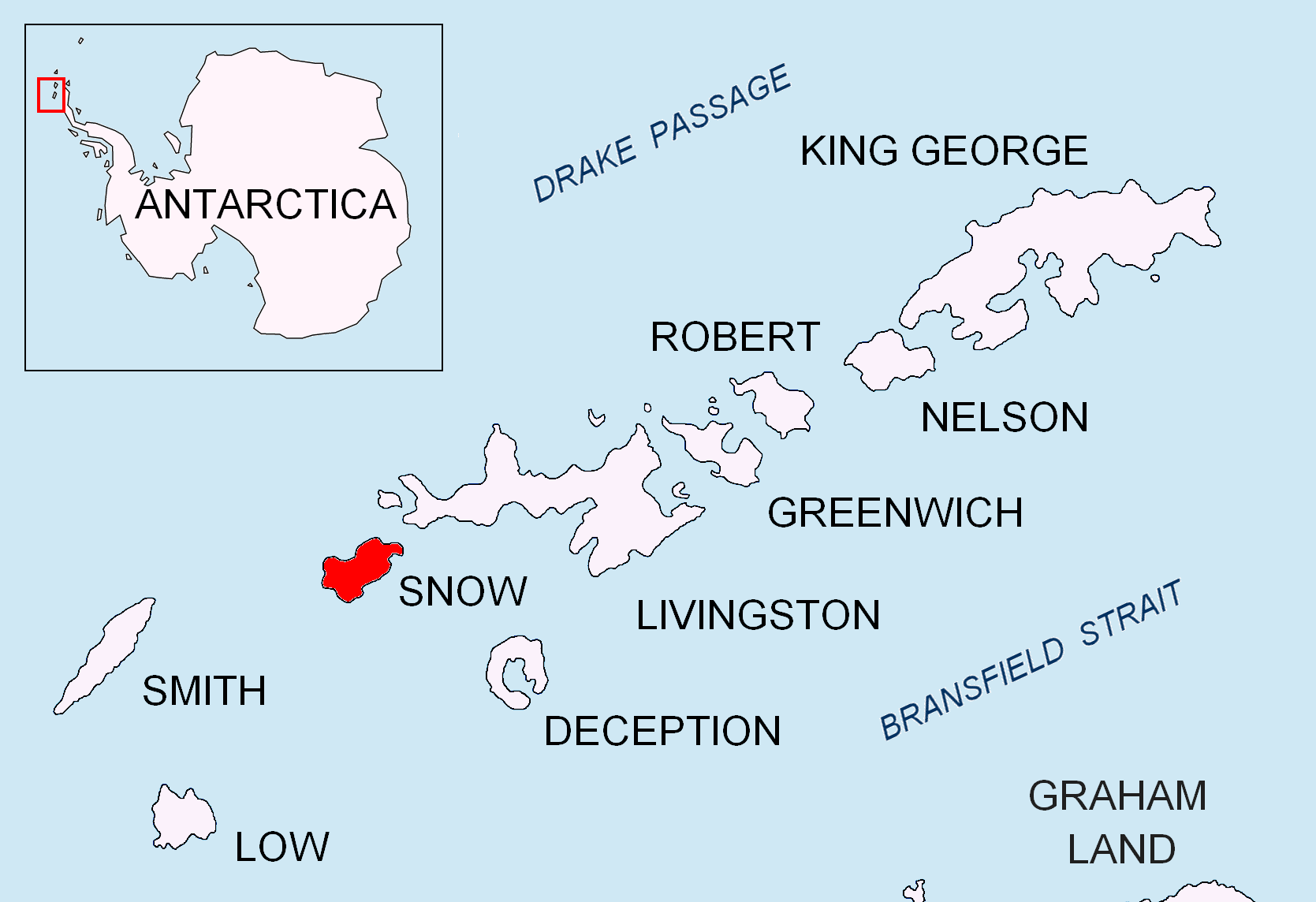
Location of Snow Island in the South Shetland Islands

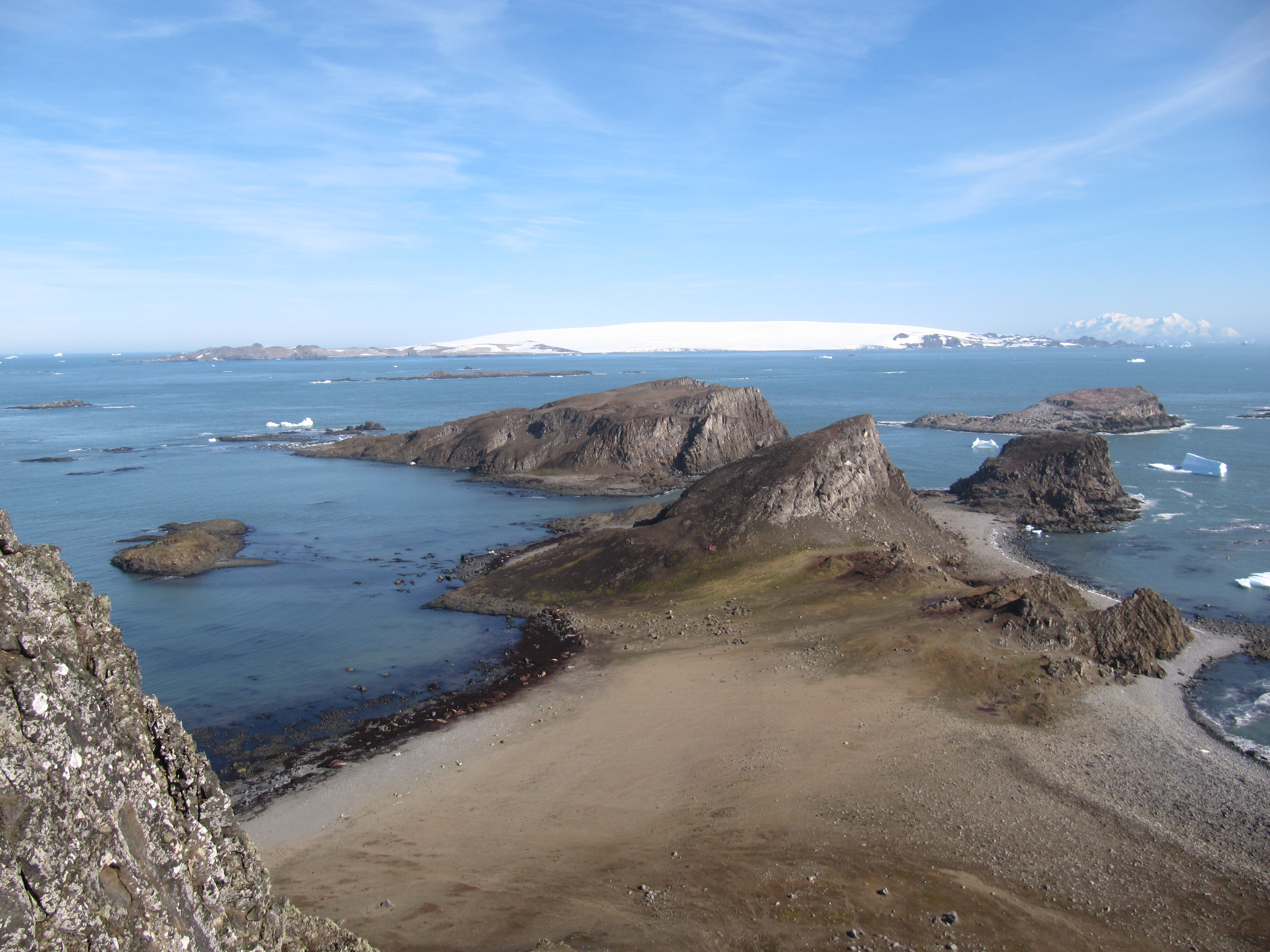
Morton Strait from Livingston Island, with Snow Island in the background featuring Calliope Beach on the left and Linus Beach on the right

Topographic map of Livingston, Greenwich, Robert, Snow and Smith Islands

Linus Beach (Bulgarian: бряг Лин, romanized: bryag Lin, IPA: [ˈbrʲak ˈlin]) is the ice-free 2 km long beach on the east side of Cape Timblón, Snow Island in the South Shetland Islands, Antarctica. It is part of the south coast of Morton Strait. The area was visited by early 19th century sealers.

The feature is named after the mythical musician and poet Linus of Thrace, brother of Orpheus.

== Location ==
Linus Beach is centred at 62°42′45″S 61°19′10″W, which is 1.5 km west of Gostun Point and 1.6 km east of Mezdra Point. Bulgarian mapping in 2009 and 2017.

== Maps ==
- L. Ivanov. Antarctica: Livingston Island and Greenwich, Robert, Snow and Smith Islands. Scale 1:120000 topographic map. Troyan: Manfred Wörner Foundation, 2010. ISBN 978-954-92032-9-5 (First edition 2009. ISBN 978-954-92032-6-4)
- L. Ivanov. Antarctica: Livingston Island and Smith Island. Scale 1:100000 topographic map. Manfred Wörner Foundation, 2017. ISBN 978-619-90008-3-0
- Antarctic Digital Database (ADD). Scale 1:250000 topographic map of Antarctica. Scientific Committee on Antarctic Research (SCAR). Since 1993, regularly upgraded and updated
