= Gergini Reef =

Rocky low-tide elevation in Antarctica

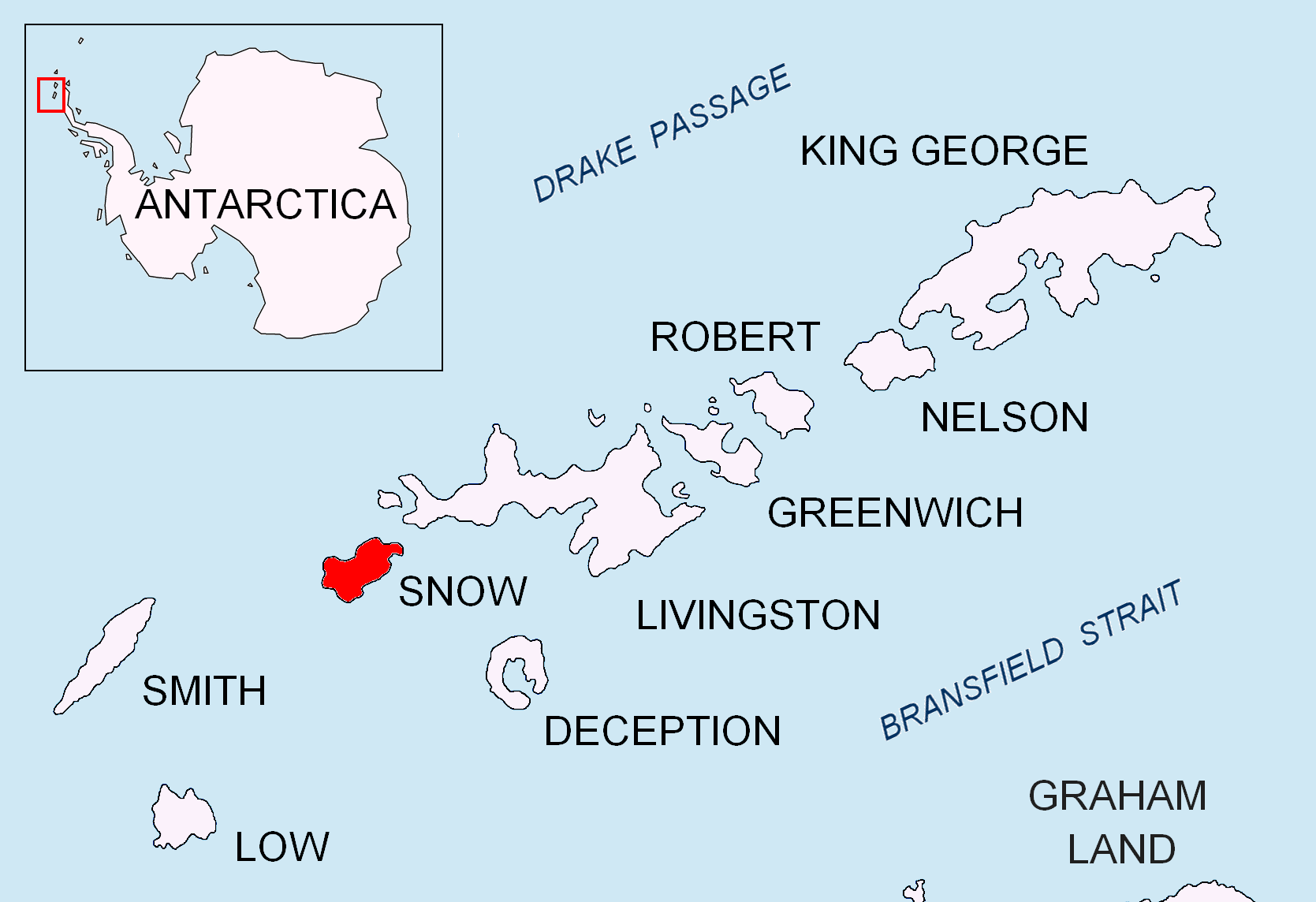
Location of Snow Island in the South Shetland Islands

Topographic map of Livingston Island, Greenwich, Robert, Snow and Smith Islands

Gergini Reef (Bulgarian: риф Гергини, ‘Rif Gergini’ \'rif ger-'gi-ni\) is the triangular flat and rocky low-tide elevation off the northwest coast of Snow Island in the South Shetland Islands, Antarctica. It extends 400 m in east–west direction and is 210 m wide. The feature is named after the settlement of Gergini in Northern Bulgaria.

== Location ==
Gergini Reef is centred at 62°44′58″S 61°30′55″W, which is 450 m northwest of Byewater Point, 3.74 km southwest of Bizone Rock and 760 m WSW of Korsis Island. Bulgarian mapping in 2009.

== Maps ==
- L.L. Ivanov. Antarctica: Livingston Island and Greenwich, Robert, Snow and Smith Islands. Scale 1:120000 topographic map. Troyan: Manfred Wörner Foundation, 2009.
- Antarctic Digital Database (ADD). Scale 1:250000 topographic map of Antarctica. Scientific Committee on Antarctic Research (SCAR). Since 1993, regularly upgraded and updated
