= Korsis Island =

Antarctic island

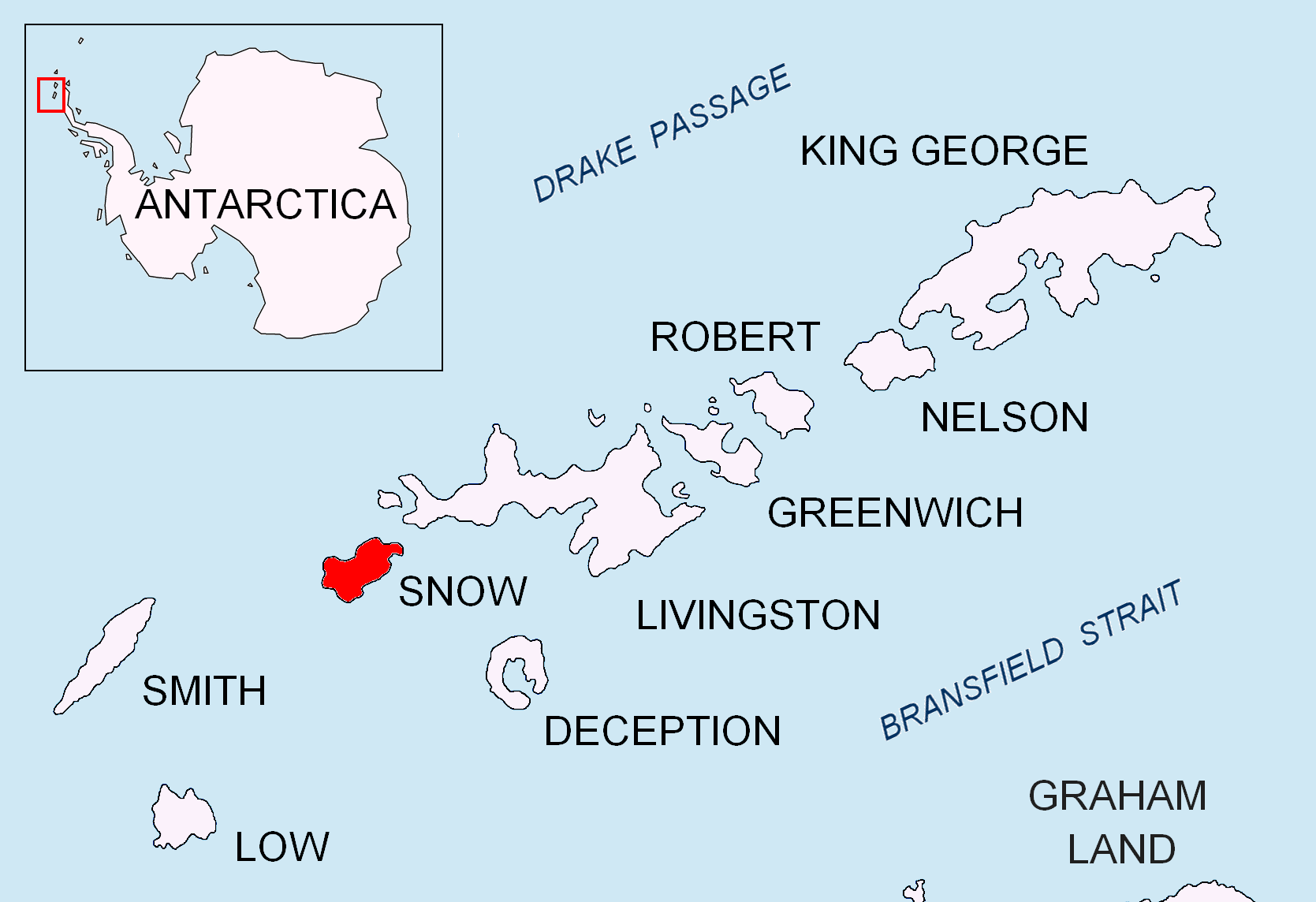
Location of Snow Island in the South Shetland Islands

Topographic map of Livingston Island, Greenwich, Robert, Snow and Smith Islands

Korsis Island (Bulgarian: остров Корсис, romanized: ostrov Korsis, IPA: [ˈɔstrof ˈkɔrsis]) is the rocky island lying 150 m off the northwest coast of Snow Island in the South Shetland Islands, Antarctica. It extends 300 m in southeast-northwest direction and 180 m wide. The feature is named after the Bulgarian military commander Korsis, 9th century.

== Location ==
Korsis Island is located at 62°44′49.5″S 61°29′44″W, which is 1750 m northeast of Byewater Point, 760 m east-northeast of Gergini Reef and 2.93 km southwest of Bizone Rock. Bulgarian mapping in 2009.

== Maps ==
- L.L. Ivanov. Antarctica: Livingston Island and Greenwich, Robert, Snow and Smith Islands. Scale 1:120000 topographic map. Troyan: Manfred Wörner Foundation, 2009.
- Antarctic Digital Database (ADD). Scale 1:250000 topographic map of Antarctica. Scientific Committee on Antarctic Research (SCAR). Since 1993, regularly upgraded and updated
