= Karposh (disambiguation) =

Karposh was a rebel leader killed by Ottomans in 1689 after leading the Karposh's Rebellion.

Karposh may also refer to:

== People ==
- Hristijan Todorovski Karpoš, a Macedonian partisan who participated in the National Liberation War of Macedonia.

== Places ==
- Karpoš Municipality of Skopje
- Karposh Point, a toponym in the South Shetland Islands, Antarctica
