= St. Sofroniy Knoll =

Mountain in Antarctica

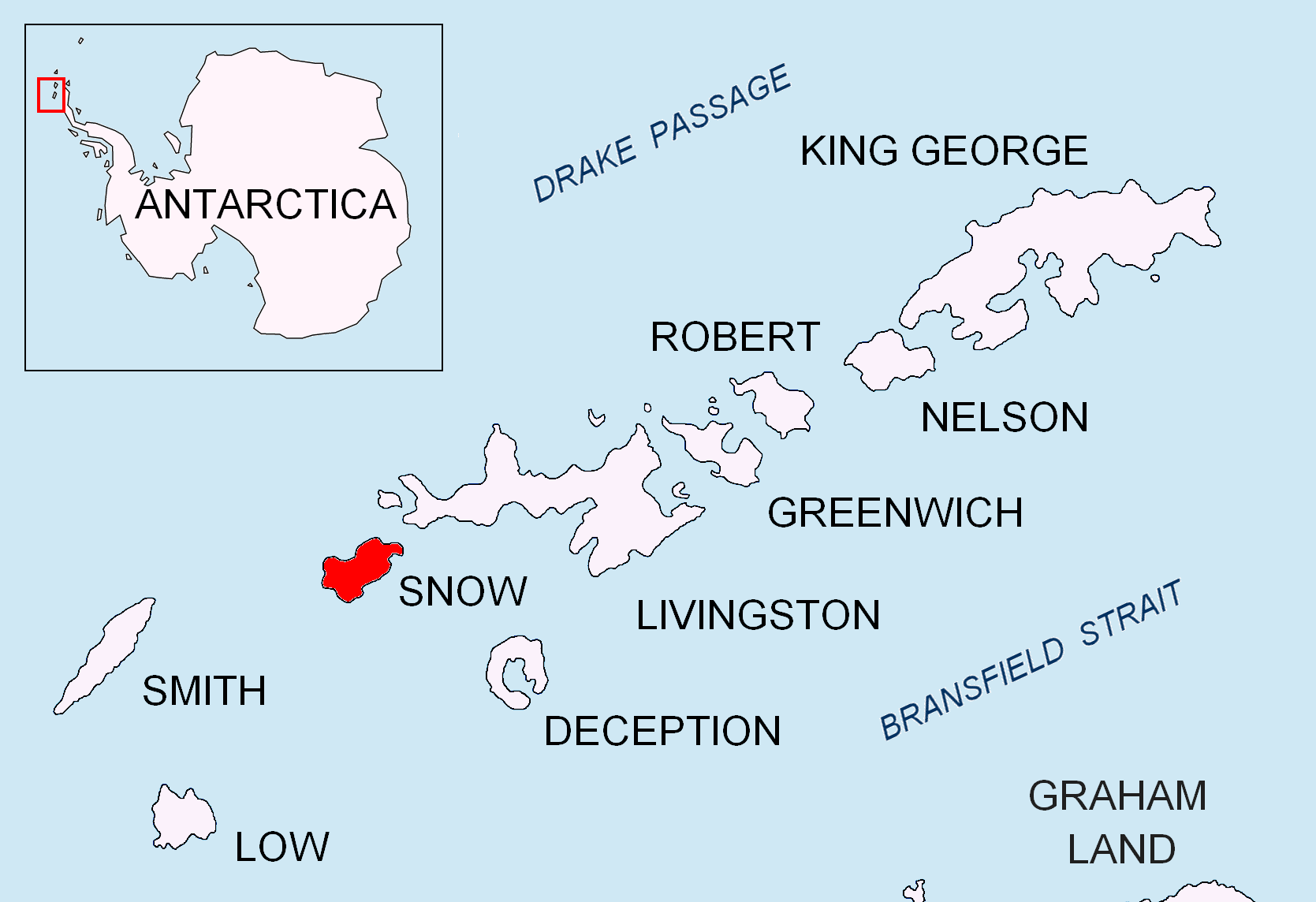
Location of Snow Island in the South Shetland Islands

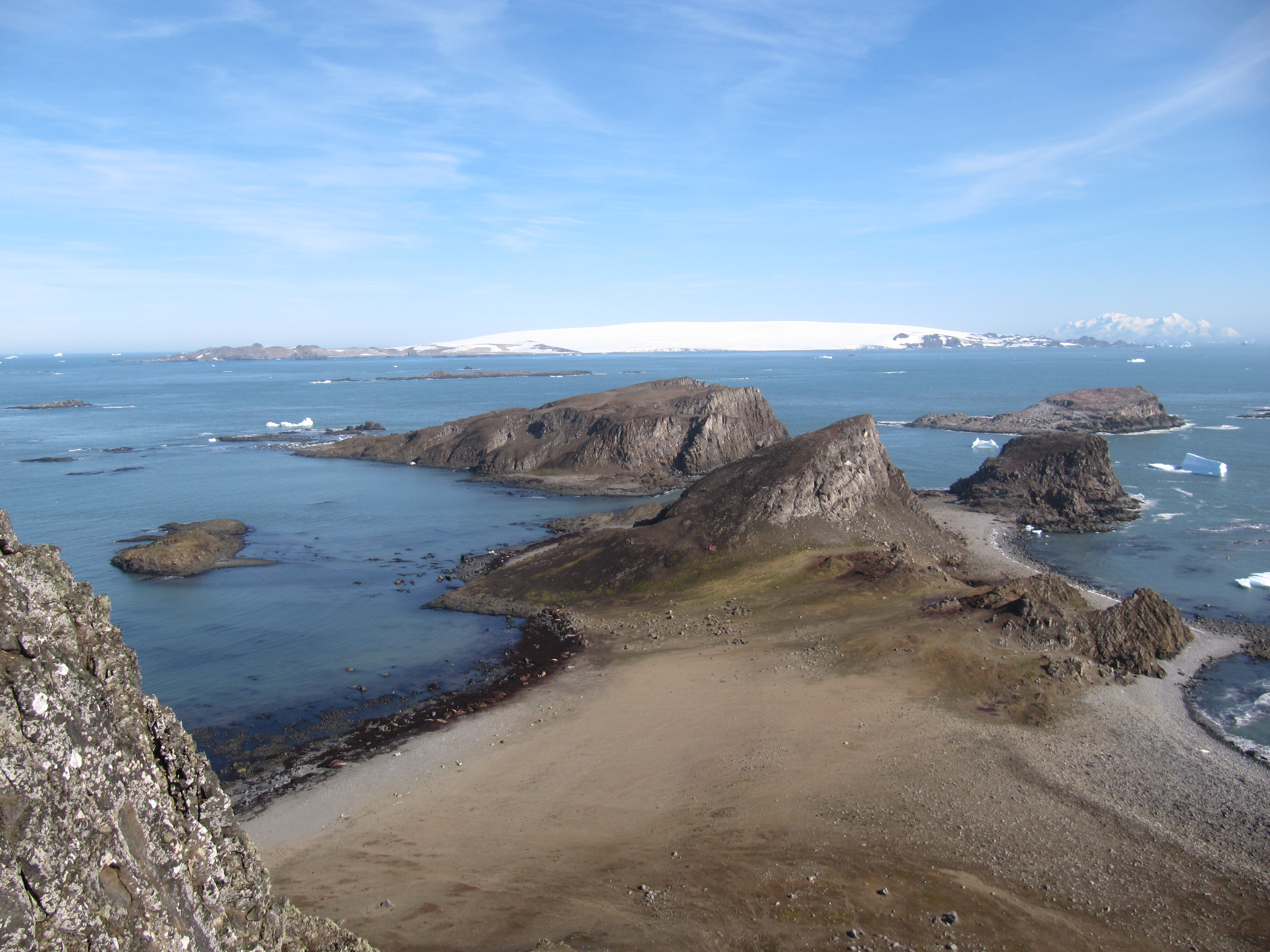
Devils Point from Lucifer Crags, and Snow Island in the background with President Head and St. Sofroniy Knoll on its left side

Topographic map of Livingston Island, Greenwich, Robert, Snow and Smith Islands

St. Sofroniy Knoll (Bulgarian: Св. Софрониева могила, ‘Sv. Sofronieva Mogila’ \ sve-'ti so-'fro-ni-e-va mo-'gi-la\) is the hill rising to 107 m on the small ice-free peninsula of President Head in the northeast extremity of Snow Island in the South Shetland Islands, Antarctica. It is situated 1.3 km southwest of the extreme northeast point of the peninsula, and overlooks Calliope Beach on the west-northwest and Oeagrus Beach on the west.

The knoll is named after St. Sofroniy Vrachanski (Sophronius of Vratsa, born Stoyko Vladislavov; 1739–1813), a leading figure in the Bulgarian National Revival.

== Location ==
St. Sofroniy Knoll is located at 62°43′49″S 61°13′12″W. British mapping in 1968, Bulgarian in 2009.

== Map ==
- L.L. Ivanov. Antarctica: Livingston Island and Greenwich, Robert, Snow and Smith Islands. Scale 1:120000 topographic map. Troyan: Manfred Wörner Foundation, 2009. ISBN 978-954-92032-6-4
