= Elysian Beach =

Antarctic beach

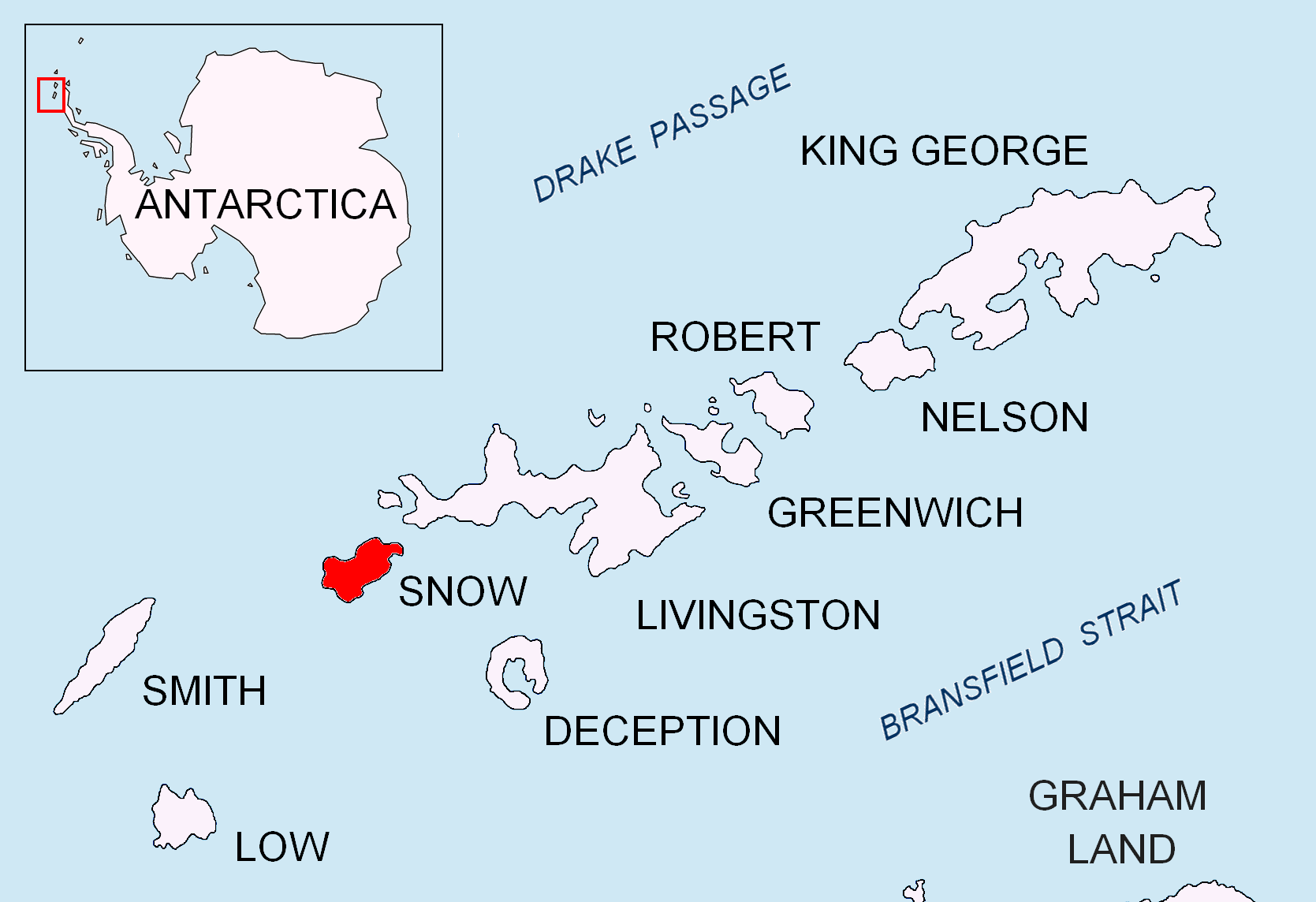
Location of Snow Island in the South Shetland Islands

Topographic map of Livingston, Greenwich, Robert, Snow and Smith Islands

Elysian Beach (Bulgarian: Елисейски бряг, romanized: Eliseyski bryag, IPA: [ɛliˈsɛjski ˈbrʲak]) is the ice-free 2 km long beach on the east side of Byewater Point on the northwest coast of Snow Island in the South Shetland Islands, Antarctica. The area was visited by early 19th century sealers.

The feature is named after the Elysian Fields, part of the underworld in Greek mythology.

== Location ==
Elysian Beach is centred at 62°45′05″S 61°29′00″W, which is 6.25 km west-southwest of Irnik Point. Bulgarian mapping in 2009 and 2017.

== Maps ==
- L. Ivanov. Antarctica: Livingston Island and Greenwich, Robert, Snow and Smith Islands. Scale 1:120000 topographic map. Troyan: Manfred Wörner Foundation, 2010. ISBN 978-954-92032-9-5 (First edition 2009. ISBN 978-954-92032-6-4)
- L. Ivanov. Antarctica: Livingston Island and Smith Island. Scale 1:100000 topographic map. Manfred Wörner Foundation, 2017. ISBN 978-619-90008-3-0
- Antarctic Digital Database (ADD). Scale 1:250000 topographic map of Antarctica. Scientific Committee on Antarctic Research (SCAR). Since 1993, regularly upgraded and updated
