= Brauro Cove =

Antarctic cove

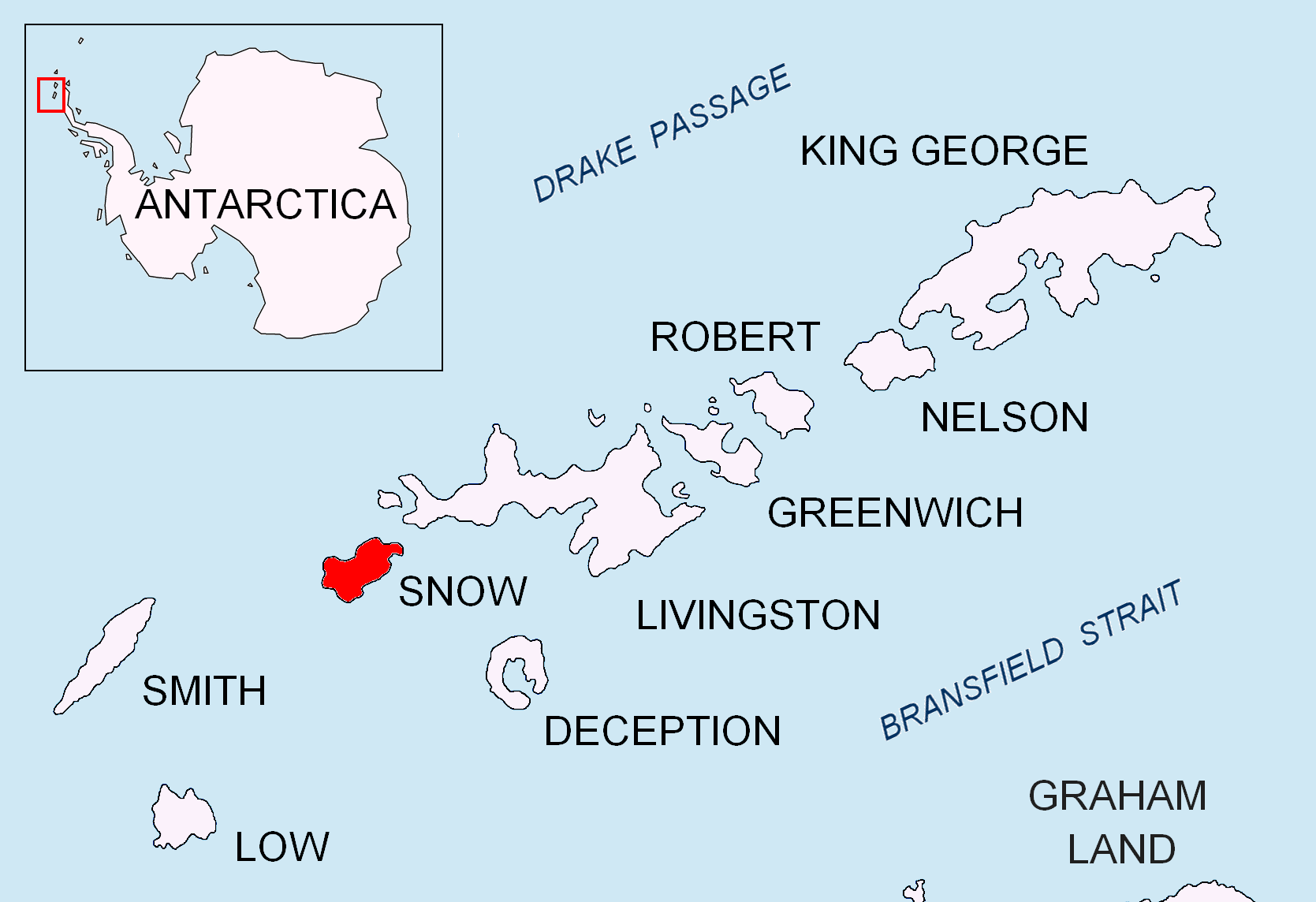
Location of Snow Island in the South Shetland Islands

Topographic map of Livingston, Greenwich, Robert, Snow and Smith Islands

Brauro Cove (Bulgarian: Ивайлов залив, ‘Ivaylov Zaliv’ \i-'vay-lov 'za-liv\) is the 1.93 km wide cove indenting for 620 m the northwest coast of Snow Island in the South Shetland Islands, Antarctica. It is entered southwest of Mezdra Point and northeast of Irnik Point.

The feature is named after the Thracian goddess Brauro.

== Location ==
Brauro Cove is centred at 62°43′15″S 61°21′20″W. British mapping in 1968, Bulgarian in 2009 and 2017.

== Maps ==
- Livingston Island to King George Island. Scale 1:200000. Admiralty Chart 1776. UK Hydrographic Office, 1968
- L.L. Ivanov. Antarctica: Livingston Island and Greenwich, Robert, Snow and Smith Islands. Scale 1:120000 topographic map. Troyan: Manfred Wörner Foundation, 2009. ISBN 978-954-92032-6-4
- L.L. Ivanov. Antarctica: Livingston Island and Smith Island. Scale 1:100000 topographic map. Manfred Wörner Foundation, 2017. ISBN 978-619-90008-3-0
- Antarctic Digital Database (ADD). Scale 1:250000 topographic map of Antarctica. Scientific Committee on Antarctic Research (SCAR). Since 1993, regularly upgraded and updated
