= Elysium =

Afterlife in Greek mythology

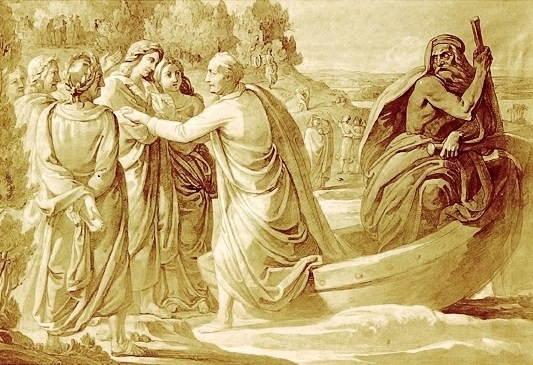
Goethe's Ankunft im Elysia by Franz Nadorp

Elysium (/ɪˈlɪziəm/ or /ɪˈlɪʒiəm/ ih-LIZ(H)-ee-əm), otherwise known as the Elysian Fields (Ancient Greek: Ἠλύσιον πεδίον, Ēlýsion pedíon), Elysian Plains or Elysian Realm, is a conception of the afterlife that developed over time and was maintained by some Greek religious and philosophical sects and cults. It was initially separated from the Greek underworld—the realm of Hades. Only mortals related to the gods and other heroes could be admitted past the river Styx. Later, the conception of who could enter was expanded to include those chosen by the gods, the righteous, and the heroic. They would remain at the Elysian Fields after death, to live a blessed and happy afterlife, and indulge in whatever they had enjoyed in life.

The Elysian Fields were, according to Homer, located on the western edge of the Earth by the stream of Oceanus. In the time of the Greek poet Hesiod, Elysium would also be known as the "Fortunate Isles", or the "Isles (or Islands) of the Blessed", located in the western ocean at the end of the earth. The Isles of the Blessed would be reduced to a single island by the Theban poet Pindar, describing it as having shady parks, with residents indulging in athletic and musical pastimes.

The ruler of Elysium varies from author to author: Pindar and Hesiod name Cronus as the ruler, while the poet Homer in the Odyssey describes fair-haired Rhadamanthus dwelling there. "The Isle of the Blessed" is also featured in the 2nd-century comedic novel A True Story by Lucian of Samosata.

== Etymology ==
The word Elysium derives via Latin from the Ancient Greek Ēlysion (pedion) "Elysian (field)", ultimately of unknown origin. Eustathius of Thessalonica associated the word Elysion (Ἠλύσιον) with ἀλυουσας alyousas (itself from the verb ἀλύω alyō, "to be deeply stirred from joy") or from ἀλύτως alytōs, synonymous of ἀφθάρτως (ἄφθαρτος, "incorruptible"), referring to souls' life in this place. Another suggestion is from the stem ελυθ- elyth-, itself from ἔρχομαι ("to come").

== Classical literature ==
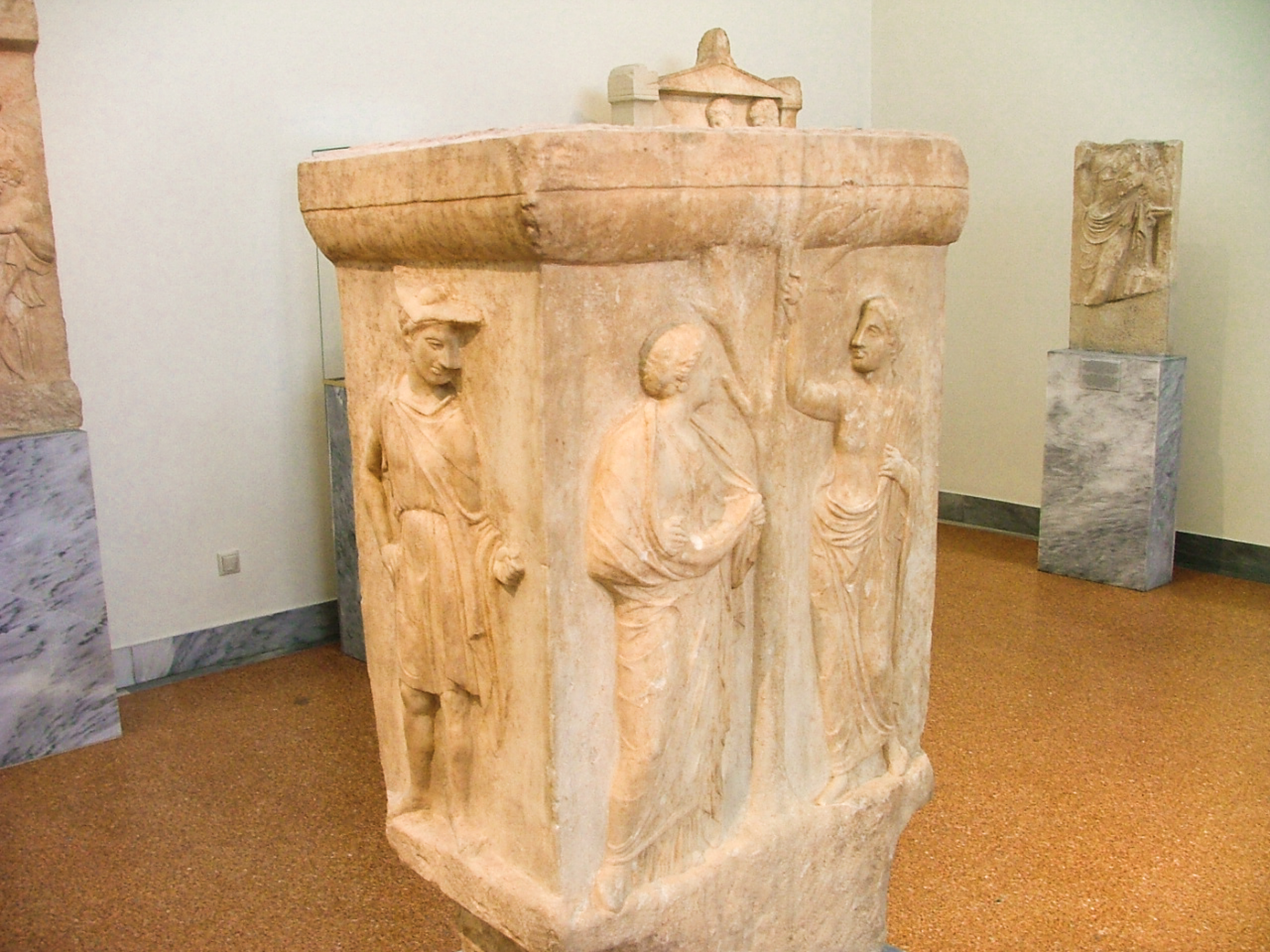
Ancient Greek funerary vase (5th century BC). On the face a young woman and a young man pick fruit from a tree. This depicts the afterlife in the Elysian Fields, where the blessed dead enjoyed golden fruits.

In Homer's Odyssey, Elysium is described as a paradise:

to the Elysian plain...where life is easiest for men. No snow is there, nor heavy storm, nor ever rain, but ever does Ocean send up blasts of the shrill-blowing West Wind that they may give cooling to men.

— Homer, Odyssey (4.560–565)

The Greek poet Hesiod refers to the "Isles of the Blest" in his didactic poem Works and Days. In his book Greek Religion, Walter Burkert notes the connection with the motif of far-off Dilmun: "Thus Achilles is transported to the White Isle and becomes the Ruler of the Black Sea, and Diomedes becomes the divine lord of an Adriatic island".

And they live untouched by sorrow in the islands of the blessed along the shore of deep-swirling Ocean, happy heroes for whom the grain-giving earth bears honey-sweet fruit flourishing thrice a year, far from the deathless gods, and Cronos rules over them

— Hesiod, Works and Days (170)

Writing in the 5th century BCE, Pindar's Odes describes the reward waiting for those living a righteous life:

The good receive a life free from toil, not scraping with the strength of their arms the earth, nor the water of the sea, for the sake of a poor sustenance. But in the presence of the honored gods, those who gladly kept their oaths enjoy a life without tears, while the others undergo a toil that is unbearable to look at. Those who have persevered three times, on either side, to keep their souls free from all wrongdoing, follow Zeus' road to the end, to the tower of Cronus, where ocean breezes blow around the island of the blessed, and flowers of gold are blazing, some from splendid trees on land, while water nurtures others. With these wreaths and garlands of flowers they entwine their hands according to the righteous counsels of Rhadamanthys, whom the great father, the husband of Rhea whose throne is above all others, keeps close beside him as his partner

— Pindar, Odes (2.59–75)

In Virgil's Aeneid, Aeneas, like Heracles and Odysseus before him, travels to the underworld. Virgil describes those who will travel to Elysium, and those who will travel to Tartarus:

Night speeds by, And we, Aeneas, lose it in lamenting. Here comes the place where cleaves our way in twain. Thy road, the right, toward Pluto's dwelling goes, And leads us to Elysium. But the left Speeds sinful souls to doom, and is their path To Tartarus th' accurst.

— Virgil, Aeneid (6.539)

Virgil goes on to describe an encounter in Elysium between Aeneas and his father Anchises. Virgil's Elysium knows perpetual spring and shady groves, with its own sun and lit by its own stars: solemque suum, sua sidera norunt.

In no fix'd place the happy souls reside. In groves we live, and lie on mossy beds, By crystal streams, that murmur thro' the meads: But pass yon easy hill, and thence descend; The path conducts you to your journey's end." This said, he led them up the mountain's brow, And shews them all the shining fields below. They wind the hill, and thro' the blissful meadows go.

— Virgil, Aeneid (6.641)

In the Greek historian Plutarch's Life of Sertorius, Elysium is described as:

These are two in number, separated by a very narrow strait; they are ten thousand furlongs distant from Africa, and are called the Islands of the Blest. They enjoy moderate rains at long intervals, and winds which for the most part are soft and precipitate dews, so that the islands not only have a rich soil which is excellent for plowing and planting, but also produce a natural fruit that is plentiful and wholesome enough to feed, without toil or trouble, a leisured folk. Moreover, an air that is salubrious, owing to the climate and the moderate changes in the seasons, prevails on the islands. For the north and east winds which blow out from our part of the world plunge into fathomless space, and, owing to the distance, dissipate themselves and lose their power before they reach the islands; while the south and west winds that envelope the islands sometimes bring in their train soft and intermittent showers, but for the most part cool them with moist breezes and gently nourish the soil. Therefore a firm belief has made its way, even to the Barbarians, that here is the Elysian Field and the abode of the blessed, of which Homer sang.

— Plutarch, Life of Sertorius, VIII, 2

Diodorus, in his first book, suggested that the Elysian fields which were much celebrated in ancient Greek poetry, corresponded to the beautiful plains in the neighborhood of Memphis which contained the tombs of that capital city of Egypt. He further intimated that the Greek prophet Orpheus composed his fables about the afterlife when he traveled to Egypt and saw the customs of the Egyptians regarding the rites of the dead.

== Post-classical literature ==
Elysium as a pagan expression for paradise would eventually pass into usage by early Christian writers.

In Dante's epic The Divine Comedy, Elysium is mentioned as the abode of the blessed in the lower world; mentioned in connection with the meeting of Aeneas with the shade of Anchises in the Elysian Fields.

With such affection did Anchises' shade reach out, if our greatest muse is owed belief, when in Elysium he knew his son.

— Dante, Divina Commedia (Par Canto XV Line 25–27)

In the Renaissance, the heroic population of the Elysian Fields tended to outshine its formerly dreary pagan reputation; the Elysian Fields borrowed some of the bright allure of paradise. In Paris, the Champs-Élysées retain their name of the Elysian Fields, first applied in the late 16th century to a formerly rural outlier beyond the formal parterre gardens behind the royal French palace of the Tuileries.

After the Renaissance, an even cheerier Elysium evolved for some poets. Sometimes it is imagined as a place where heroes have continued their interests from their lives. Others suppose it is a location filled with feasting, sport, song; Joy is the "daughter of Elysium" in Friedrich Schiller's "Ode to Joy". The poet Heinrich Heine explicitly parodied Schiller's sentiment in referring to the Jewish Sabbath food cholent as the "daughter of Elysium" in his poem "Princess Shabbat".

Christian and classical attitudes to the afterlife are contrasted by Christopher Marlowe's Doctor Faustus saying, "This word 'damnation' terrifies not me, For I confound hell in elysium."

In William Shakespeare's Twelfth Night when Viola says "My brother he is in Elysium", she and Elizabethan audiences understood this as Paradise. In Wolfgang Amadeus Mozart's The Magic Flute Papageno compares being in Elysium to winning his ideal woman: "Des Lebens als Weiser mich freun, Und wie im Elysium sein." ("Enjoy life as a wiseman, And feel like I'm in Elysium.")

Miguel de Cervantes' Don Quixote describes Dulcinea del Toboso as "beauty superhuman, since all the impossible and fanciful attributes of beauty which the poets apply to their ladies are verified in her; for her hairs are gold, her forehead Elysian Fields".

In John Ford's 1633 tragedy 'Tis Pity She's a Whore Giovanni seals his requited love for his sister Annabella, stating "And I'de not change it for the best to come: A life of pleasure in Elyzium".

== Modern influence ==
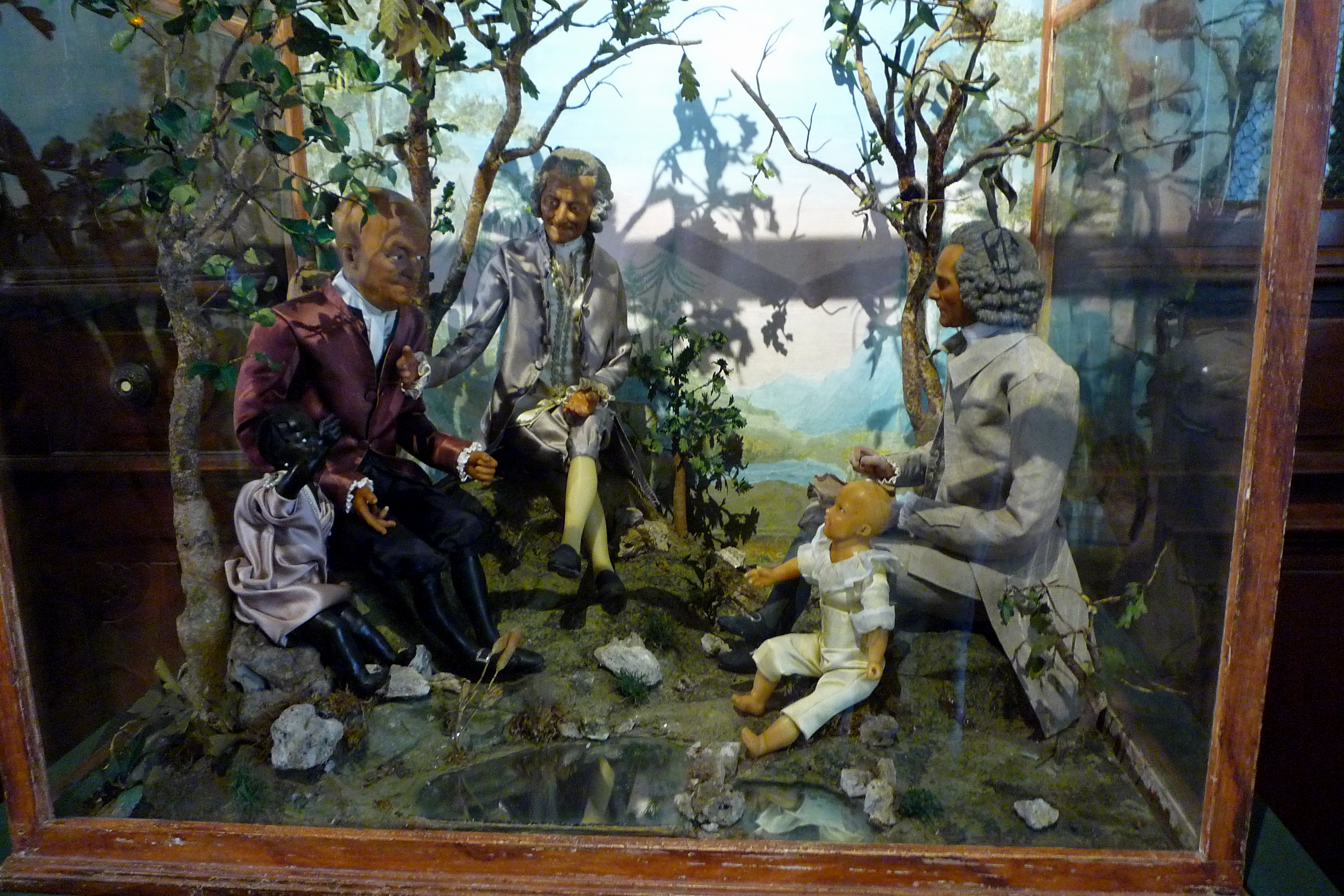
Wax cabinet with the three fathers of the French Revolution, Franklin, Voltaire and Rousseau, installed at Elysium, 1792, (Musée de la Révolution française)

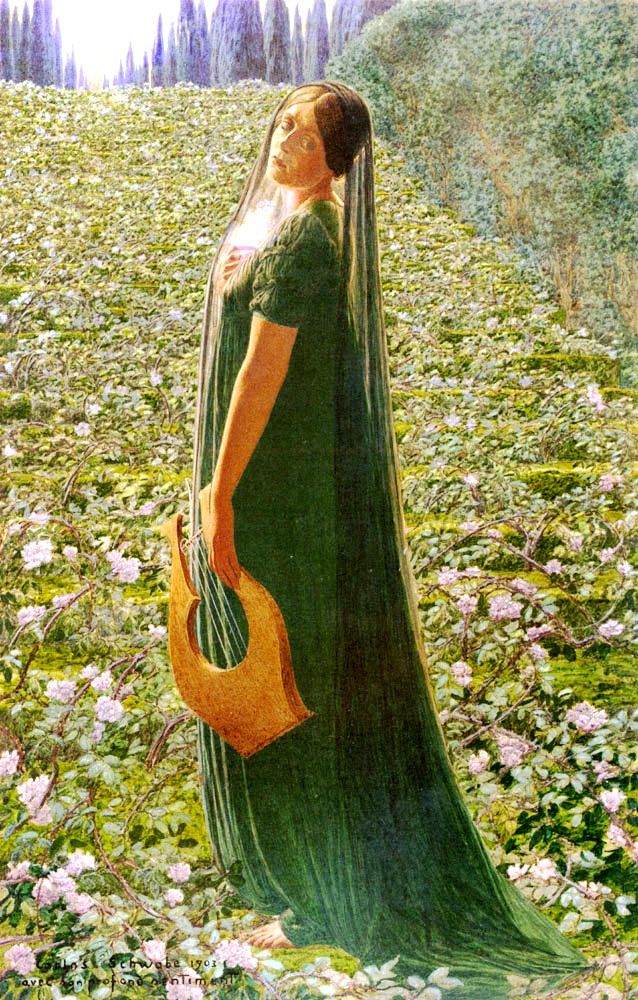
Elysian Fields by Carlos Schwabe, 1903

The term and concept of Elysium has had influence in modern popular culture; references to Elysium can be found in literature, art, film, and music. Examples include the New Orleans neighbourhood of Elysian Fields in Tennessee Williams' A Streetcar Named Desire as the déclassé purgatory where Blanche Dubois lives with Stanley and Stella Kowalski. New Orleans' Elysian Fields also provides the second-act setting of Elmer Rice's The Adding Machine and the musical adaptation. In his poem "Middlesex", John Betjeman describes how a few hedges "Keep alive our lost Elysium – rural Middlesex again". In his poem An Old Haunt, Hugh McFadden sets an Elysian scene in Dublin's St. Stephen's Green park "Very slowly solitude slips round me in St. Stephen's Green. I rest: see pale salmon clouds blossom. I'm back in the fields of Elysium". In Spring and All, William Carlos Williams describes a dying woman's "elysian slobber/upon/the folded handkerchief".

The Champs-Élysées in Paris is French for "Elysian Fields". The nearby Élysée Palace houses the President of the French Republic, for which reason "l'Élysée" frequently appears as a metonym for the French presidency, similar to how "the White House" can metonymically refer to the American presidency, and "No.10 Downing Street" the British prime minister. Elysium and Elysian are also used for numerous other names all over the world – examples include Elysian Fields, Hoboken, New Jersey; Elysian Park, Los Angeles; Elysian Valley, Los Angeles, California; Elysian, Minnesota; and Elysian Fields, Texas.

In Siegfried Sassoon's Memoirs of a Fox-Hunting Man, Sassoon writes "The air was Elysian with early summer". Its use in this context could be prolepsis, as the British countryside he is describing would become the burial ground of his dead comrades and heroes from World War I.

Elysium is referenced in the Schiller poem which inspired Beethoven's "Ode to Joy" (9th symphony, 4th movement) – notably in the excerpt used as the European Anthem. Elysium is also referenced in Mozart's opera Die Zauberflöte (The Magic Flute). It is in Act II when Papageno is feeling very melancholy because he does not have a sweetheart or wife and he is drunk singing the song "Ein Mädchen oder Weibchen" (A Girl or a Wife).

=== Books ===
In David Gemmell's Parmennion series (Lion of Macedon and Dark Prince) and his Troy trilogy, his characters refer to Elysium as the "Hall of Heroes".

=== Film and television ===
The 2013 dystopian film Elysium, starring Matt Damon, used the name Elysium to describe the orbital space station of luxury that the rich live on in contrast to the ravaged Earth that the poor live on.

=== Video games ===
Elysium appears in the Fate of Atlantis DLC of the 2018 video game, Assassin's Creed Odyssey. In the first part of this DLC, The Fields of Elysium, the misthios travels to Elysium which is ruled by members of the precursor civilisation known as the Isu which were then worshipped as the gods of the Greek pantheon.

== Honours ==
Elysian Beach in Antarctica and Elysium Mons on Mars are named after the Elysian Fields, as is the aforementioned avenue des Champs-Élysées.

== See also ==
- Fortunate Isles, mythical islands associated with Elysium
- The other divisions of the Greek underworld, Asphodel and Tartarus
- Golden Bough (mythology)
- Related ideas of paradise like Aaru and Illiyin
