= Karposh Point =

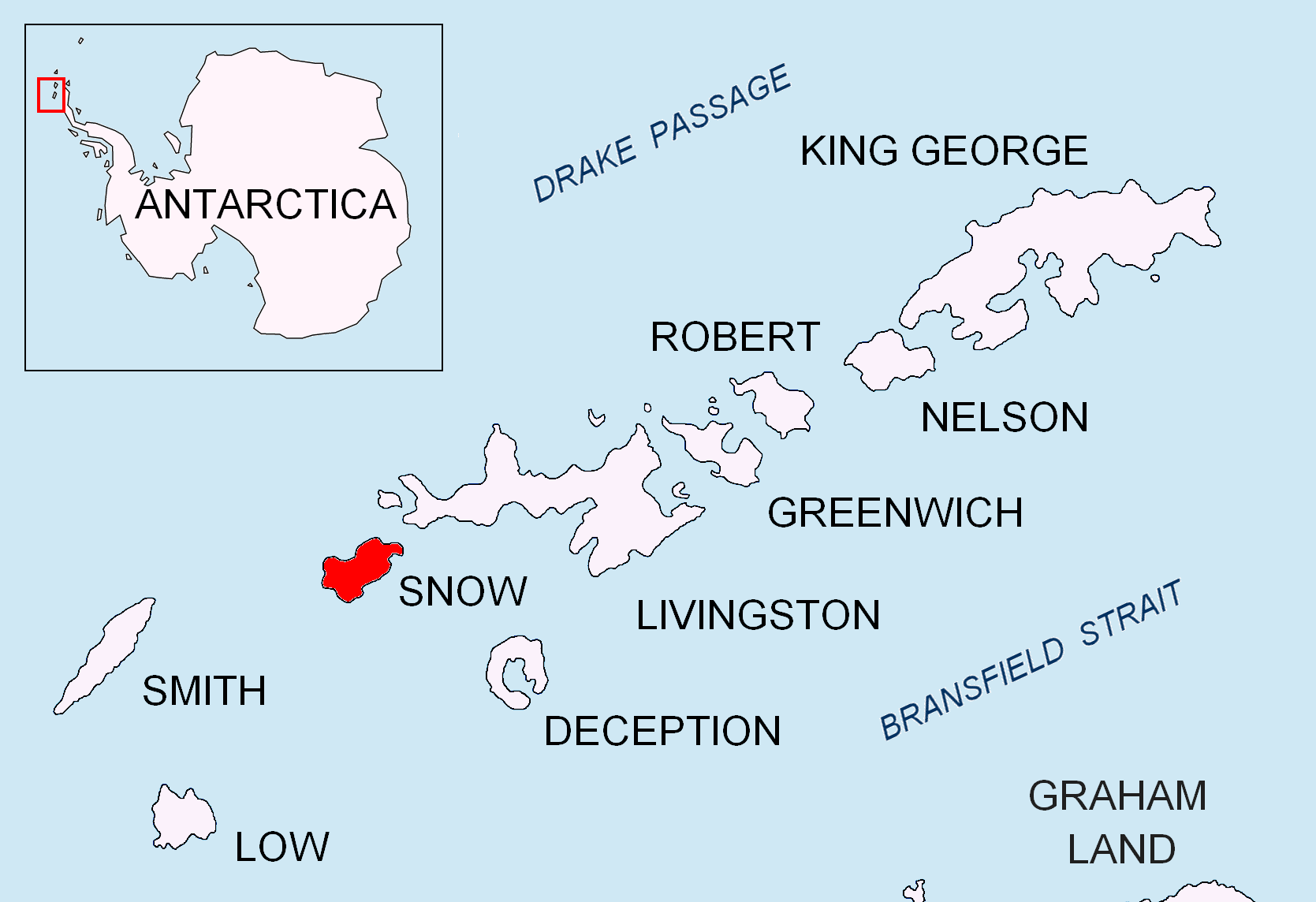
Location of Snow Island in the South Shetland Islands.

Topographic map of Livingston Island, Greenwich, Robert, Snow and Smith Islands.

Karposh Point (Bulgarian: нос Карпош, ‘Nos Karposh’ \'nos 'kar-posh\) is the ice-free point on the north coast of Snow Island in the South Shetland Islands, Antarctica. It is projecting 500 m into Morton Strait, and is situated 2.3 km west of the extreme northeast point of President Head, 2.5 km east-southeast of Gostun Point, and 4.8 km east-southeast of Cape Timblón. Calliope Beach extends for 2.9 km eastwards from the point.

The point is "named after Karposh, leader of a Bulgarian uprising in 1689 AD."

== Location ==
Karposh Point is located at 62°43′23″S 61°15′00″W. British mapping in 1968, Bulgarian in 2009.

== Map ==
- L.L. Ivanov. Antarctica: Livingston Island and Greenwich, Robert, Snow and Smith Islands. Scale 1:120000 topographic map. Troyan: Manfred Wörner Foundation, 2009. ISBN 978-954-92032-6-4
