= Bizone Rock =

Rock in the South Shetland Islands, Antarctica

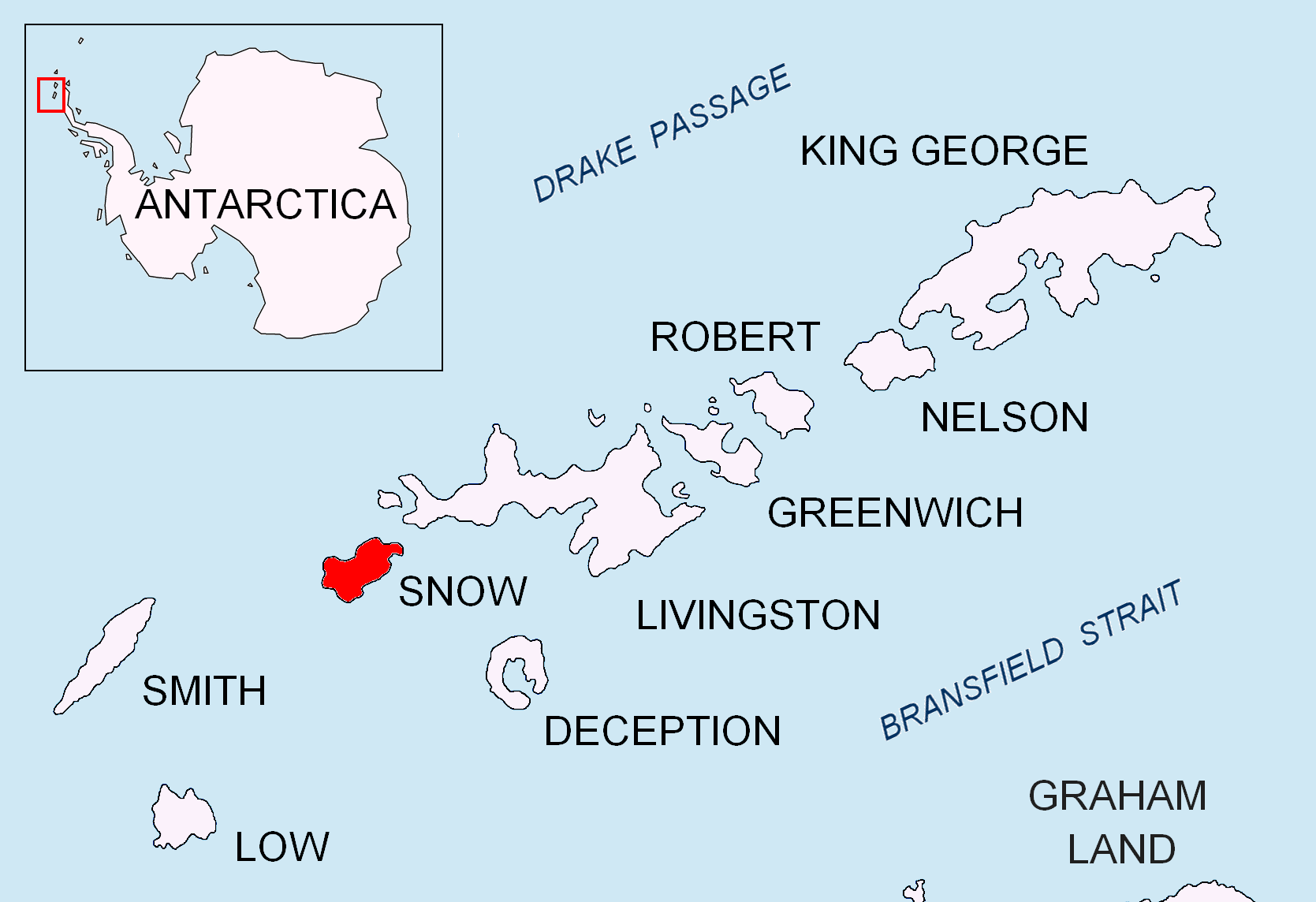
Location of Snow Island in the South Shetland Islands.

Topographic map of Livingston Island, Greenwich, Robert, Snow and Smith Islands.

Bizone Rock (Bulgarian: скала Бизоне, ‘Skala Bizone’ \'ska-la bi-'zo-ne\) is the rock off Snow Island in the South Shetland Islands, Antarctica extending 120 m in southeast–northwest direction and 100 m wide. It is the largest and southeasternmost in a group of several rocks extending 1.84 km in southeast–northwest direction and 1 km in a southwest–northeast direction.

The feature is named after the ancient town of Bizone in northeastern Bulgaria.

== Location ==
Bizone Rock is located at 62°43′30″S 61°27′34″W, which is 4.4 km west of Irnik Point and 3.85 km northeast of Byewater Point. British mapping in 1968, and Bulgarian mapping in 2009.

== Maps ==
- L.L. Ivanov. Antarctica: Livingston Island and Greenwich, Robert, Snow and Smith Islands. Scale 1:120000 topographic map. Troyan: Manfred Wörner Foundation, 2009. ISBN 978-954-92032-6-4 (Updated second edition 2010. ISBN 978-954-92032-9-5)
- Antarctic Digital Database (ADD). Scale 1:250000 topographic map of Antarctica. Scientific Committee on Antarctic Research (SCAR). Since 1993, regularly upgraded and updated.
