= Calliope Beach =

Antarctic beach

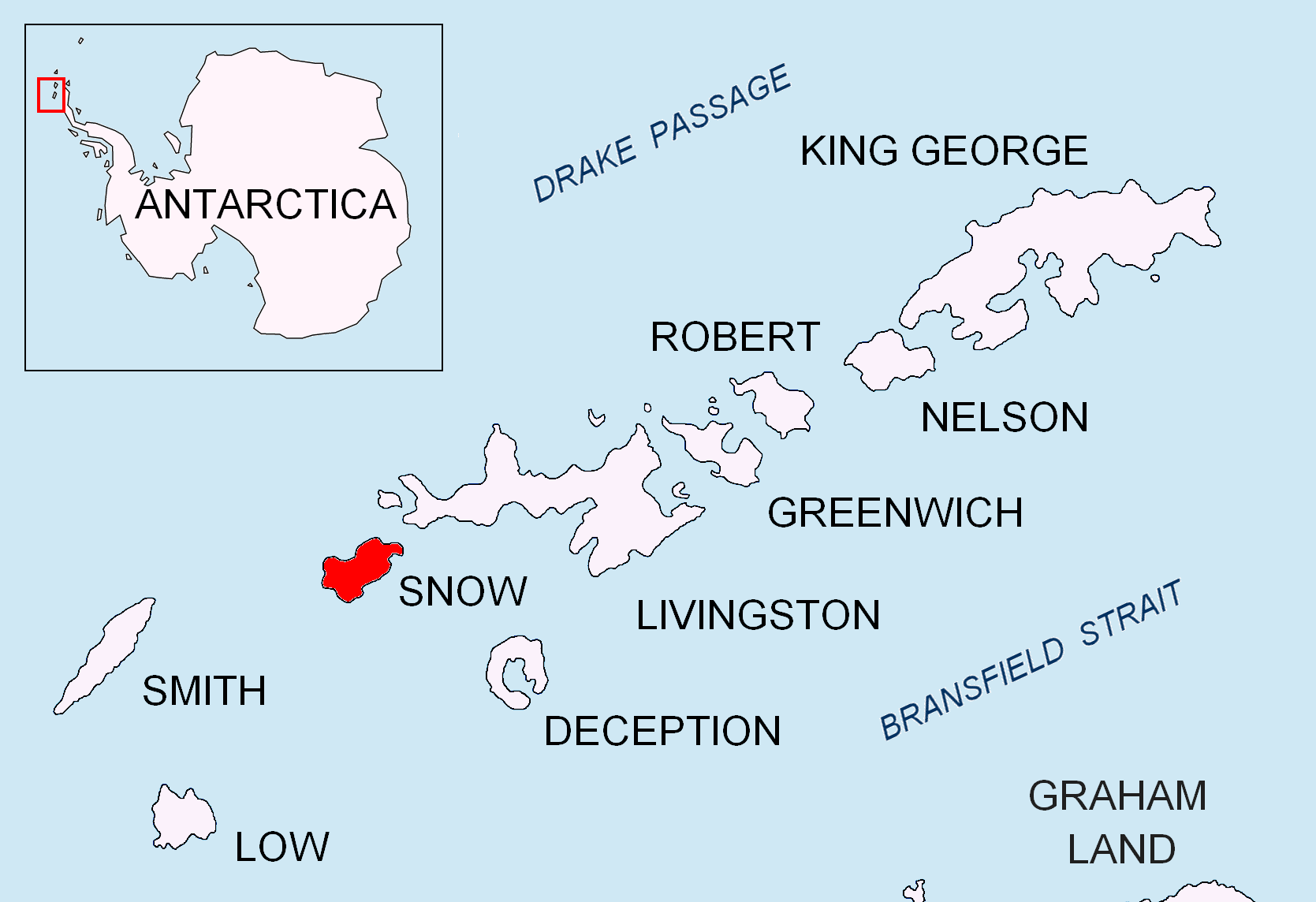
Location of Snow Island in the South Shetland Islands

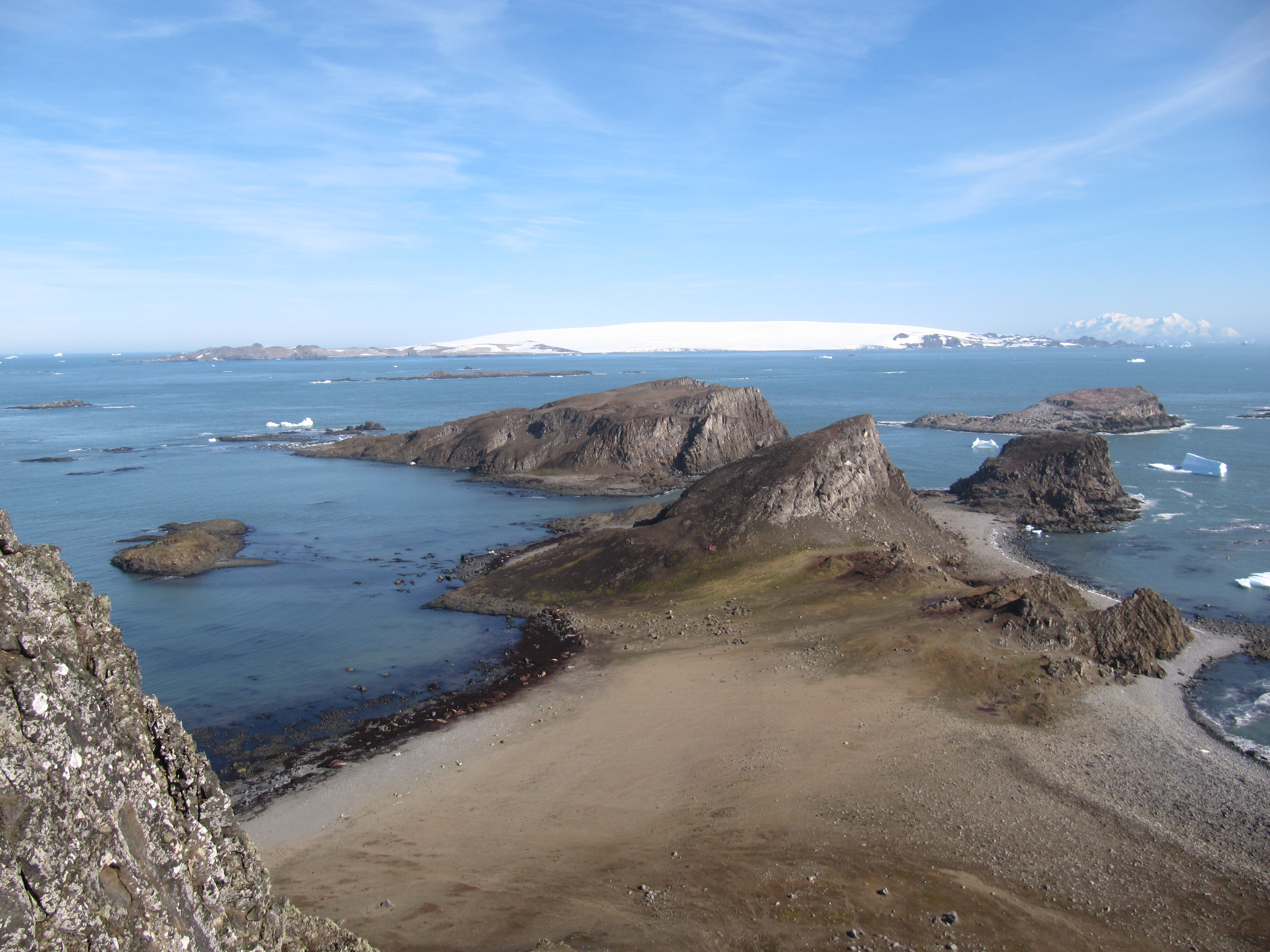
Morton Strait from Livingston Island, with Snow Island in the background featuring Calliope Beach on the left and Linus Beach on the right

Topographic map of Livingston, Greenwich, Robert, Snow and Smith Islands

Calliope Beach (Bulgarian: бряг Калиопа, romanized: bryag Kaliopa, IPA: [ˈbrʲak kɐliˈɔpɐ]) is the ice-free 2.9 km long beach on the north side of President Head, Snow Island in the South Shetland Islands, Antarctica. It is part of the south coast of Morton Strait, situated east of Karposh Point and north of Oeagrus Beach. The area was visited by early 19th century sealers.

The feature is named after the nymph Calliope, mother of the mythical Thracian musician Orpheus.

== Location ==
Calliope Beach is centred at 62°43′50″S 61°14′00″W. Bulgarian mapping in 2009 and 2017.

== Maps ==
- L. Ivanov. Antarctica: Livingston Island and Greenwich, Robert, Snow and Smith Islands. Scale 1:120000 topographic map. Troyan: Manfred Wörner Foundation, 2010. ISBN 978-954-92032-9-5 (First edition 2009. ISBN 978-954-92032-6-4)
- L. Ivanov. Antarctica: Livingston Island and Smith Island. Scale 1:100000 topographic map. Manfred Wörner Foundation, 2017. ISBN 978-619-90008-3-0
- Antarctic Digital Database (ADD). Scale 1:250000 topographic map of Antarctica. Scientific Committee on Antarctic Research (SCAR). Since 1993, regularly upgraded and updated
