= Mezdra Point =

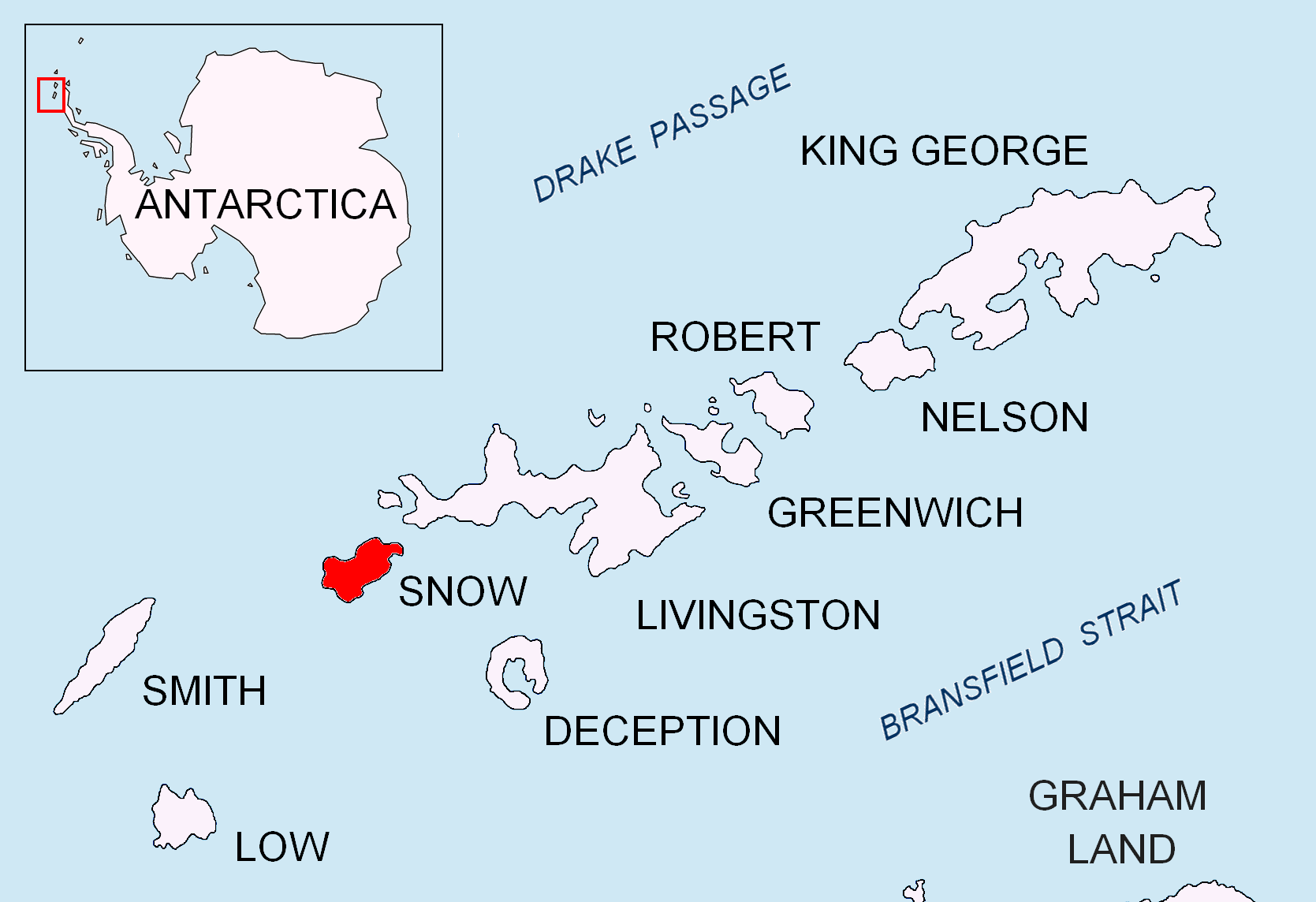
Location of Snow Island in the South Shetland Islands.

Topographic map of Livingston Island, Greenwich, Robert, Snow and Smith Islands.

Mezdra Point (Bulgarian: нос Мездра, ‘Nos Mezdra’ \'nos 'mez-dra\) is the ice-free northeast entrance point of Brauro Cove on the northwest coast of Snow Island in the South Shetland Islands, Antarctica. It is situated 1.41 km southwest of Cape Timblón, and 1.91 km northeast of Irnik Point.

The point is named after the town of Mezdra in northwestern Bulgaria.

== Location ==
Mezdra Point is located at 62°42′46″S 61°21′14″W. British mapping in 1968, Bulgarian in 2009.

== Map ==
- L.L. Ivanov. Antarctica: Livingston Island and Greenwich, Robert, Snow and Smith Islands. Scale 1:120000 topographic map. Troyan: Manfred Wörner Foundation, 2009. ISBN 978-954-92032-6-4
