= President Head =

Headland in the South Shetland Islands, Antarctica

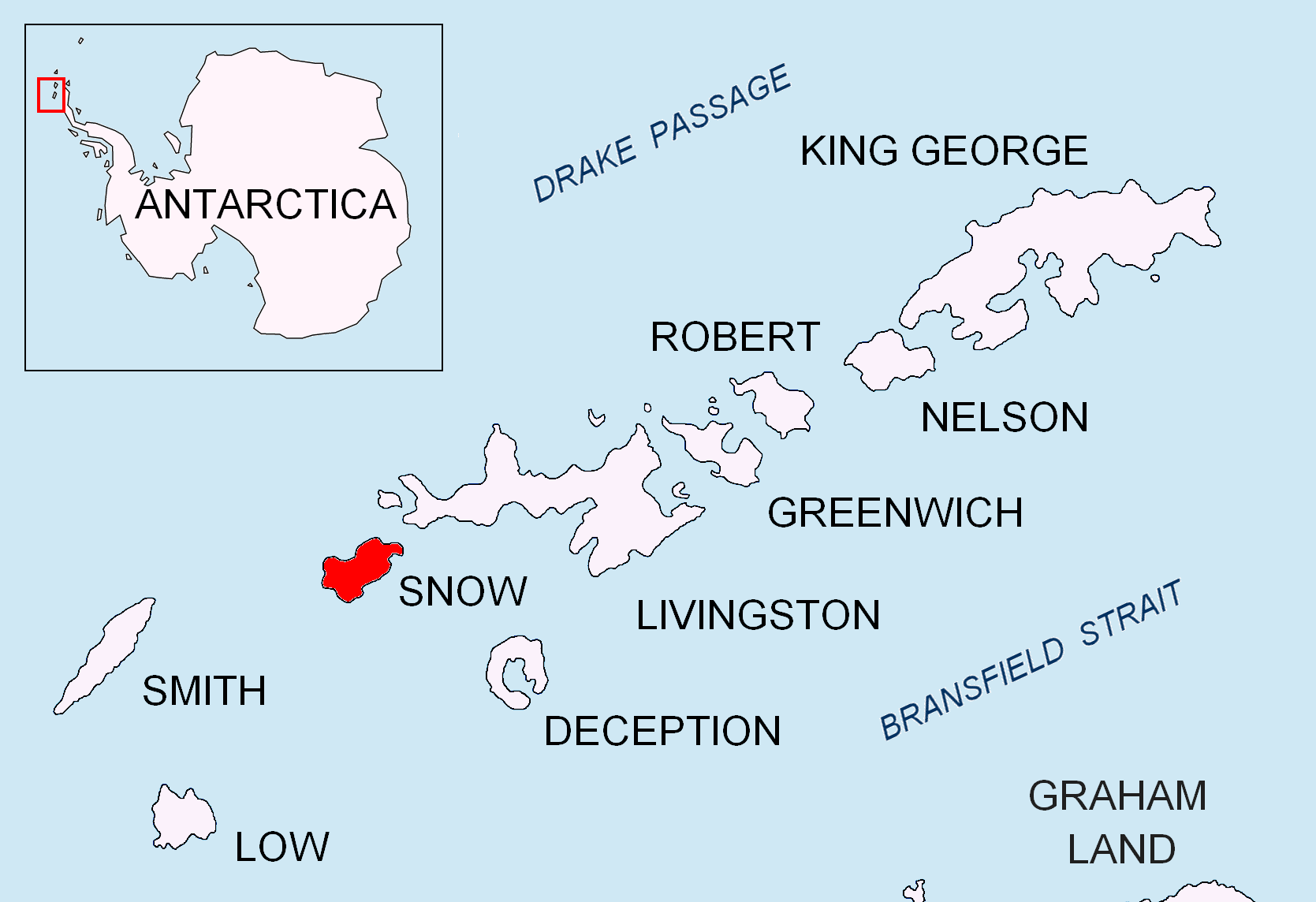
Location of Snow Island in the South Shetland Islands

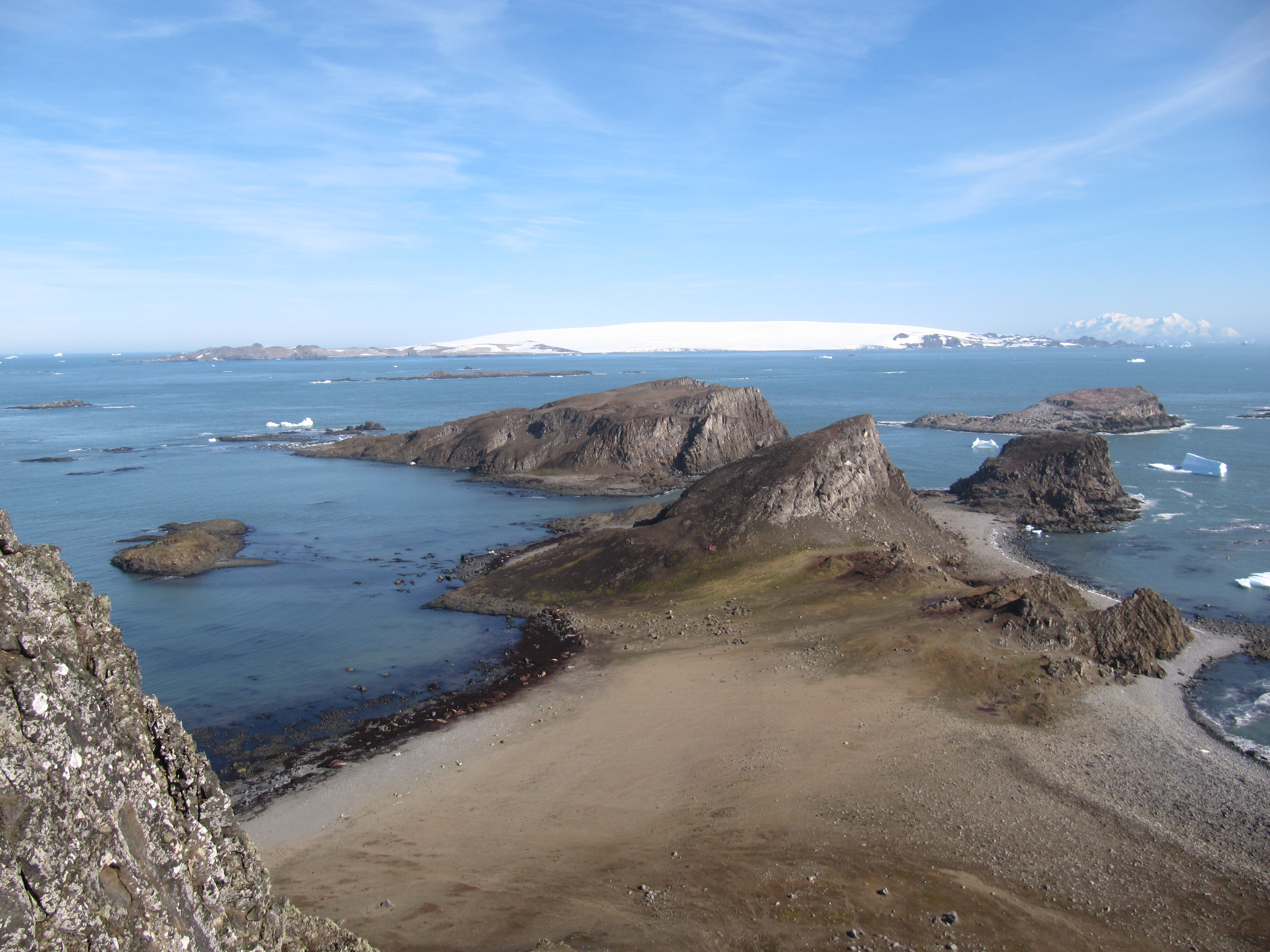
Devils Point from Lucifer Crags, and Snow Island in the background with President Head on its left side

Topographic map of Livingston Island, Greenwich, Robert, Snow and Smith Islands

President Head (62°43′34.7″S 61°12′05.8″W) is a headland forming the east extremity of Snow Island, in the South Shetland Islands, Antarctica. It extends 2.6 km in east-northeast direction, rising to 107 m at St. Sofroniy Knoll. The adjacent ice-free area is ca. 303 hectares (750 acres), and includes Calliope Beach on the north side of the peninsula and Oeagrus Beach on its south side.

The name "President Island" was applied by the Stonington sealers in 1820–21 to Snow Island, but that name did not become established. "President Head" was applied by the United Kingdom Antarctic Place-Names Committee (UK-APC) in 1961 in order to preserve the name on this island.

== Maps ==
- L.L. Ivanov et al. Antarctica: Livingston Island and Greenwich Island, South Shetland Islands. Scale 1:100000 topographic map. Sofia: Antarctic Place-names Commission of Bulgaria, 2005.
