= Gostun Point =

Point on Snow Island, Antarctica

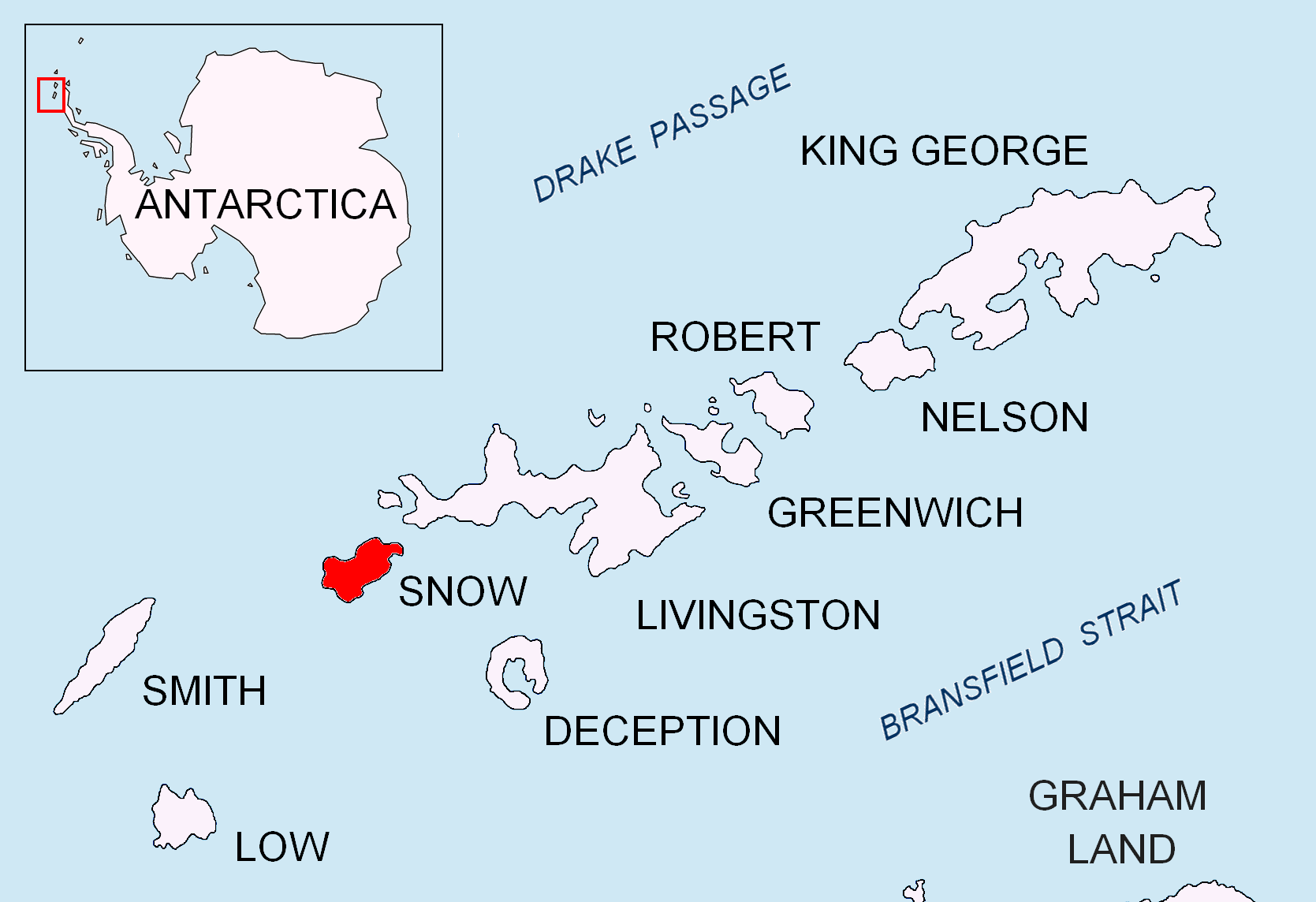
Location of Snow Island in the South Shetland Islands.

Topographic map of Livingston Island, Greenwich, Robert, Snow and Smith Islands.

Gostun Point (Bulgarian: нос Гостун, ‘Nos Gostun’ \'nos go-'stun\) is the ice-free point on the north coast of Snow Island in the South Shetland Islands, Antarctica situated 2.4 km west-northwest of Karposh Point, and 2.45 km east-southeast of Cape Timblón.

The point is named after the Bulgar ruler Khan Gostun, predecessor of the creator of Old Great Bulgaria Khan Kubrat (7th Century AD).

== Location ==
Gostun Point is located at 62°42′49″S 61°17′22″W. British mapping in 1968, Bulgarian in 2009.

== Map ==
- L.L. Ivanov. Antarctica: Livingston Island and Greenwich, Robert, Snow and Smith Islands. Scale 1:120000 topographic map. Troyan: Manfred Wörner Foundation, 2009. ISBN 978-954-92032-6-4
