= Irnik Point =

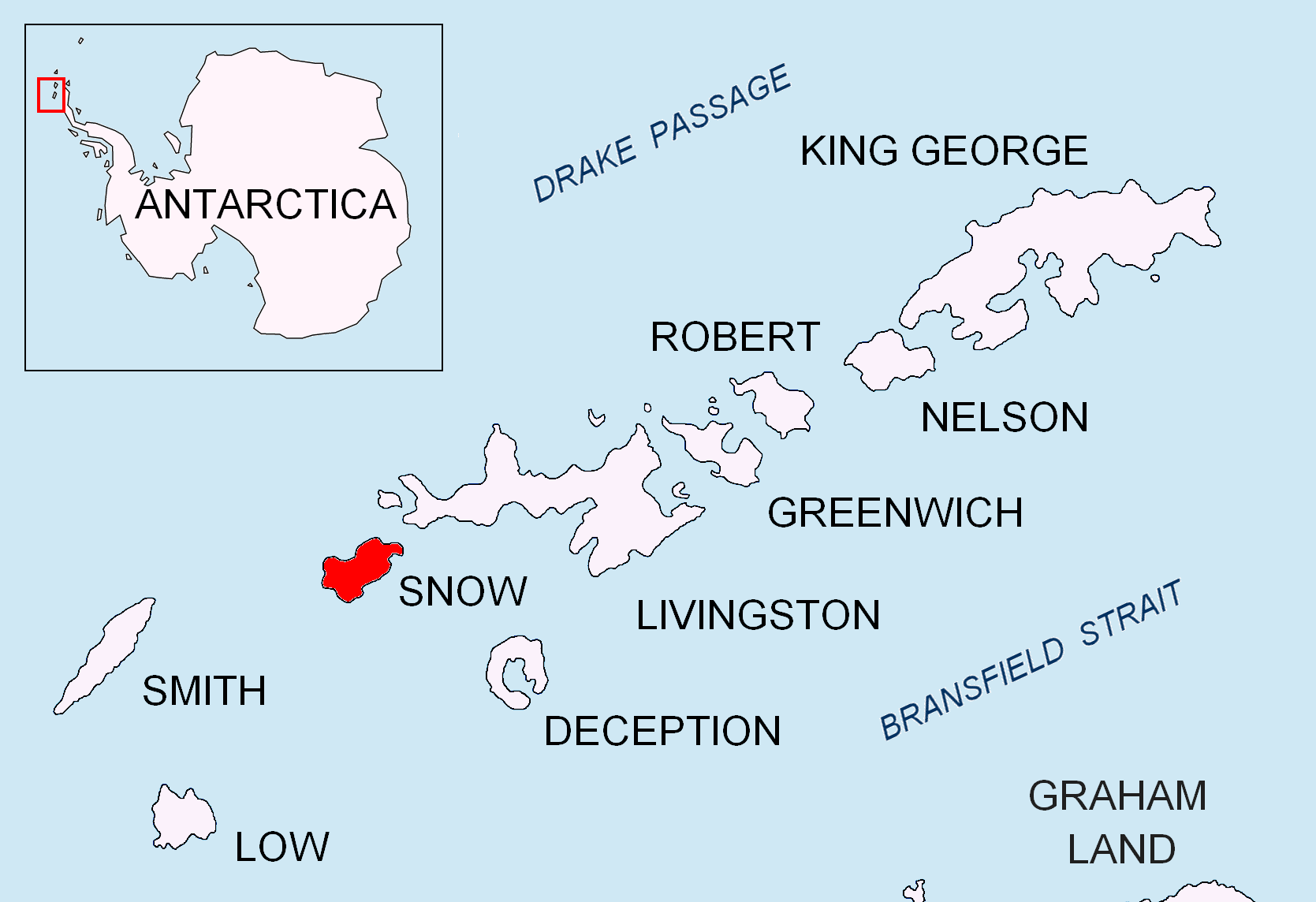
Location of Snow Island in the South Shetland Islands.

Topographic map of Livingston Island, Greenwich, Robert, Snow and Smith Islands.

Irnik Point (Bulgarian: нос Ирник, ‘Nos Irnik’ \'nos ir-'nik\) is the ice-free southwest entrance point to Brauro Cove on the northwest coast of Snow Island in the South Shetland Islands, Antarctica. It is situated 3.5 km southwest of Cape Timblón, 2 km southwest of Mezdra Point, and 7.4 km northeast of Byewater Point.

The point is named after the legendary Khan Irnik listed in the 8th-century 'Nominalia of the Bulgarian Khans', considered to be the same as one of Attila's sons, Ernak.

== Location ==
Irnik Point is located at 62°43′37″S 61°22′20″W. British mapping in 1968, Bulgarian in 2009.

== Map ==
- L.L. Ivanov. Antarctica: Livingston Island and Greenwich, Robert, Snow and Smith Islands. Scale 1:120000 topographic map. Troyan: Manfred Wörner Foundation, 2009. ISBN 978-954-92032-6-4
- Antarctic Digital Database (ADD). Scale 1:250000 topographic map of Antarctica. Scientific Committee on Antarctic Research (SCAR). Since 1993, regularly upgraded and updated.
- L.L. Ivanov. Antarctica: Livingston Island and Smith Island. Scale 1:100000 topographic map. Manfred Wörner Foundation, 2017. ISBN 978-619-90008-3-0
