= Byewater Point =

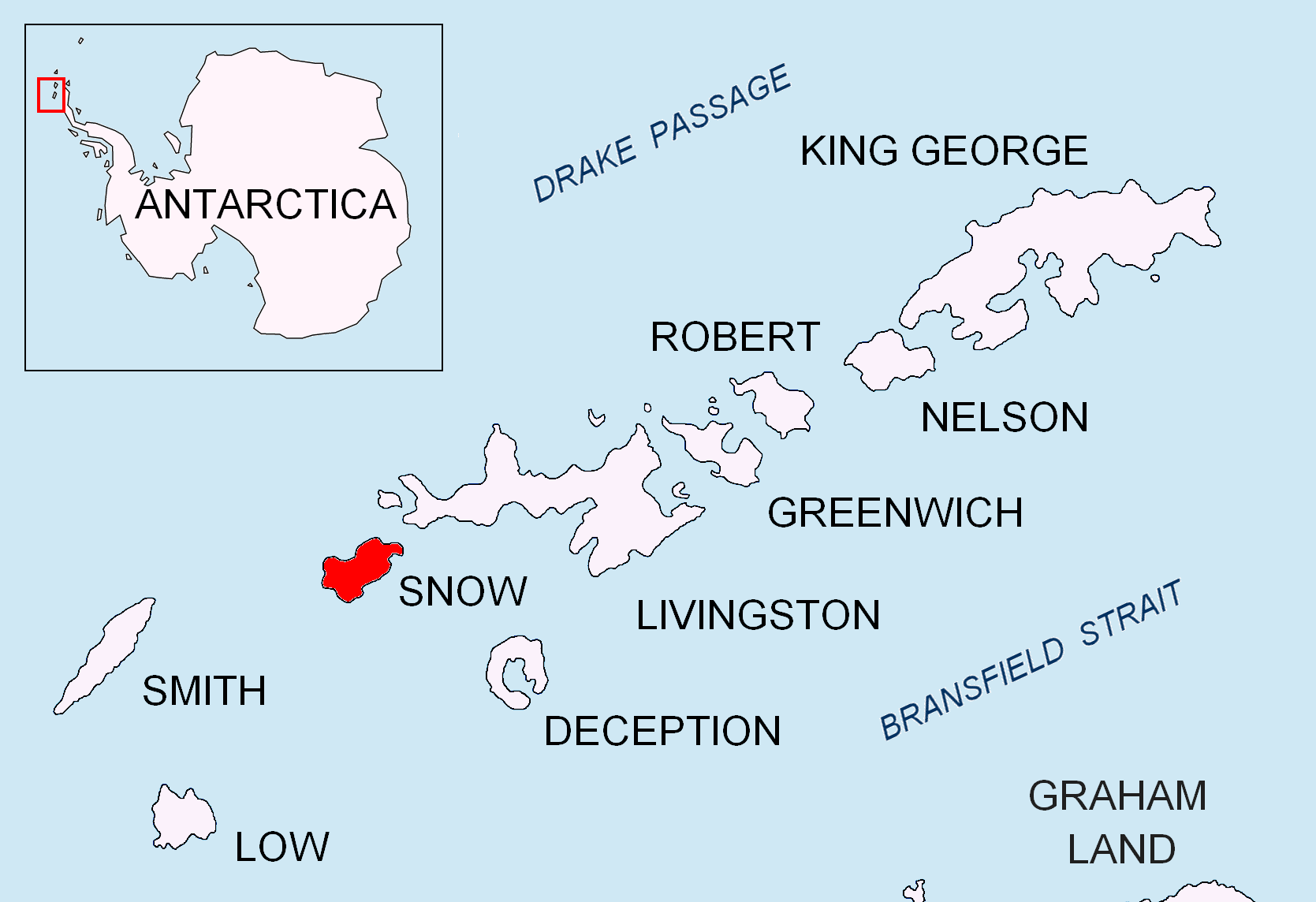
Location of Snow Island in the South Shetland Islands.

Topographic map of Livingston Island, Greenwich, Robert, Snow and Smith Islands.

Byewater Point is the rocky point forming the northwest extremity of Snow Island in the South Shetland Islands, Antarctica. It is a north entrance point for Boyd Strait. Elysian Beach extends 2 km (1.2 mi) eastwards from the point. The area was visited by 19th century sealers.

The feature was charted and named in 1829 by the British naval expedition under Captain Henry Foster.

== Location ==
The cape is located at 62°45′10″S 61°30′07.4″W which is 10.3 km (6.4 mi) southwest of Cape Timblón, 10.58 km (6.57 mi) north-northwest of Cape Conway and 42.8 km (26.6 mi) east-northeast of Cape Smith, Smith Island (British mapping in 1968, Argentine in 1991, Bulgarian in 2009).

== Map ==
- L.L. Ivanov. Antarctica: Livingston Island and Greenwich, Robert, Snow and Smith Islands. Scale 1:120000 topographic map. Troyan: Manfred Wörner Foundation, 2009. ISBN 978-954-92032-6-4
