= List of glaciers of James Ross Island and Graham Land =

Following is a list of glaciers of James Ross Island and Graham Land in Antarctica. This list may not reflect recently named glaciers in James Ross Island and Graham Land.

== James Ross Island ==
- Ball Glacier
- Coley Glacier
- Gourdon Glacier
- Hobbs Glacier
- Howarth Glacier
- Ineson Glacier
- Swift Glacier
- Tait Glacier

== Adelaide Island ==
- Horton Glacier
- Hurley Glacier
- Shambles Glacier
- Sheldon Glacier
- Sloman Glacier
- Turner Glacier

== Antarctic Peninsula ==
- Aagaard Glacier
- Agalina Glacier
- Ahlmann Glacier
- Akaga Glacier
- Alberts Glacier
- Albone Glacier
- Aleksiev Glacier
- Ambergris Glacier
- Anderson Glacier
- Andrew Glacier
- Antevs Glacier
- Aphrodite Glacier
- Apollo Glacier
- Arago Glacier
- Archer Glacier
- Astudillo Glacier
- Athene Glacier
- Attlee Glacier
- Avsyuk Glacier
- Bader Glacier
- Bagshawe Glacier
- Balch Glacier
- Barnes Glacier
- Bayly Glacier
- Beaglehole Glacier
- Belgica Glacier
- Belogradchik Glacier
- Bevin Glacier
- Bilgeri Glacier
- Bills Gulch
- Birley Glacier
- Blagun Glacier
- Blanchard Glacier
- Blériot Glacier
- Bolton Glacier
- Bombardier Glacier
- Boryana Glacier
- Bozhinov Glacier
- Bradford Glacier
- Breguet Glacier
- Breitfuss Glacier
- Brenitsa Glacier
- Brückner Glacier
- Bucher Glacier
- Bussey Glacier
- Butamya Glacier
- Byway Glacier
- Cadman Glacier
- Carbutt Glacier
- Cardell Glacier
- Caulfeild Glacier
- Cayley Glacier
- Centurion Glacier
- Chamberlin Glacier
- Chernomen Glacier
- Chernoochene Glacier
- Chuchuliga Glacier
- Clarke Glacier
- Clarke Glacier (Graham Land)
- Comrie Glacier
- Crane Glacier
- Cronus Glacier
- Cumpston Glacier
- Dabrava Glacier
- Daguerre Glacier
- Darvari Glacier
- Daspit Glacier
- Demorest Glacier
- Desudava Glacier
- Deville Glacier
- Dinsmoor Glacier
- Dolie Glacier
- Doyle Glacier
- Drummond Glacier
- Drygalski Glacier
- Dzhebel Glacier
- Earnshaw Glacier
- Eden Glacier
- Edgeworth Glacier
- Eliason Glacier
- Elovdol Glacier
- Enravota Glacier
- Erden Glacier
- Erskine Glacier
- Evans Glacier
- Field Glacier
- Finsterwalder Glacier
- Flask Glacier
- Fleece Glacier
- Flint Glacier
- Forbes Glacier
- Forel Glacier
- Franca Glacier
- Fricker Glacier
- Friederichsen Glacier
- Funk Glacier
- Gibbs Glacier
- Goodwin Glacier
- Gould Glacier
- Green Glacier
- Gregory Glacier
- Grimley Glacier
- Grubb Glacier
- Haefeli Glacier
- Hamblin Glacier
- Hariot Glacier
- Heim Glacier
- Hektoria Glacier
- Henryk Glacier
- Henson Glacier
- Hermes Glacier
- Hess Glacier
- Hoek Glacier
- Hopkins Glacier
- Hotine Glacier
- Hugi Glacier
- Ice Gate Glacier
- Ice Gate Glacier
- Jorum Glacier
- Kasabova Glacier
- Kashin Glacier
- Kladorub Glacier
- Klebelsberg Glacier
- Kokora Glacier
- Kolosh Glacier
- Kom Glacier
- Koriten Glacier
- Krapets Glacier
- Krebs Glacier
- Kutlovitsa Glacier
- Lammers Glacier
- Lawrie Glacier
- Leay Glacier
- Leonardo Glacier
- Leppard Glacier
- Lesicheri Glacier
- Lever Glacier
- Lewis Glacier
- Lilienthal Glacier
- Lind Glacier
- Lliboutry Glacier
- Luke Glacier
- McCance Glacier
- McClary Glacier
- McMorrin Glacier
- McNeile Glacier
- Maitland Glacier
- Mapple Glacier
- Martin Glacier
- Marvodol Glacier
- Matthes Glacier
- Melville Glacier
- Meridian Glacier
- Miethe Glacier
- Minzuhar Glacier
- Mitterling Glacier
- Moider Glacier
- Montgolfier Glacier
- Morrison Glacier
- Moser Glacier
- Mouillard Glacier
- Muldava Glacier
- Murphy Glacier
- Musina Glacier
- Nadjakov Glacier
- Narezne Glacier
- Nemo Glacier
- Neny Glacier
- Nesla Glacier
- Niépce Glacier
- Nobile Glacier
- Northeast Glacier
- Nye Glacier
- Otlet Glacier
- Pan Glacier
- Paspal Glacier
- Pequod Glacier
- Perutz Glacier
- Peyna Glacier
- Pirin Glacier
- Poduene Glacier
- Polaris Glacier
- Pollard Glacier
- Punchbowl Glacier
- Pyke Glacier
- Quartermain Glacier
- Rachel Glacier
- Remus Glacier
- Renard Glacier
- Renaud Glacier
- Rickmers Glacier
- Risimina Glacier
- Robillard Glacier
- Rogosh Glacier
- Romulus Glacier
- Rozier Glacier
- Rudolph Glacier
- Rusalka Glacier
- Sabine Glacier
- Samodiva Glacier
- Saussure Glacier
- Sayce Glacier
- Seller Glacier
- Sharp Glacier
- Shoesmith Glacier
- Sikorsky Glacier
- Sinion Glacier
- Sirocco Glacier
- Škorpil Glacier
- Sleipnir Glacier
- Snowshoe Glacier
- Sohm Glacier
- Sölch Glacier
- Solun Glacier
- Somers Glacier
- Somigliana Glacier
- Starbuck Glacier
- Stob Glacier
- Stringfellow Glacier
- Stubb Glacier
- Suárez Glacier
- Sumner Glacier
- Swithinbank Glacier
- Swithinbank Glacier
- Talev Glacier
- Temple Glacier
- Todd Glacier
- Tofani Glacier
- Traffic Circle
- Trepetlika Glacier
- Trooz Glacier
- Vallot Glacier
- Veselie Glacier
- Vidbol Glacier
- Vivallos Glacier
- Vogel Glacier
- Vrachesh Glacier
- Wallend Glacier
- Weir Glacier
- Wellman Glacier
- Weyerhaeuser Glacier
- Wheatstone Glacier
- Whirlwind Glaciers
- Widdowson Glacier
- Wiggins Glacier
- Wilkinson Glacier
- Woodbury Glacier
- Wyatt Glacier
- Zaychar Glacier
- Zimzelen Glacier
- Zlokuchene Glacier

== Palmer Archipelago ==
- Altimir Glacier
- Balanstra Glacier
- Burevestnik Glacier
- Channel Glacier
- Chumerna Glacier
- Dimkov Glacier
- Djerassi Glacier
- Dodelen Glacier
- Gorichane Glacier
- Grigorov Glacier
- Harbour Glacier
- Hippocrates Glacier
- Hooper Glacier
- Iliad Glacier
- Jenner Glacier
- Kleptuza Glacier
- Koch Glacier
- Laënnec Glacier
- Lipen Glacier
- Lister Glacier
- Mackenzie Glacier
- Malpighi Glacier
- Mitev Glacier
- Müller Glacier
- Olstad Glacier
- Oshane Glacier
- Palilula Glacier
- Pare Glacier
- Pastra Glacier
- Pirogov Glacier
- Pleystor Glacier
- Podayva Glacier
- Ralitsa Glacier
- Rhesus Glacier
- Rush Glacier
- Shterna Glacier
- Sigmen Glacier
- Svetovrachene Glacier
- Thamyris Glacier
- Thunder Glacier
- William Glacier
- Zbelsurd Glacier
- Zlatiya Glacier

== Trinity Peninsula ==
- Aitkenhead Glacier
- Arena Glacier
- Boydell Glacier
- Depot Glacier
- Diplock Glacier
- Dreatin Glacier
- Kenney Glacier
- Malorad Glacier
- Marla Glacier
- Mondor Glacier
- Ogoya Glacier
- Pettus Glacier
- Russell East Glacier
- Russell West Glacier
- Sestrimo Glacier
- Sjogren Glacier
- Victory Glacier
- Whitecloud Glacier
- Zavera Snowfield
