= Back Cirque =

East-facing cirque

Back Cirque (67°39′S 68°28′W) is an east-facing cirque to the north of Sloman Glacier in southeast Adelaide Island, off the Antarctic Peninsula.

The cirque indents the south side of the ridge that extends from the southeast part of Mount Liotard.

It was named by the UK Antarctic Place-Names Committee in 1982 after Eric K.P. Back of the British Antarctic Survey (BAS) who, in addition to service at Adelaide Station and Grytviken from 1964–65, also served as BAS Base Commander at Signy Research Station 1974–75, Halley Research Station 1975–76, Faraday Research Station 1977–78, and Rothera Research Station in 1978–79.
