= Mitterling =

Mitterling may refer to:

- Mitterling Glacier, glacier on the east coast of Graham Land, Antarctica
- Ralph Mitterling (1890-1956), American football, basketball, and baseball player and coach
