= Tofani =

Tofani is a surname. Notable people with the surname include:

- Dave Tofani, American saxophonist, woodwind player and composer
- Loretta Tofani (born 1953), American journalist

== See also ==
- Tofani Glacier
