= Whirlwind Inlet =

Inlet on the coast of Graham Land, Antarctica

Whirlwind Inlet (67°30′S 65°25′W) is an ice-filled inlet that recedes inland for 7 nautical miles (13 km) and is 12 nautical miles (22 km) wide at its entrance between Cape Northrop and Tent Nunatak, along the east coast of Graham Land. Sir Hubert Wilkins discovered the inlet on his flight of 20 December 1928. Wilkins reported four large glaciers flowing into the inlet, which he named Whirlwind Glaciers because their relative position was suggestive of the radial cylinders of his Wright Whirlwind engine. The inlet was photographed from the air by the United States Antarctic Service (USAS) in 1940 and charted by the Falkland Islands Dependencies Survey (FIDS) in 1947.
