= Matthes Glacier =

Glacier in Antarctica

Coordinates: 67°30′S 65°40′W

Matthes Glacier is a glacier 9 nautical miles (17 km) long, flowing east into Whirlwind Inlet between Demorest Glacier and Chamberlin Glacier, on the east coast of Graham Land, Antarctica. It was discovered by Sir Hubert Wilkins on a flight of 20 December 1928, and photographed from the air by the United States Antarctic Service in 1940. It was charted by the Falkland Islands Dependencies Survey in 1947 and named for François E. Matthes, then chief geologist with the U.S. Geological Survey.

== See also ==
- Werenskiold Bastion
