= Mount Liotard =

Mountain in Graham Land, Antarctica

Mount Liotard (67°37′S 68°34′W) is a mountain having a conspicuous ice-covered peak, 2,225 metres (7,300 ft) high, standing midway between Mount Gaudry and Mount Ditte in the south part of Adelaide Island, Antarctica. It was discovered and first surveyed by the Fourth French Antarctic Expedition in 1909. It was resurveyed in 1948 by the Falkland Islands Dependencies Survey (FIDS) and named by the UK Antarctic Place-Names Committee for Andre F. Liotard, a French observer with the FIDS in 1947–48 and the leader of the French Antarctic Expedition, 1949–51.
