= Pollard Glacier =

Glacier in Antarctica

Pollard Glacier (65°49′S 64°13′W) is a glacier flowing into the south side of Comrie Glacier to the east of Bradford Glacier, on the west coast of Graham Land. Mapped by the Falkland Islands Dependencies Survey (FIDS) from photos taken by Hunting Aerosurveys Ltd. in 1956–57. Named by the United Kingdom Antarctic Place-Names Committee (UK-APC) for Alan F.C. Pollard (1877–1948), English documentalist, founder and first president of the British Society for International Bibliography, and pioneer in the introduction of the Universal Decimal Classification into British libraries.
