= Flint Glacier =

Glacier in Antarctica

Flint Glacier (67°20′S 65°25′W) is a glacier which flows south into Whirlwind Inlet between Demorest Glacier and Cape Northrop, on the east coast of Graham Land, Antarctica. It was discovered by Sir Hubert Wilkins on his flight of December 20, 1928, and photographed from the air by the United States Antarctic Service in 1940. It was charted in 1947 by the Falkland Islands Dependencies Survey, who named it for glaciologist Richard F. Flint, professor of geology at Yale University.
