= Renaud Glacier =

Glacier in Antarctica

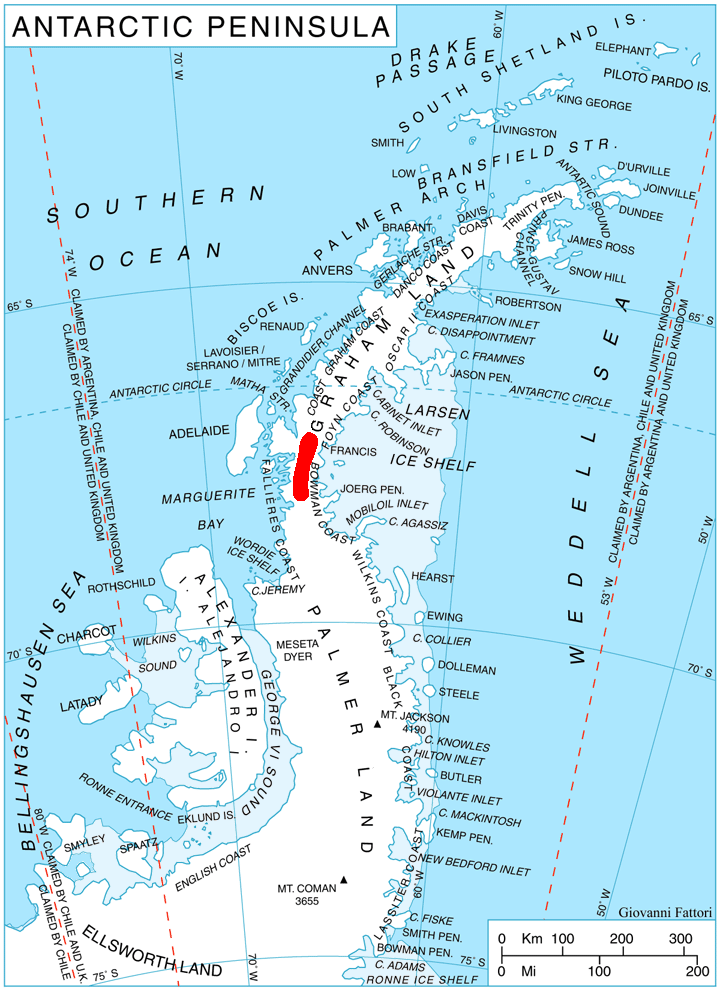
Location of Hemimont Plateau on the Antarctic Peninsula.

Renaud Glacier (67°43′S 65°35′W) is a heavily crevassed glacier on the east side of Hemimont Plateau flowing southeast to enter Seligman Inlet between Lewis Glacier and Choyce Point, on the east coast of Graham Land. The glacier was first photographed by the United States Antarctic Service (USAS), 1939–41. Named by United Kingdom Antarctic Place-Names Committee (UK-APC) for Andre Renaud, Swiss glaciologist and chairman of the Swiss Glacier Commission, 1955–74.
