= Chamberlin Glacier =

Glacier in Antarctica

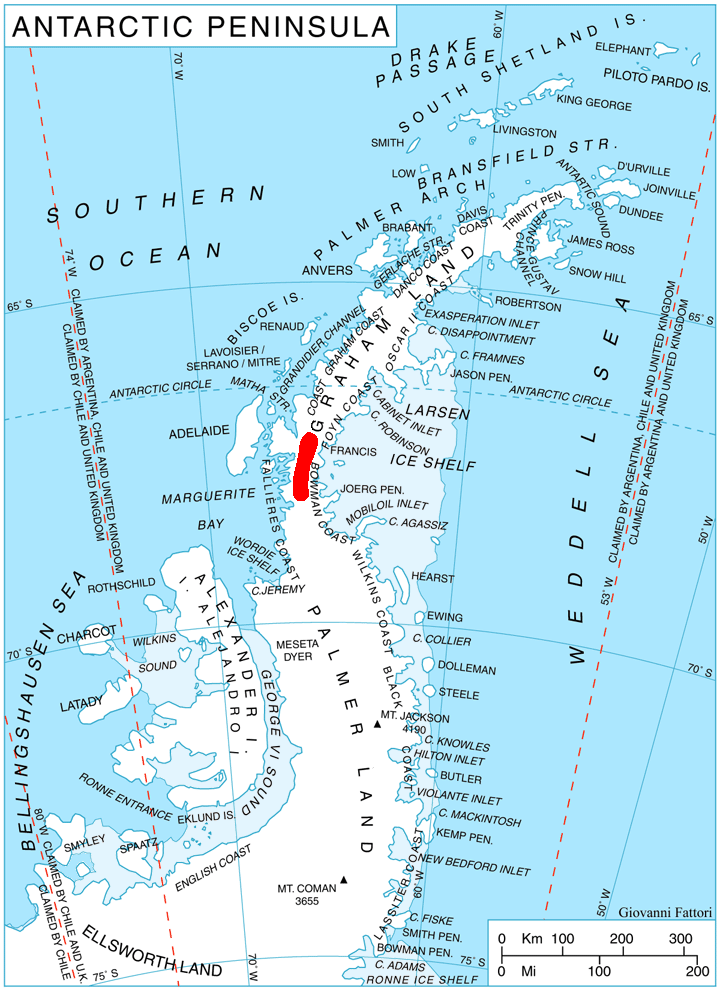
- Location of Hemimont Plateau on the Antarctic Peninsula

- Location within Antarctica
- Location: Graham Land
- Coordinates: 67°34′00″S 65°33′00″W
- Thickness: unknown
- Highest elevation: 549 m (1,801 ft)
- Terminus: Whirlwind Inlet
- Status: unknown

Chamberlin Glacier (67°34′S 65°33′W) is a glacier on the east side of Hemimont Plateau which flows northeast into Whirlwind Inlet about 4 nautical miles (7 km) southeast of Matthes Glacier, on the east coast of Graham Land.

== History ==
Chamberlin Glacier was discovered by Sir Hubert Wilkins on a flight of December 20, 1928, and in 1940 was photographed from the air by the United States Antarctic Service. It was charted in 1947 by the Falkland Islands Dependencies Survey, who named it for American glaciologist and geomorphologist Thomas C. Chamberlin, educator and professor of geology at the Universities of Wisconsin and Chicago.

== See also ==
- List of glaciers in the Antarctic
- Glaciology
