= Alberts Glacier =

Glacier in Antarctica

- Location within Antarctica
- Type: heavily crevassed
- Location: Graham Land
- Coordinates: 66°52′S 64°53′W
- Length: 7 nmi (13 km; 8 mi)
- Thickness: unknown
- Highest elevation: 155 m (509 ft)
- Terminus: Mill Inlet
- Status: unknown

Alberts Glacier (66°52′S 64°53′W) is a heavily crevassed glacier in Antarctica. It is about 8 miles (13 km) long, and flows east from Avery Plateau, Graham Land, until entering Mill Inlet between Balch Glacier and Southard Promontory.

== History ==
The glacier was photographed from the air by the U.S. Navy in 1968. It was delineated from these photographs by Directorate of Overseas Surveys, 1980, and positioned from surveys by Falkland Islands Dependencies Survey, 1947–57. In association with the names of Antarctic historians around the area, it was named by United Kingdom Antarctic Place-Names Committee after Fred G. Alberts, an American toponymist, and secretary of the Advisory Committee on Antarctic Names 1949–80.

== See also ==
- List of glaciers in the Antarctic
- Glaciology
