= Hurley Glacier =

Glacier in Antarctica

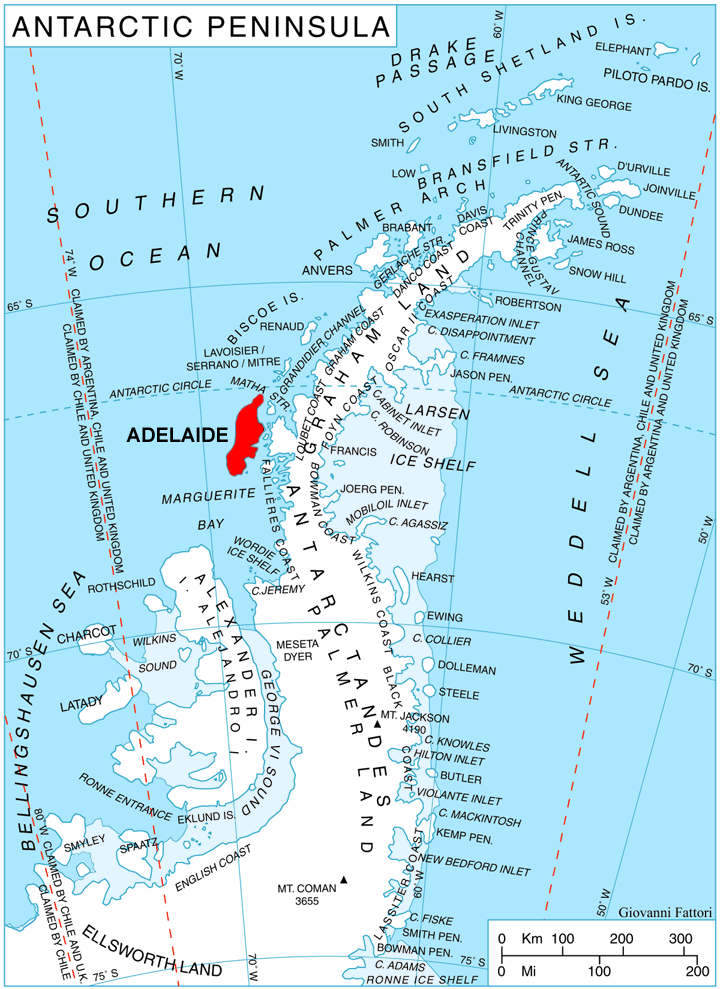
- Location of Adelaide Island in the Antarctic Peninsula

- Location within Antarctica
- Location: Adelaide Island
- Coordinates: 67°34′S 68°32′W
- Thickness: unknown
- Terminus: Ryder Bay
- Status: unknown

Hurley Glacier (67°34′S 68°32′W) is a glacier between Mount Gaudry and Mount Liotard, flowing east into Ryder Bay, Adelaide Island, Antarctica. It was named by the UK Antarctic Place-Names Committee in 1977 after Alec J. Hurley, a British Antarctic Survey mechanic at Halley Station, 1975–76, and Rothera Station, 1976–77.

== See also ==
- List of glaciers in the Antarctic
- Glaciology
