= Cumpston Glacier =

Glacier in Antarctica

Coordinates: 66°59′S 65°2′W

Cumpston Glacier is a small glacier on the east coast of Graham Land, draining between Breitfuss Glacier and Quartermain Glacier into the head of Mill Inlet. It was named by the UK Antarctic Place-Names Committee for J.S. Cumpston, an Australian historian of the Antarctic.
