= Morrison Glacier =

Glacier in Antarctica

Morrison Glacier (66°10′S 63°30′W) is a glacier 3 nautical miles (6 km) long between Attlee Glacier and Eden Glacier, flowing south to the head of Cabinet Inlet, on the east coast of Graham Land, Antarctica. It was charted in 1947 by the Falkland Islands Dependencies Survey, who named it for Rt. Hon. Herbert Morrison, M.P., British Home Secretary and member of the War Cabinet. It was photographed from the air during 1947 by the Ronne Antarctic Research Expedition under Finn Ronne.
