= Antevs Glacier =

Glacier in Graham Land, Antarctica

- North Heim Gladier
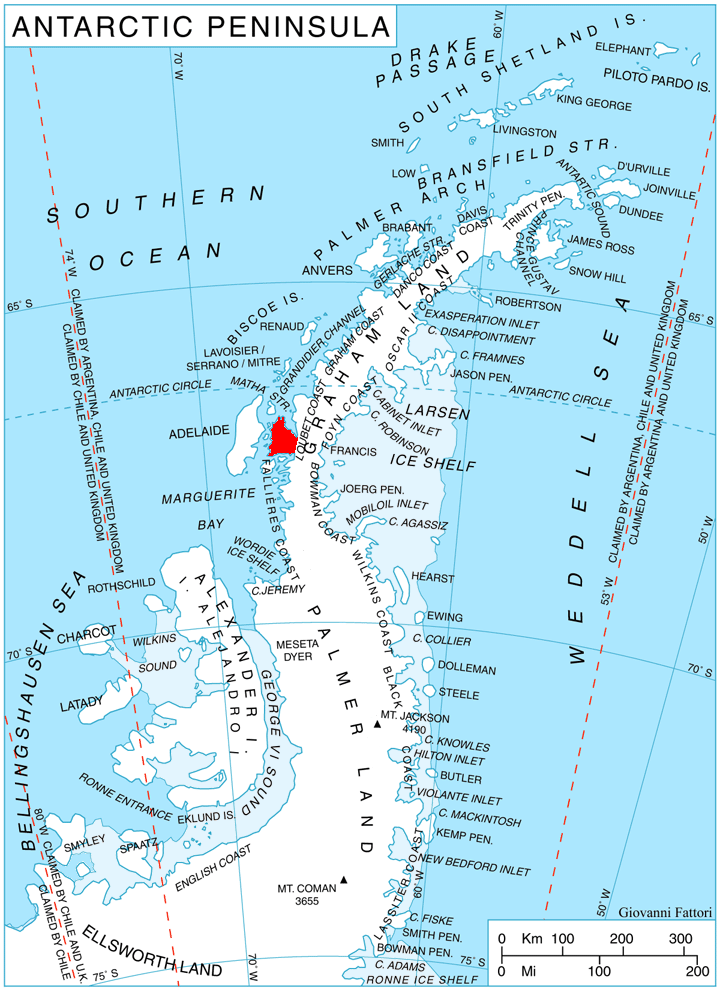
- Location of Arrowsmith Peninsula on Graham Coast, Antarctic Peninsula

- Location within Antarctica
- Location: Graham Land
- Coordinates: 67°19′S 66°49′W
- Thickness: unknown
- Highest elevation: 163 m (535 ft)
- Terminus: Muller Ice Shelf
- Status: unknown

Antevs Glacier (67°19′S 66°49′W), also known as North Heim Glacier, is a glacier on Arrowsmith Peninsula, Graham Land, flowing north between Seue Peaks and Boyle Mountains into Muller Ice Shelf, Lallemand Fjord. It was named by the United Kingdom Antarctic Place-Names Committee in 1960 after Ernst V. Antevs, American glacial geologist.

== See also ==
- Heim Glacier
- List of glaciers in the Antarctic
- Glaciology
