= Erden Glacier =

Glacier in Graham Land, Antarctica

Location of Oscar II Coast on Antarctic Peninsula.

Erden Glacier (Bulgarian: ледник Ерден, romanized: lednik Erden, IPA: [ˈlɛdnik ɛrˈdɛn]) is the 6 km long and 2.8 km wide glacier on Oscar II Coast in Graham Land situated southwest of Lesicheri Glacier. It drains the southeast slopes of Forbidden Plateau, and flows southeastwards to join Jorum Glacier. The feature is named after the settlement of Erden in Northwestern Bulgaria.

== Location ==
Erden Glacier is located at 65°10′25″S 62°24′00″W. British mapping in 1976.

== Maps ==
- British Antarctic Territory. Scale 1:200000 topographic map. DOS 610 Series, Sheet W 65 62. Directorate of Overseas Surveys, Tolworth, UK, 1976.
- Antarctic Digital Database (ADD). Scale 1:250000 topographic map of Antarctica. Scientific Committee on Antarctic Research (SCAR). Since 1993, regularly upgraded and updated.
