= Wellman Glacier =

Glacier in Graham Land, Antarctica

Wellman Glacier (64°29′S 61°26′W) is a glacier flowing into the northeast part of Recess Cove, Charlotte Bay, on the west coast of Graham Land. Charted by the Belgian Antarctic Expedition under Gerlache, 1897–99. Named by the United Kingdom Antarctic Place-Names Committee (UK-APC) in 1960 for Walter Wellman (1858–1934), American Arctic explorer who attempted unsuccessfully to reach the North Pole in a semi-rigid airship in 1907 and 1909.
