= Nemo Glacier =

Glacier in Antarctica

Nemo Glacier (67°43′S 67°22′W) is a glacier flowing east into Nemo Cove, Pourquoi Pas Island, in northeast Marguerite Bay. Named by United Kingdom Antarctic Place-Names Committee (UK-APC), 1979, in association with Nemo Cove.
