= Brückner Glacier =

Glacier in Loubet Coast, Antarctica

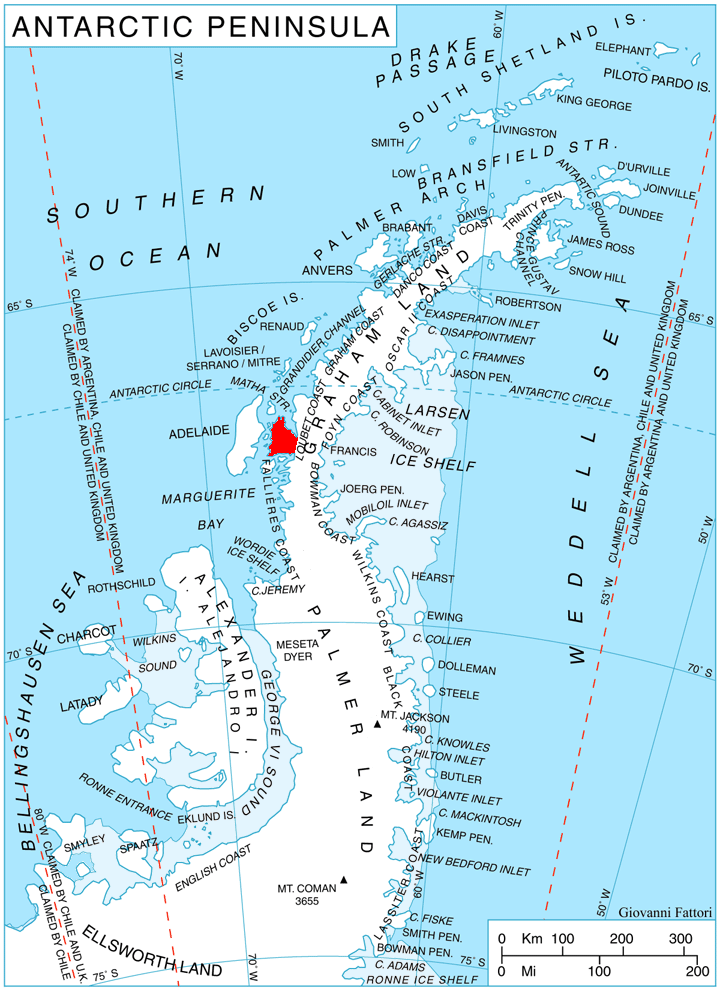
- Location of Arrowsmith Peninsula on Graham Coast, Antarctic Peninsula

- Location within Antarctica
- Location: Graham Land
- Coordinates: 67°18′00″S 67°00′00″W
- Thickness: unknown
- Highest elevation: 810 m (2,657 ft)
- Terminus: Lallemand Fjord
- Status: unknown

Brückner Glacier (67°18′S 67°0′W) is a glacier flowing northeast on Arrowsmith Peninsula to Muller Ice Shelf in the southwest part of Lallemand Fjord, Loubet Coast. It was mapped by the Falkland Islands Dependencies Survey from surveys and air photos, 1956–59, and named by the UK Antarctic Place-Names Committee after Eduard Brückner, German pioneer glaciologist.

== See also ==
- List of glaciers in the Antarctic
- Glaciology
