= Thunder Glacier (Antarctica) =

Glacier in Antarctica

- Location within Antarctica
- Location: Palmer Archipelago
- Coordinates: 64°50′S 63°24′W
- Length: 4 nmi (7 km; 5 mi)
- Thickness: unknown
- Status: unknown

Thunder Glacier (64°50′S 63°24′W) is a through glacier, 4 nautical miles (7 km) long, which extends in an east–west direction across Wiencke Island between Sierra DuFief and the Wall Range, in the Palmer Archipelago. It has probably been known of since the discovery of Wiencke Island by the Belgian Antarctic Expedition in 1898. It was charted in 1944 by the Falkland Islands Dependencies Survey (FIDS), and so named by them because a survey party was nearly overwhelmed there by an avalanche.

== See also ==
- List of glaciers in the Antarctic
- Glaciology
