= Krebs Glacier =

Glacier in Antarctica

Krebs Glacier (64°38′S 61°31′W) is a glacier flowing west into the head of Charlotte Bay on the west coast of Graham Land, Antarctica. It was charted by the Belgian Antarctic Expedition under Gerlache, 1897–99, and was named by the UK Antarctic Place-Names Committee in 1960 for Arthur Constantin Krebs, who, with Charles Renard, constructed and flew the first dirigible airship capable of steady flight under control, in 1884.
