= Hamblin Glacier =

Glacier in Antarctica

Hamblin Glacier (66°24′S 65°7′W) is a glacier flowing to the southeast side of Widmark Ice Piedmont, in Graham Land, Antarctica. It was photographed by Hunting Aerosurveys Ltd in 1955–57, and mapped from these photos by the Falkland Islands Dependencies Survey. It was named by the UK Antarctic Place-Names Committee in 1959 for Theodore Hamblin (1873–1952), an English optician who in the 1930s helped in the evolution of the first satisfactory snow goggle design.
