= Otlet Glacier =

Glacier in Graham Land, Antarctica

Otlet Glacier (65°48′S 64°38′W) is a glacier 9 nautical miles (17 km) long, flowing along the south side of Fontaine Heights to the west coast of Graham Land. Roughly charted by the British Graham Land Expedition (BGLE) under Rymill, 1934–37. More accurately mapped by the Falkland Islands Dependencies Survey (FIDS) from photos taken by Hunting Aerosurveys Ltd. in 1956–57. Named by the United Kingdom Antarctic Place-Names Committee (UK-APC) for Paul Otlet (1868–1944), Belgian documentalist, co-founder of the Institut International de Bibliographie at Brussels, 1895, and of the Universal Decimal Classification. He was a pioneer of the rational organization of polar information by an international classification scheme.
