= Horton Glacier =

Glacier in Antarctica

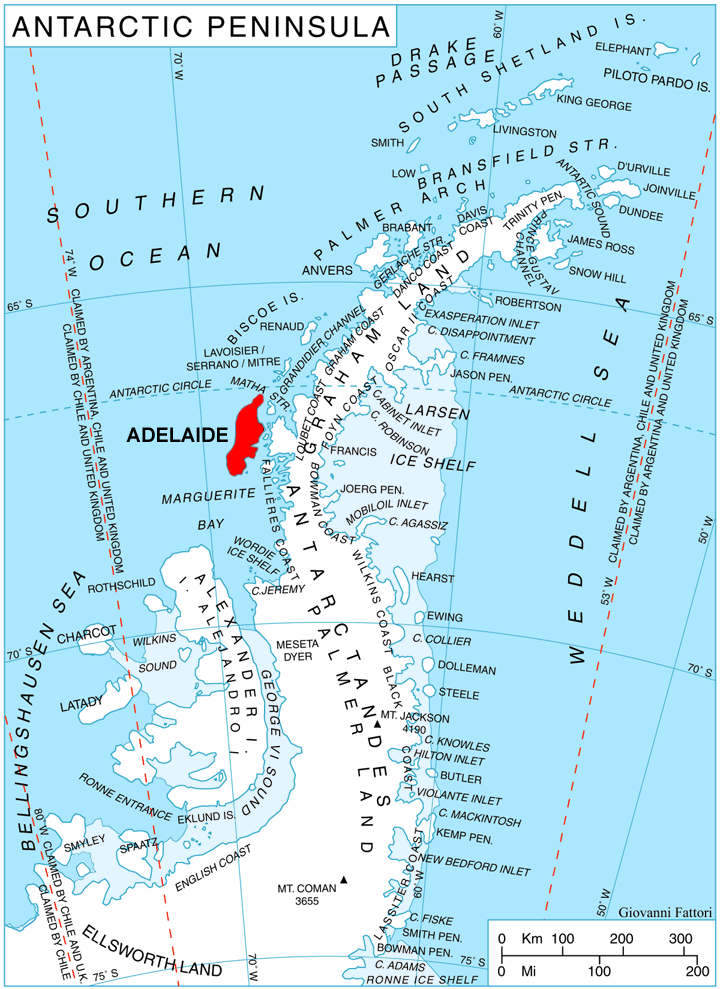
- Location of Adelaide Island in the Antarctic Peninsula

- Location within Antarctica
- Location: Adelaide Island
- Coordinates: 67°33′S 68°30′W
- Thickness: unknown
- Terminus: Ryder Bay
- Status: unknown

Horton Glacier (67°33′S 68°30′W) is a glacier at the east side of Mount Barre and Mount Gaudry, flowing southeast from Adelaide Island into Ryder Bay, Antarctica. It was named by the UK Antarctic Place-Names Committee in 1977 for Colin P. Horton, a British Antarctic Survey builder at the nearby Rothera Station, 1976–77.

== See also ==
- List of glaciers in the Antarctic
- Glaciology
