= Pastra Glacier =

Glacier in Palmer Archipelago of Antarctica

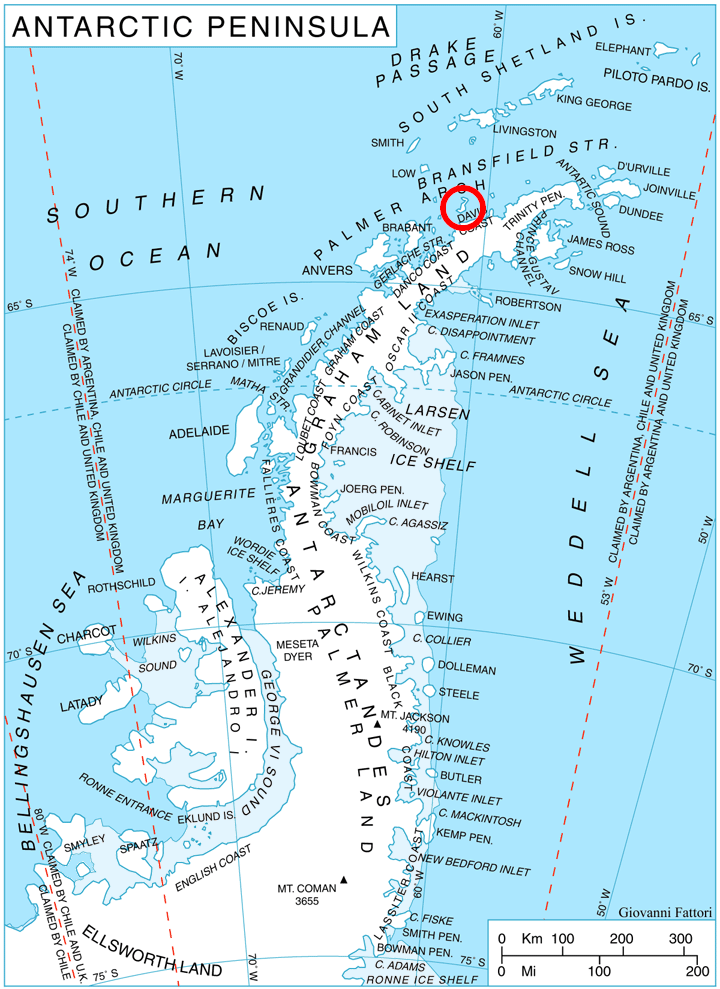
- Location of Trinity Island in the Antarctic Peninsula region

- Location within Antarctica
- Location: Palmer Archipelago
- Coordinates: 63°46′S 60°44′W
- Length: 3 nmi (6 km; 3 mi)
- Width: 1 nmi (2 km; 1 mi)
- Thickness: unknown
- Terminus: Milburn Bay
- Status: unknown

Pastra Glacier (Bulgarian: ледник Пастра, romanized: lednik Pastra, IPA: [ˈlɛdnik ˈpastrɐ]) is a 4.8 km long and 2 km wide glacier in the central part of Trinity Island in the Palmer Archipelago, Antarctica. Draining northwards to flow into Milburn Bay.

The glacier is named after the settlement of Pastra in western Bulgaria.

== Location ==
Pastra Glacier is centred at 63°46′00″S 60°44′00″W. British mapping in 1978.

== See also ==
- List of glaciers in the Antarctic
- Glaciology

== Maps ==
- British Antarctic Territory. Scale 1:200000 topographic map No. 3197. DOS 610 - W 63 60. Tolworth, UK, 1978.
- Antarctic Digital Database (ADD). Scale 1:250000 topographic map of Antarctica. Scientific Committee on Antarctic Research (SCAR). Since 1993, regularly upgraded and updated.
