= Moider Glacier =

Glacier in Graham Land, Antarctica

Moider Glacier (67°43′S 67°38′W) is a glacier flowing west into the east side of Dalgliesh Bay, Pourquoi Pas Island, in Marguerite Bay, Antarctica. It was named by the UK Antarctic Place-Names Committee in 1979 in association with nearby Perplex Ridge; the word "moider" can be a synonym for "perplex".
