= Balch Glacier =

Glacier in Antarctica

- Location within Antarctica
- Location: Graham Land
- Coordinates: 66°50′S 64°48′W
- Length: 11 nmi (20 km; 13 mi)
- Thickness: unknown
- Highest elevation: 267 m (876 ft)
- Terminus: south-east to Mill Inlet south to Gould Glacier
- Status: unknown

Balch Glacier (66°50′S 64°48′W) is a glacier 9 nautical miles (17 km) long, on the east coast of Graham Land, flowing southeast into Mill Inlet, to the south of Gould Glacier.

== History ==
It was first surveyed by the Falkland Islands Dependencies Survey in 1946–47, and named "East Balch Glacier". With "West Balch Glacier" it was reported to fill a transverse depression across Graham Land, but further survey in 1957 showed that there is no close topographical alignment between the two. The name "Balch", for Edwin S. Balch, an American Antarctic historian, has been limited to this glacier and an entirely new name, Drummond Glacier, approved for the west glacier.

== See also ==
- List of glaciers in the Antarctic
- Glaciology
