= Lliboutry Glacier =

Glacier in Antarctica

Lliboutry Glacier (67°30′S 66°46′W) is a glacier flowing southwest from the Boyle Mountains of Antarctica into Bourgeois Fjord, Loubet Coast. It was named by the UK Antarctic Place-Names Committee in 1983 after Louis A.F. Lliboutry, a French physicist and glaciologist who investigated the mechanical deformation of ice and the micro-meteorological properties of ice surfaces, and who also made a general study of glaciers in the Antarctic Peninsula. Lliboutry was Director of the Laboratory of Glaciology, University of Grenoble, 1958–83, and President of the International Commission on Snow and Ice, 1983–87.
