= Birley Glacier =

Glacier in Antarctica

Bilrley Glacier
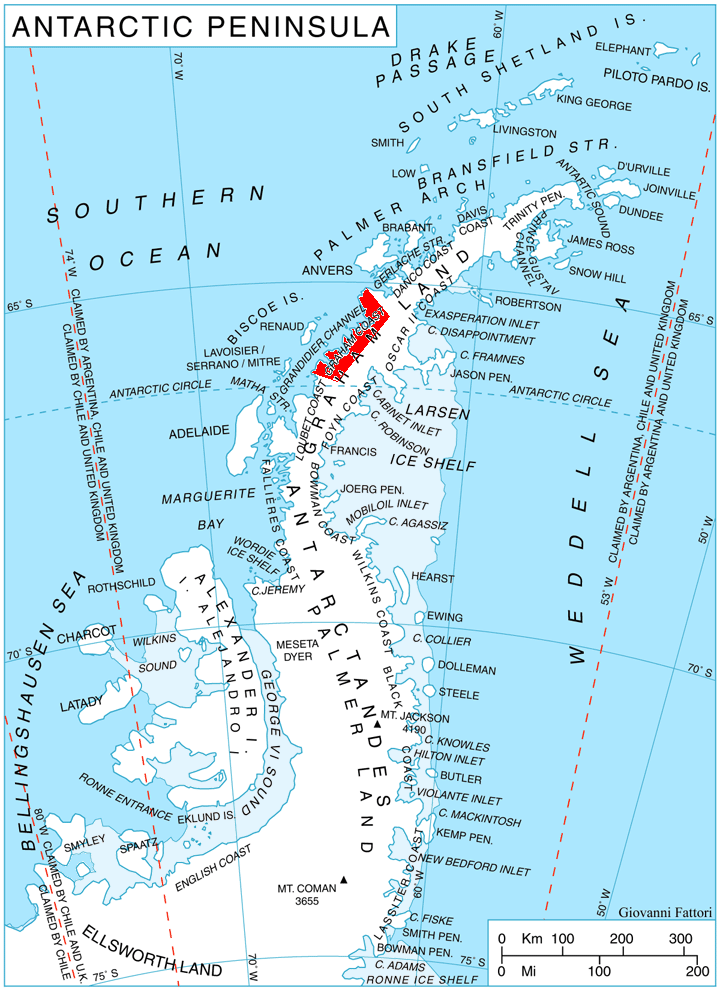
- Location of Graham Coast on the Antarctic Peninsula

- Location within Antarctica
- Location: Graham Land
- Coordinates: 65°58′00″S 64°21′00″W
- Length: 10 nmi (19 km; 12 mi)
- Thickness: unknown
- Highest elevation: 1,621 m (5,318 ft)
- Terminus: Barilari Bay
- Status: unknown

Birley Glacier (65°58′S 64°21′W) is a glacier, at least 10 nautical miles (19 km) long, flowing west into the eastern extremity of Barilari Bay north of Vardun Point, on the west coast of Graham Land. First seen and roughly surveyed in 1909 by the French Antarctic Expedition under Jean-Baptiste Charcot, it was re-surveyed in 1935–36 by the British Graham Land Expedition (BGLE) under John Rymill, and later named for Kenneth P. Birley, who contributed toward the cost of the BGLE, 1934–37.

== See also ==
- List of glaciers in the Antarctic
- Glaciology
