= Somigliana Glacier =

Antarctic glacier

Somigliana Glacier (67°0′S 67°9′W) is a glacier flowing north to Langmuir Cove on the north part of Arrowsmith Peninsula in Graham Land. Mapped by Falkland Islands Dependencies Survey (FIDS) from surveys and air photos, 1956–1959. Named by United Kingdom Antarctic Place-Names Committee (UK-APC) for Carlo Somigliana, Italian mathematician and physicist who originated a viscous theory of glacier flow, in 1921.
