= Whirlwind Glaciers =

Glaciers group in Antarctica

Whirlwind Glaciers (67°24′S 65°32′W) is a set of four prominent converging glaciers which flow into the west side of Whirlwind Inlet on the east coast of the Antarctic Peninsula. Discovered by Sir Hubert Wilkins on his flight of 20 December 1928, the glaciers were so named because their relative position was suggestive of the radial cylinders of his Wright Whirlwind engine. The Whirlwind Glaciers, comprising Flint, Demorest, Matthes, and Chamberlin Glaciers, were photographed from the air by the United States Antarctic Service (USAS) in 1940; charted by the Falkland Islands Dependencies Survey (FIDS) in 1948.
