= Doyle Glacier =

Glacier in Graham Land, Antarctica

Doyle Glacier (66°0′S 65°18′W) is a glacier flowing to the west coast of Graham Land on both sides of Prospect Point. It was charted by the British Graham Land Expedition under John Rymill, 1934–37, and was named by the UK Antarctic Place-Names Committee in 1959 for Sir Arthur Conan Doyle, the first Englishman to make a full day's journey on skis, in March 1893.
