= Miethe Glacier =

Glacier in Antarctica

Miethe Glacier (64°56′S 63°6′W) is a glacier 3 nautical miles (6 km) long, flowing northwest into Gerlache Strait to the south of Mount Banck, on the west coast of Graham Land, Antarctica. The glacier appears on an Argentine government chart of 1952. It was named by the UK Antarctic Place-Names Committee in 1960 for Adolf Miethe, a German chemist who introduced the first panchromatic emulsion for photographic plates in 1903.

The Kershaw Peaks stand west of the main mouth of Miethe Glacier.
