= Robillard Glacier =

Glacier in Antarctica

Robillard Glacier (68°18′S 65°35′W) is a narrow glacier flowing east-northeast and entering the north side of the head of Solberg Inlet, on the east coast of Graham Land. It was discovered by members of East Base of the United States Antarctic Service (USAS), 1939–41, and was photographed from the air in 1947 by the Ronne Antarctic Research Expedition (RARE), under Ronne, and charted in 1948 by the Falkland Islands Dependencies Survey (FIDS). It was named by Ronne for Captain George Robillard, U.S. Navy, of the legal section of the Bureau of Ships, who assisted in gaining Congressional support which resulted in procuring the expedition ship.
