= Channel Glacier =

Glacier in Antarctica

- Location within Antarctica
- Location: Palmer Archipelago
- Coordinates: 64°47′S 62°19′W
- Length: 1.5 nmi (3 km; 2 mi)
- Thickness: unknown
- Status: unknown

Channel Glacier (64°47′S 63°19′W) is a through glacier, 1.5 nautical miles (3 km), extending in an east-west direction across Wiencke Island, between Nipple Peak and Wall Range, in the Palmer Archipelago. It was discovered by the Belgian Antarctic Expedition under Gerlache 1897–99. The name appears on a chart based on a 1927 survey by DI personnel on the Discovery.

== See also ==
- List of glaciers in the Antarctic
- Glaciology
