= Peyna Glacier =

Glacier in Graham Land, Antarctica

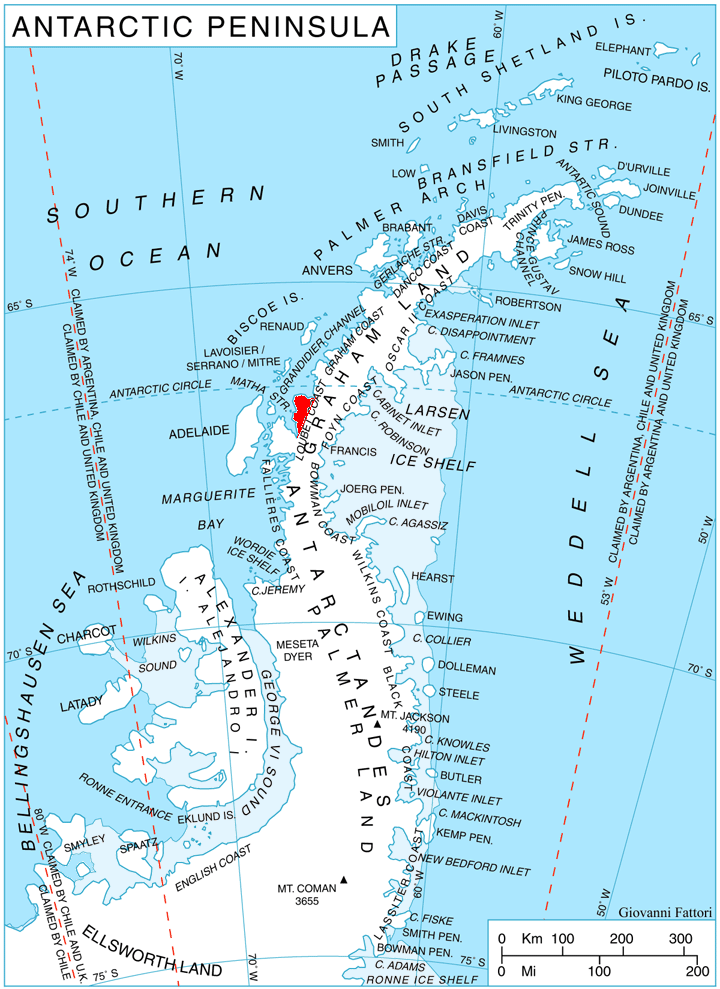
Location of Pernik Peninsula on Loubet Coast, Antarctic Peninsula.

Peyna Glacier (Bulgarian: ледник Пейна, romanized: lednik Peyna, IPA: [ˈlɛdnik ˈpɛjnɐ]) is the 11.4 km long and 3 km wide glacier on Pernik Peninsula, Loubet Coast in Graham Land, Antarctica, situated southwest of Blagun Glacier and northeast of Murphy Glacier. It flows northwestwards along Lane Ridge, and joins Murphy Glacier and Wilkinson Glacier.

The glacier is named after the settlement of Peyna in Northern Bulgaria.

== Location ==
Peyna Glacier is centred at 66°53′45″S 66°09′25″W. British mapping in 1976.

== Maps ==
- Antarctic Digital Database (ADD). Scale 1:250000 topographic map of Antarctica. Scientific Committee on Antarctic Research (SCAR). Since 1993, regularly upgraded and updated.
- British Antarctic Territory. Scale 1:200000 topographic map. DOS 610 Series, Sheet W 66 66. Directorate of Overseas Surveys, Tolworth, UK, 1976.
- Antarctic Digital Database (ADD). Scale 1:250000 topographic map of Antarctica. Scientific Committee on Antarctic Research (SCAR). Since 1993, regularly upgraded and updated.
