= Shterna Glacier =

Iceberg in Antarctica

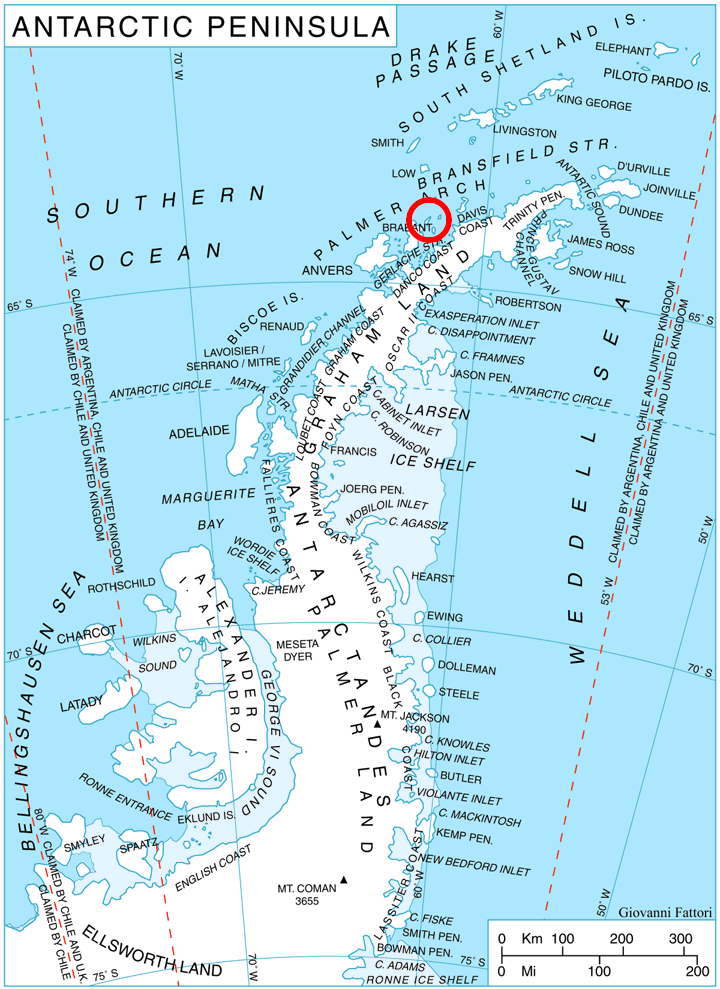
- Location of Liège Island in the Antarctic Peninsula region

- Location within Antarctica
- Location: Palmer Archipelago
- Coordinates: 63°59′45″S 61°53′10″W
- Length: 2 nmi (4 km; 2 mi)
- Width: 1 nmi (2 km; 1 mi)
- Thickness: unknown
- Terminus: Boisguehenneuc Bay
- Status: unknown

Shterna Glacier (Bulgarian: ледник Щерна, romanized: lednik Shterna, IPA: [ˈlɛdnik ˈʃtɛrnɐ]) is the glacier extending 3.6 km in east-west direction and 2.2 km in north-south direction on Liège Island in the Palmer Archipelago, Antarctica. It is situated northeast of Sigmen Glacier, draining the north slopes of Brugmann Mountains and flowing northwards into Boisguehenneuc Bay.

The glacier is named after the settlement of Shterna in Southern Bulgaria.

== Location ==
Shterna Glacier is centred at 63°59′45″S 61°53′10″W. British mapping in 1978.

== See also ==
- List of glaciers in the Antarctic
- Glaciology

== Maps ==
- British Antarctic Territory. Scale 1:200000 topographic map. DOS 610 Series, Sheet W 63 60. Directorate of Overseas Surveys, UK, 1978.
- British Antarctic Territory. Scale 1:200000 topographic map. DOS 610 Series, Sheet W 64 60. Directorate of Overseas Surveys, UK, 1978.
- Antarctic Digital Database (ADD). Scale 1:250000 topographic map of Antarctica. Scientific Committee on Antarctic Research (SCAR). Since 1993, regularly upgraded and updated.
