= Caulfeild Glacier =

Glacier in Antarctica

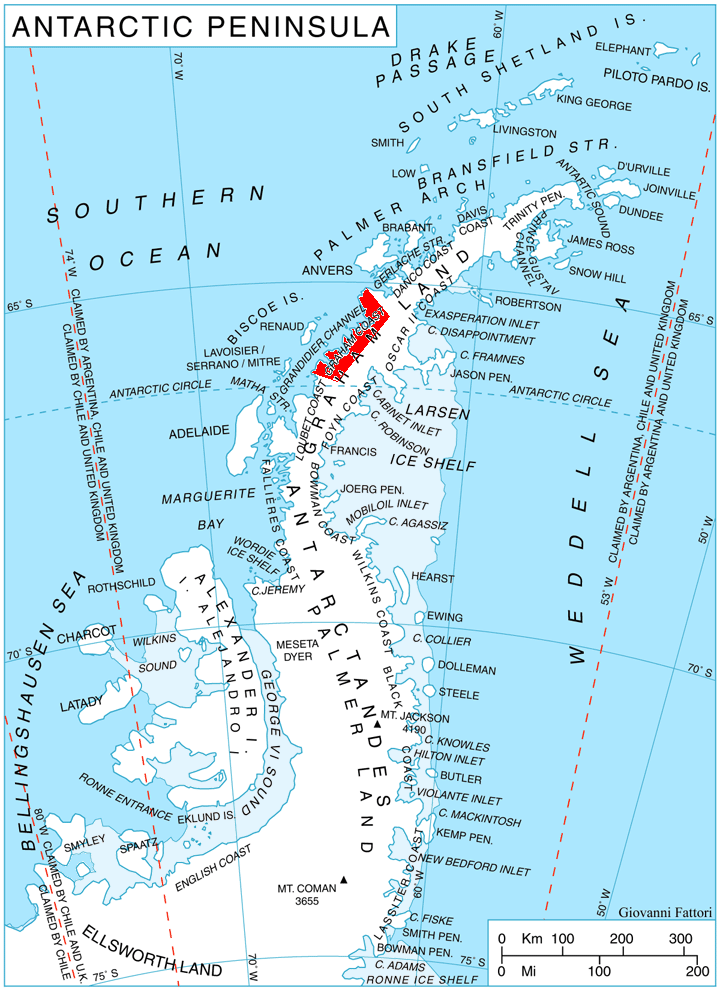
- Location of Graham Coast on the Antarctic Peninsula

- Location within Antarctica
- Location: Graham Land
- Coordinates: 66°11′00″S 65°00′00″W
- Thickness: unknown
- Highest elevation: 1,156 m (3,793 ft)
- Terminus: Hugi Glacier
- Status: unknown

Caulfeild Glacier (66°11′S 65°0′W) is the northern of two glaciers flowing into Hugi Glacier west of Dodunekov Bluff, on the west coast of Graham Land.

== History ==
Caulfeild Glacier was photographed by Hunting Aerosurveys Ltd in 1955–57 and mapped from these photos by the Falkland Islands Dependencies Survey. It was named by the UK Antarctic Place-Names Committee in 1959 for Vivian Caulfeild (1874–1958), English pioneer ski instructor, one of the greatest authorities on technique.

== See also ==
- List of glaciers in the Antarctic
- Glaciology
