= Forel Glacier =

Glacier in Graham Land, Antarctica

Forel Glacier (67°29′S 66°30′W) is a glacier 1.5 nautical miles (3 km) wide and 4 nautical miles (7 km) long, flowing southwest into Blind Bay, on the west coast of Graham Land, Antarctica. It was first roughly surveyed in 1936 by the British Graham Land Expedition under John Rymill. Its lower reaches were surveyed in 1949 by the Falkland Islands Dependencies Survey, and the glacier named by them for François-Alphonse Forel, a noted Swiss glacier physicist and author, and first President of the International Commission of Glaciers in 1894.
