= Rickmers Glacier =

Glacier in Antarctica

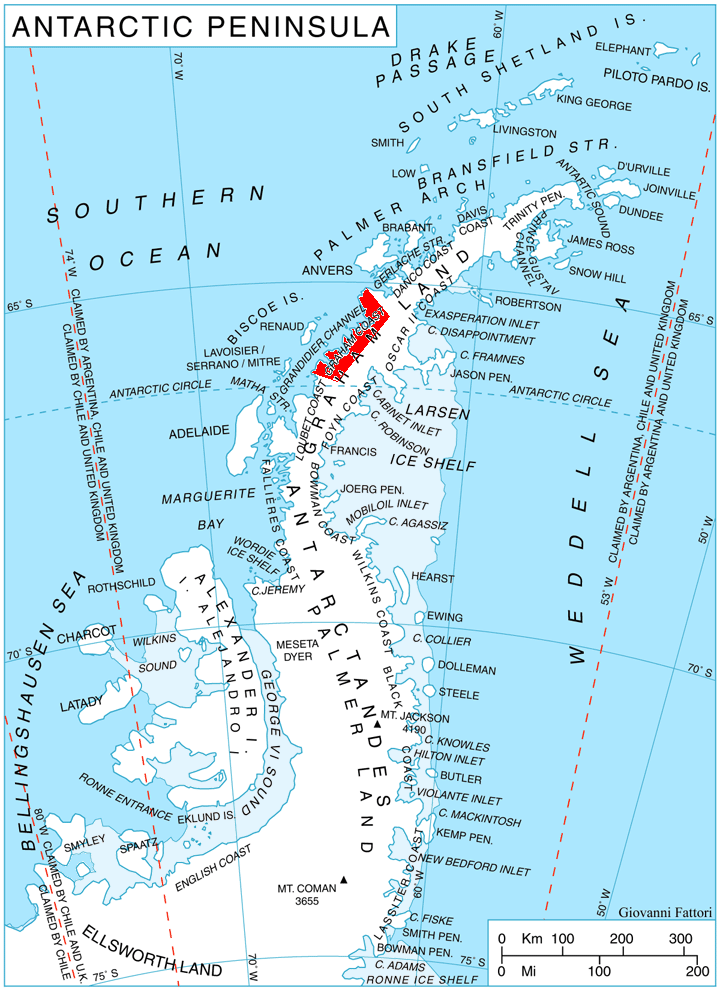
Location of Graham Coast on the Antarctic Peninsula.

Rickmers Glacier (66°15′S 64°55′W) is a glacier flowing into Hugi Glacier just northwest of Ezerets Knoll, on the west coast of Graham Land. Photographed by Hunting Aerosurveys Ltd. in 1955–57, and mapped from these photos by the Falkland Islands Dependencies Survey (FIDS). Named by the United Kingdom Antarctic Place-Names Committee (UK-APC) in 1959 for Willi Rickmer Rickmers, German pioneer exponent of skiing and joint author of the first English manual on skiing. He also improved the design of ice axes, introducing the characteristic shape still in use.
