= Dolie Glacier =

Glacier in Graham Land, Antarctica

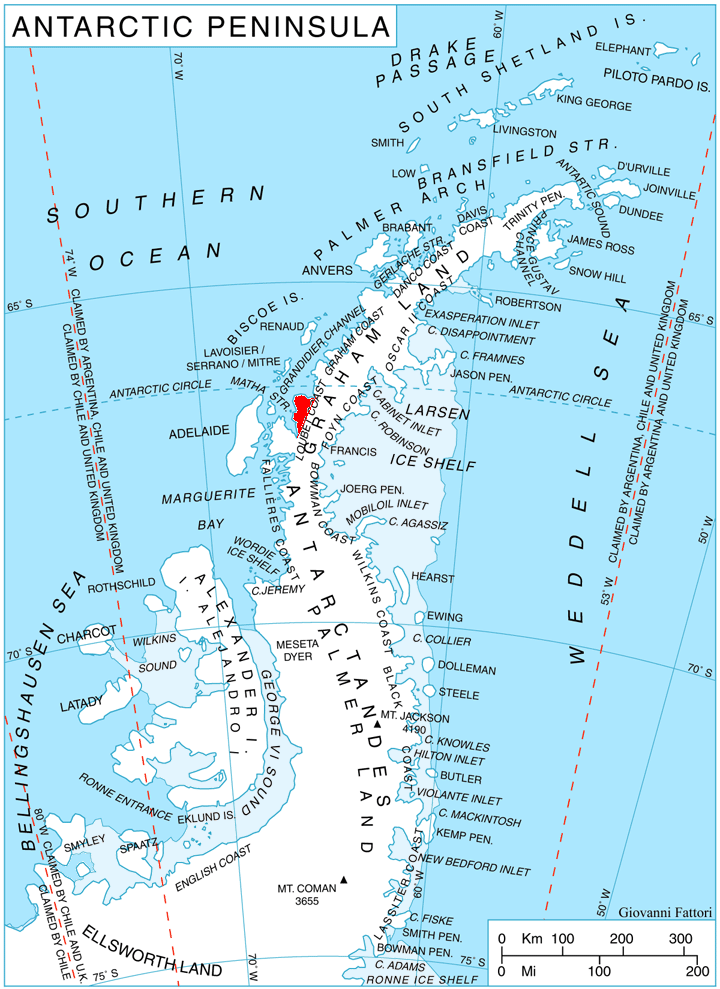
Location of Pernik Peninsula on Loubet Coast, Antarctic Peninsula.

Dolie Glacier (Bulgarian: ледник Долие, romanized: lednik Dolie, IPA: [ˈlɛdniɡ doˈliɛ]) is the 9.5 km long and 2.4 km wide glacier on Pernik Peninsula, Loubet Coast in Graham Land, Antarctica, situated southwest of McCance Glacier and northeast of Blagun Glacier. It flows northwestwards between Hodge Ridge and Liebig Peak, and joins Wilkinson Glacier.

The glacier is named after the settlement of Dolie in Southern Bulgaria.

== Location ==
Dolie Glacier is centred at 66°48′10″S 65°58′40″W. British mapping in 1976.

== Maps ==
- Antarctic Digital Database (ADD). Scale 1:250000 topographic map of Antarctica. Scientific Committee on Antarctic Research (SCAR). Since 1993, regularly upgraded and updated.
- British Antarctic Territory. Scale 1:200000 topographic map. DOS 610 Series, Sheet W 66 64. Directorate of Overseas Surveys, Tolworth, UK, 1976.
- British Antarctic Territory. Scale 1:200000 topographic map. DOS 610 Series, Sheet W 66 66. Directorate of Overseas Surveys, Tolworth, UK, 1976.
