= Wyatt Glacier =

Glacier in Graham Land on the Antarctic Peninsula

Wyatt Glacier (68°18′S 66°10′W) is a steep, narrow glacier 6 nautical miles (11 km) long in southern Graham Land. It flows south from the central plateau near Beehive Hill to join the upper part of Gibbs Glacier. Photographed from the air by Ronne Antarctic Research Expedition (RARE), November 1947. Surveyed from the ground by Falkland Islands Dependencies Survey (FIDS), May 1958. Named by United Kingdom Antarctic Place-Names Committee (UK-APC) for Henry T. Wyatt of FIDS, Medical Officer at Detaille Island, 1957, and at Stonington Island, 1958.
