= Kokora Glacier =

Glacier in Graham Land, Antarctica

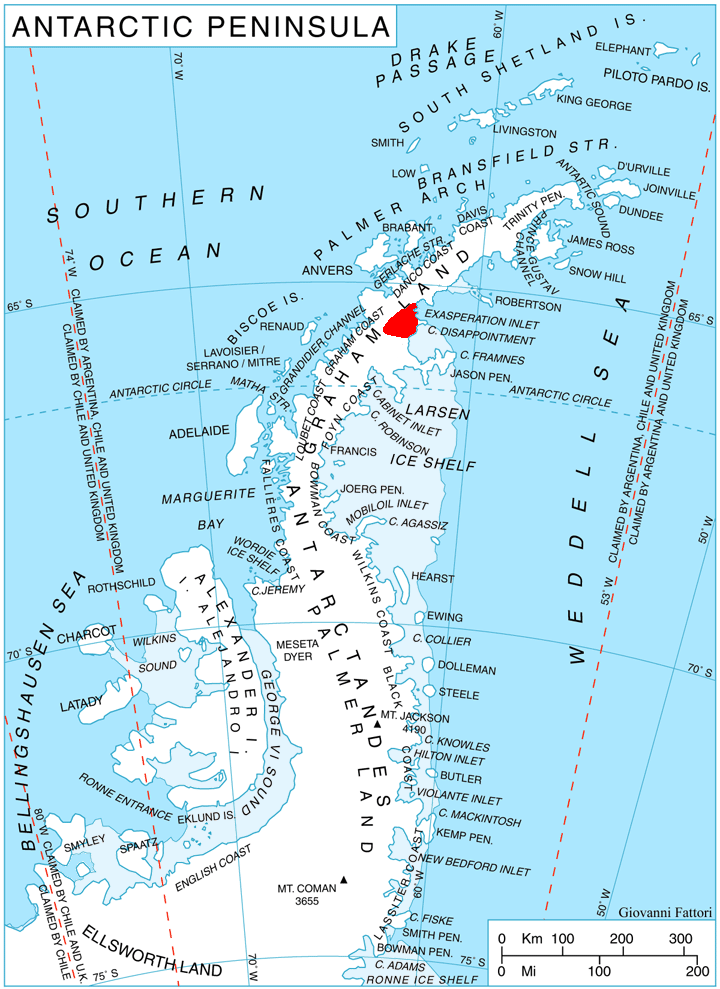
Location of Aristotle Mountains on the Antarctic Peninsula.

Kokora Glacier (Bulgarian: ледник Кокора, romanized: lednik Kokora, IPA: [ˈlɛdnik koˈkɔrɐ]) is the 13 km long and 1.5 km wide glacier in Stevrek Ridge, Aristotle Mountains on Oscar II Coast in Graham Land. It flows 11 km eastwards between two parallel branches of the ridge, then turns southeast to join Melville Glacier. Named after the settlement of Kokora in Southern Bulgaria.

== Location ==
Kokora Glacier is located at 65°26′55″S 62°25′00″W. British mapping in 1976.

== Maps ==
- British Antarctic Territory. Scale 1:200000 topographic map. DOS 610 Series, Sheet W 65 62. Directorate of Overseas Surveys, Tolworth, UK, 1976.
- Antarctic Digital Database (ADD). Scale 1:250000 topographic map of Antarctica. Scientific Committee on Antarctic Research (SCAR). Since 1993, regularly upgraded and updated.
