= Sirocco Glacier =

Glacier in Antarctica

Sirocco Glacier (69°25′S 68°31′W) is a glacier about 3 nautical miles (6 km) long flowing north-northeast into West Bay, Fallières Coast, between Brindle Cliffs and Mount Edgell. Named by the United Kingdom Antarctic Place-Names Committee (UK-APC) in 1977 after the sirocco, the Italian name for the wind that blows from the Sahara. One of several features in the area named after winds.
