= Wallend Glacier =

Glacier in Graham Land, Antarctica

Coordinates: 64°58′S 62°13′W

Wallend Glacier is a deeply entrenched glacier which drains eastward from Forbidden Plateau to join Green Glacier in northern Graham Land. Surveyed by Falkland Islands Dependencies Survey (FIDS) in 1955. So named by United Kingdom Antarctic Place-Names Committee (UK-APC) because the glacier is walled in on three sides by the escarpment of Forbidden Plateau.
