= Harbour Glacier =

Glacier in Antarctica

- Location within Antarctica
- Location: Palmer Archipelago
- Coordinates: 64°49′S 63°26′W
- Length: 3 nmi (6 km; 3 mi)
- Width: 1.5 nmi (3 km; 2 mi)
- Thickness: unknown
- Terminus: east of Noble Peak
- Status: unknown

Harbour Glacier (64°49′S 63°26′W) is a through glacier 3 nautical miles (6 km) long and 1.5 nautical miles (3 km) wide, lying on the northwest side of Wiencke Island and extending in a northeast direction from Port Lockroy to the cove 1 nautical mile (2 km) east of Noble Peak, in the Palmer Archipelago, Antarctica. It was probably first seen by the Belgian Antarctic Expedition, 1897–99, under Gerlache. The glacier was charted in 1944 by the Falkland Islands Dependencies Survey, who so named it because of its proximity to the harbour of Port Lockroy.

== See also ==
- List of glaciers in the Antarctic
- Glaciology
