= Elovdol Glacier =

Glacier in Graham Land, Antarctica

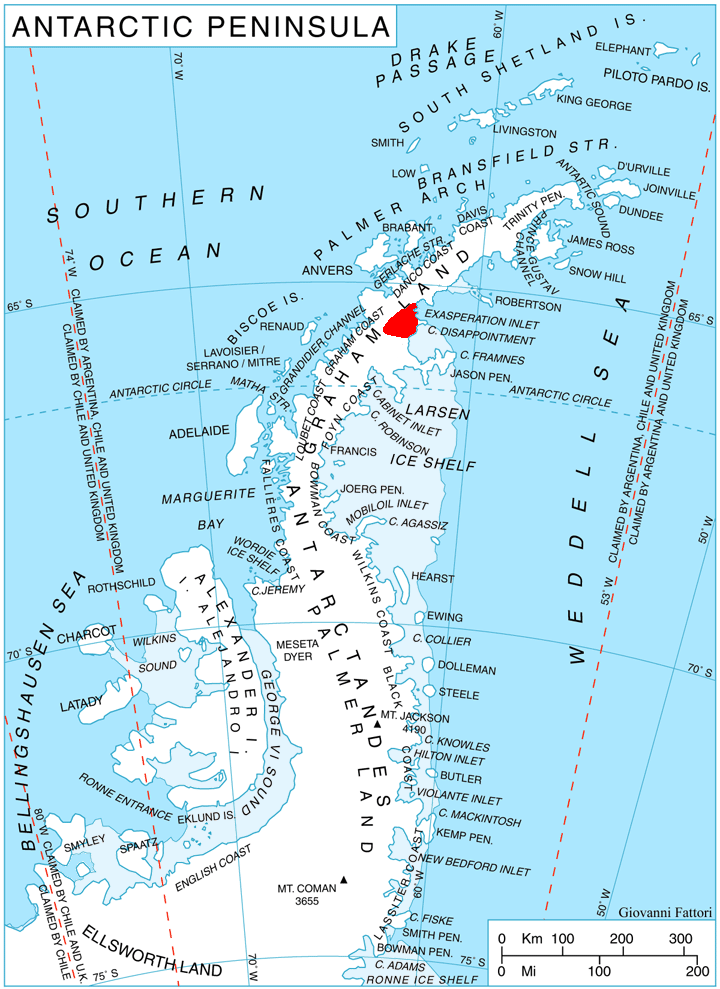
Location of Aristotle Mountains on the Antarctic Peninsula.

Elovdol Glacier (Bulgarian: ледник Еловдол, romanized: lednik Elovdol, IPA: [ˈlɛdnik ˈɛɫovdoɫ]) is the 8 km long and 3 km wide glacier in Arkovna Ridge, Aristotle Mountains on Oscar II Coast in Graham Land. It flows 6 km eastwards, then turns southeast to join Mapple Glacier. The feature is named after the settlements of Elovdol in Western Bulgaria.

== Location ==
Elovdol Glacier is located at 65°22′40″S 62°19′50″W and was mapped by British cartographers in 1976.

== Maps ==
- British Antarctic Territory. Scale 1:200000 topographic map. DOS 610 Series, Sheet W 65 62. Directorate of Overseas Surveys, Tolworth, UK, 1976.
- Antarctic Digital Database (ADD). Scale 1:250000 topographic map of Antarctica. Scientific Committee on Antarctic Research (SCAR). Since 1993, regularly upgraded and updated.
