= Barnes Glacier =

Glacier in Antarctica

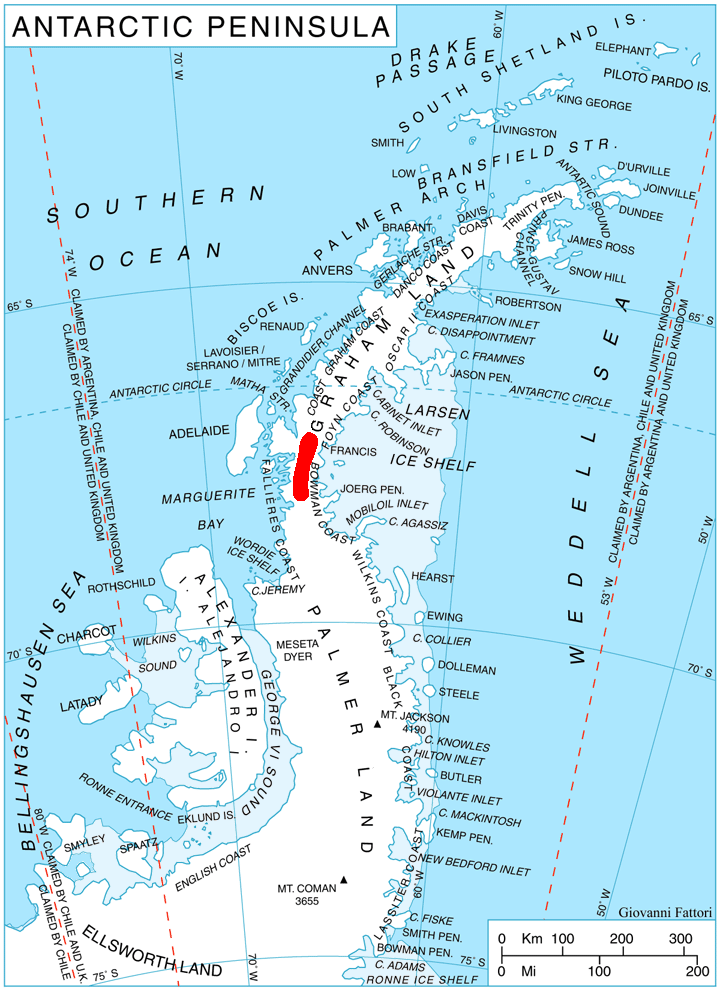
- Location of Hemimont Plateau on the Antarctic Peninsula

- Location within Antarctica
- Location: Graham Land
- Coordinates: 67°32′S 66°25′W
- Thickness: unknown
- Highest elevation: 400 m (1,312 ft)
- Terminus: Blind Bay
- Status: unknown

Barnes Glacier (67°32′S 66°25′W) is a glacier on the west side of Hemimont Plateau flowing west into Blind Bay on the west coast of Graham Land. It was named by the UK Antarctic Place-Names Committee in 1958 for Howard T. Barnes, a Canadian physicist and pioneer of ice engineering.

== See also ==
- List of glaciers in the Antarctic
- Glaciology
