= Koriten Glacier =

Glacier in Graham Land, Antarctica

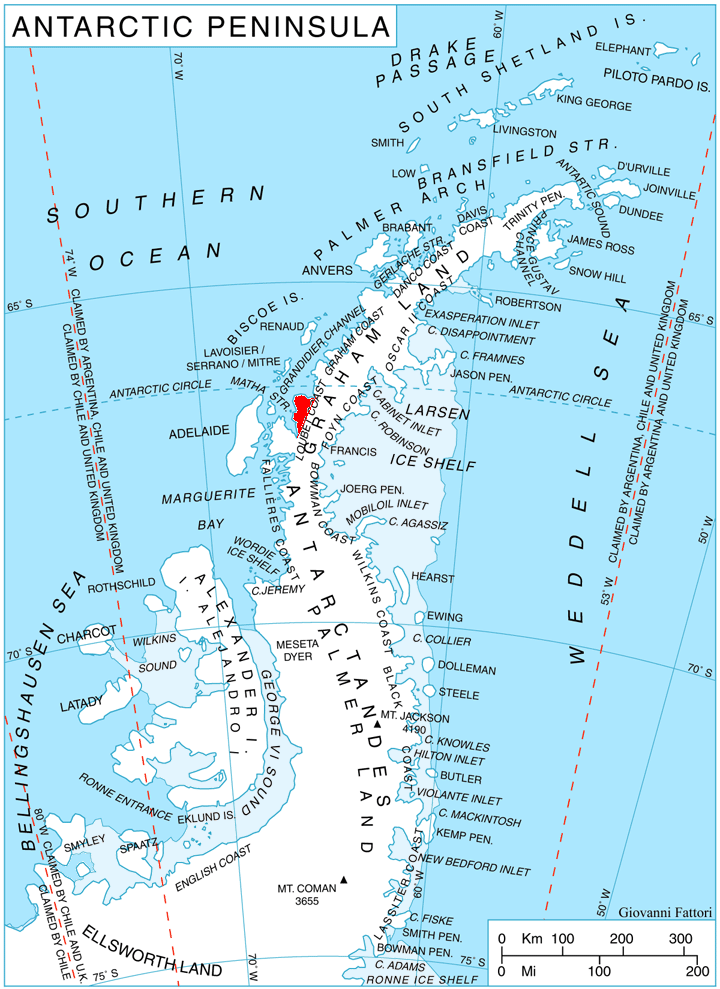
Location of Pernik Peninsula on Loubet Coast, Antarctic Peninsula.

Koriten Glacier (Bulgarian: ледник Коритен, romanized: lednik Koriten, IPA: [ˈlɛdnik koˈritɛn]) is the 5.5 km long and 1.3 km wide glacier on Pernik Peninsula, Loubet Coast in Graham Land, Antarctica, situated northwest of Wilkinson Glacier. It flows southwestwards from Protector Heights and enters the head of Chepra Cove.

The glacier is named after the settlement of Koriten in Northeastern Bulgaria.

== Location ==
Koriten Glacier is centred at 66°46′40″S 66°29′10″W. British mapping in 1976.

== Maps ==
- Antarctic Digital Database (ADD). Scale 1:250000 topographic map of Antarctica. Scientific Committee on Antarctic Research (SCAR). Since 1993, regularly upgraded and updated.
- British Antarctic Territory. Scale 1:200000 topographic map. DOS 610 Series, Sheet W 66 66. Directorate of Overseas Surveys, Tolworth, UK, 1976.
