= Hess Glacier =

Glacier in Antarctica

Hess Glacier (67°13′S 65°5′W) is a glacier approximately 5 nautical miles (9.3 km; 5.8 mi) long, flowing east-northeast between steep rock walls to its terminus, located 10 nautical miles (19 km; 12 mi) southwest of Monnier Point on the east coast of Graham Land, Antarctica. It was charted in 1947 by the Falkland Islands Dependencies Survey, which named it after Hans Hess, a German glaciologist.
