= Sheldon Glacier =

Glacier in Antarctica

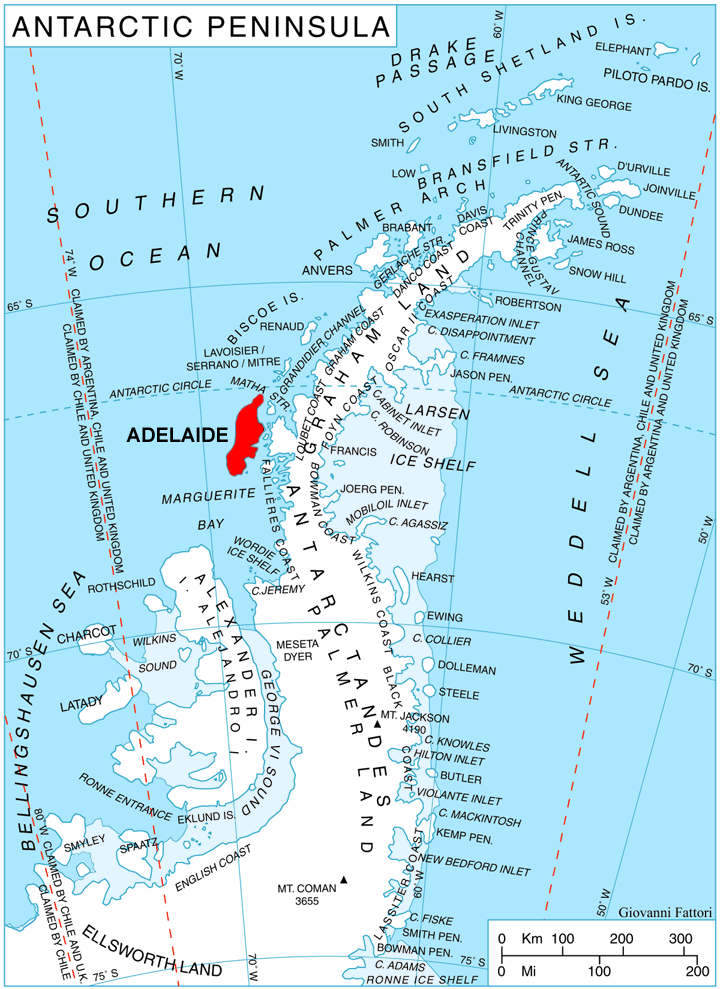
- Location of Adelaide Island in the Antarctic Peninsula

- Location within Antarctica
- Location: Adelaide Island
- Coordinates: 67°30′S 68°23′W
- Thickness: unknown
- Terminus: Ryder Bay
- Status: unknown

Sheldon Glacier (67°30′S 68°23′W) is a glacier flowing southeast from Mount Mangin into Ryder Bay, Adelaide Island, Antarctica. Named by the United Kingdom Antarctic Place-Names Committee (UK-APC) in 1977 for Ernest B. Sheldon, British Antarctic Survey (BAS) meteorological observer, Adelaide Station, 1968–69, and Stonington Island, 1969–70; Base Commander, Adelaide Station, 1975–76, and Rothera Station, 1976–77.

Prior to 1977, the glacier was called "Crumbles Glacier".

== See also ==
- List of glaciers in the Antarctic
- Glaciology
