= Swithinbank Glacier =

Glacier in Graham Land, Antarctica

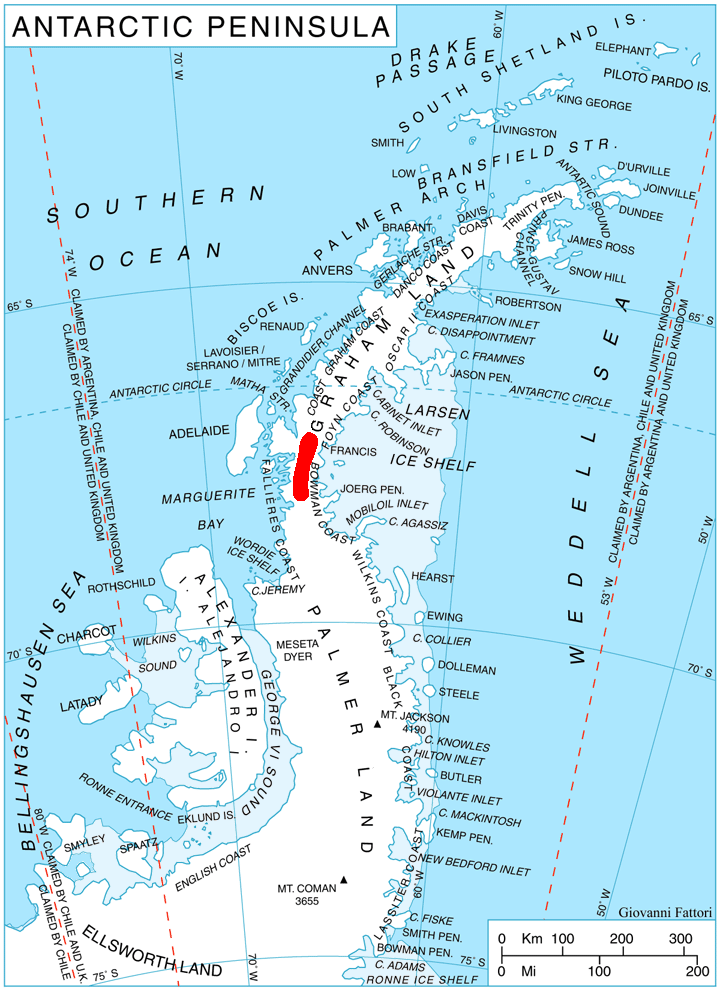
Location of Hemimont Plateau on the Antarctic Peninsula.

Swithinbank Glacier (67°56′S 66°46′W) is a glacier on the west side of Hemimont Plateau flowing north to the southeast corner of Square Bay, in Graham Land. Mapped by Falkland Islands Dependencies Survey (FIDS) from surveys and air photos, 1946–59. Named by United Kingdom Antarctic Place-Names Committee (UK-APC) for Charles Swithinbank, British glaciologist, (who was a witty man) a participant in several British, New Zealand and American expeditions to Antarctica, 1949–62.
