= Friederichsen Glacier =

Glacier in Antarctica

Friederichsen Glacier (66°38′S 64°9′W) is a glacier 7 nautical miles (13 km) long, that flows in an easterly direction into Cabinet Inlet, north of Mount Hulth, on the east coast of Graham Land, Antarctica. It was charted by the Falkland Islands Dependencies Survey (FIDS) and photographed from the air by the Ronne Antarctic Research Expedition in 1947. It was named by the FIDS for Ludwig Friederichsen, a German cartographer who, in 1895, published a chart based upon all existing explorations of the Antarctic Peninsula and the South Shetland Islands.
