= Sloman Glacier =

Glacier in Antarctica

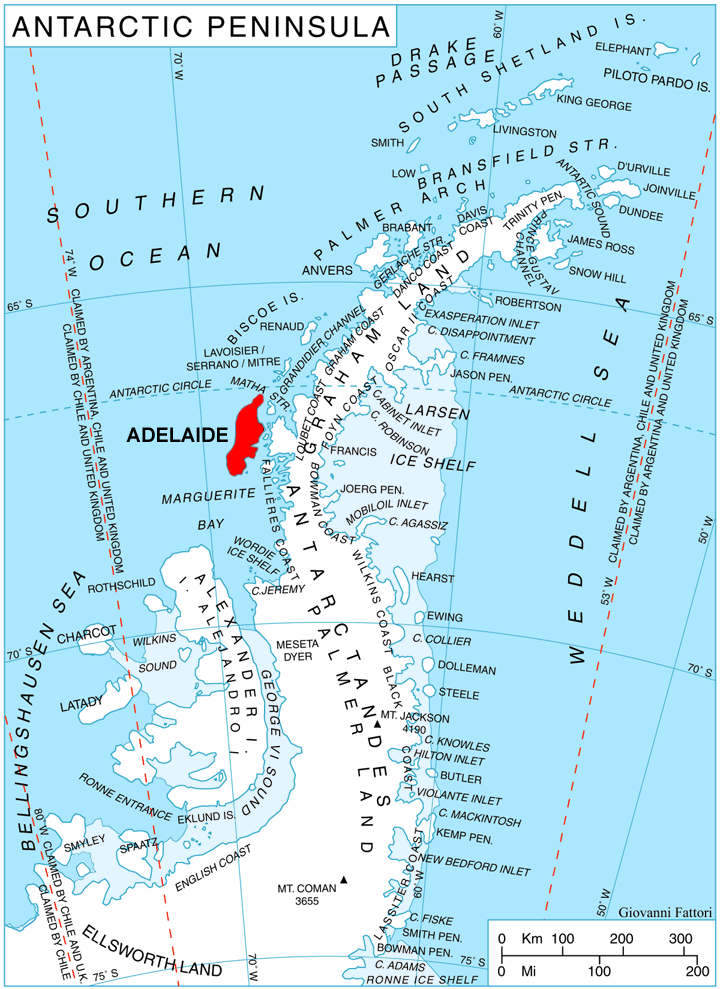
- Location of Adelaide Island in the Antarctic Peninsula

- Location within Antarctica
- Location: Adelaide Island
- Coordinates: 67°41′S 68°33′W
- Thickness: unknown
- Terminus: south east coast
- Status: unknown

Sloman Glacier (67°41′S 68°33′W) is a glacier flowing between Mount Liotard and Mount Ditte to the southeast coast of Adelaide Island. Named by the United Kingdom Antarctic Place-Names Committee (UK-APC) in 1963 for William O. Sloman, British Antarctic Survey Personnel Officer for a number of years beginning in 1956.

== See also ==
- List of glaciers in the Antarctic
- Glaciology
