= Aagaard Glacier =

Glacier in Antarctica

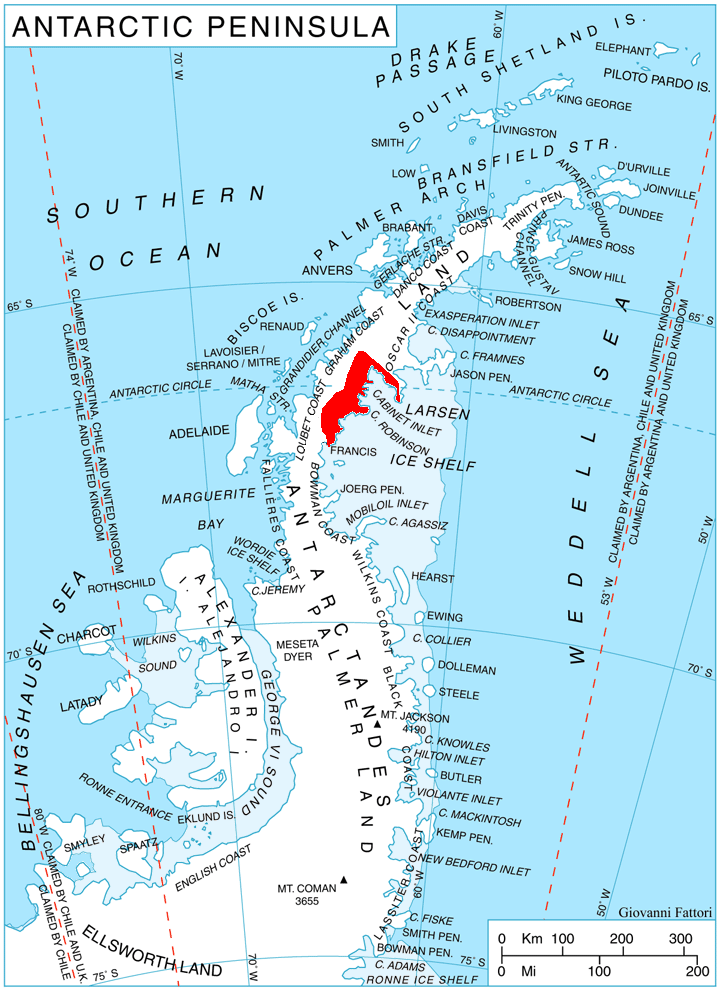
- Location of Foyn Coast on Antarctic Peninsula

- Location within Antarctic Peninsula Location within Antarctica
- Location: Graham Land; Antarctica
- Coordinates: 66°46′S 64°31′W
- Length: 8 miles (13 km)
- Thickness: unknown
- Status: unknown

Aagaard Glacier (66°46′S 64°31′W), also known as Glaciar Alderete, is an 8-mile (13 km) long Antarctic glacier which lies close to the east of Gould Glacier and flows in a southerly direction into Mill Inlet, on the east coast of Graham Land. It was charted by the Falkland Islands Dependencies Survey (FIDS) and photographed from the air by the Ronne Antarctic Research Expedition during December 1947; it was named by the FIDS for Bjarne Aagaard, a Norwegian authority on Antarctic whaling and exploration.

== See also ==
- List of glaciers in the Antarctic
- Glaciology
