= Daspit Glacier =

Glacier in Antarctica

Daspit Glacier (68°10′S 65°45′W) is a glacier 6 nautical miles (11 km) long, flowing east-northeast along the south side of Mount Shelby to the head of Trail Inlet, on the east coast of Graham Land, Antarctica. It was discovered by members of the East Base of the United States Antarctic Service, 1939–41, and was originally named Fleming Glacier after Rev. W.L.S. Fleming. It was photographed from the air in 1947 by the Ronne Antarctic Research Expedition under Finn Ronne, and charted in 1948 by the Falkland Islands Dependencies Survey. It was renamed by Ronne for Captain Lawrence R. Daspit, U.S. Navy, who assisted in obtaining Navy support for the Ronne expedition, the original name being transferred to Fleming Glacier on the Rymill Coast.
