= Heim Glacier =

Glacier in Antarctica

- Location within Antarctica
- Location: Graham Land
- Coordinates: 67°28′S 66°55′W
- Thickness: unknown
- Terminus: Lallemand Fjord
- Status: unknown

Heim Glacier is a glacier 8 nautical miles (15 km) long in the southeast part of Arrowsmith Peninsula, which flows south to merge with the ice in Jones Channel on the west coast of Graham Land, Antarctica. With Antevs Glacier to the north, it forms a transverse depression extending to the southwest part of Lallemand Fjord. Heim Glacier was first sighted from the air in 1936 by the British Graham Land Expedition under John Rymill. Its lower reaches were surveyed in 1949 by the Falkland Islands Dependencies Survey, and the glacier named by them for Albert Heim, a Swiss glaciologist and the author in 1885 of Handbuch der Gletscherkunde.
