= Lever Glacier =

Glacier in Antarctica

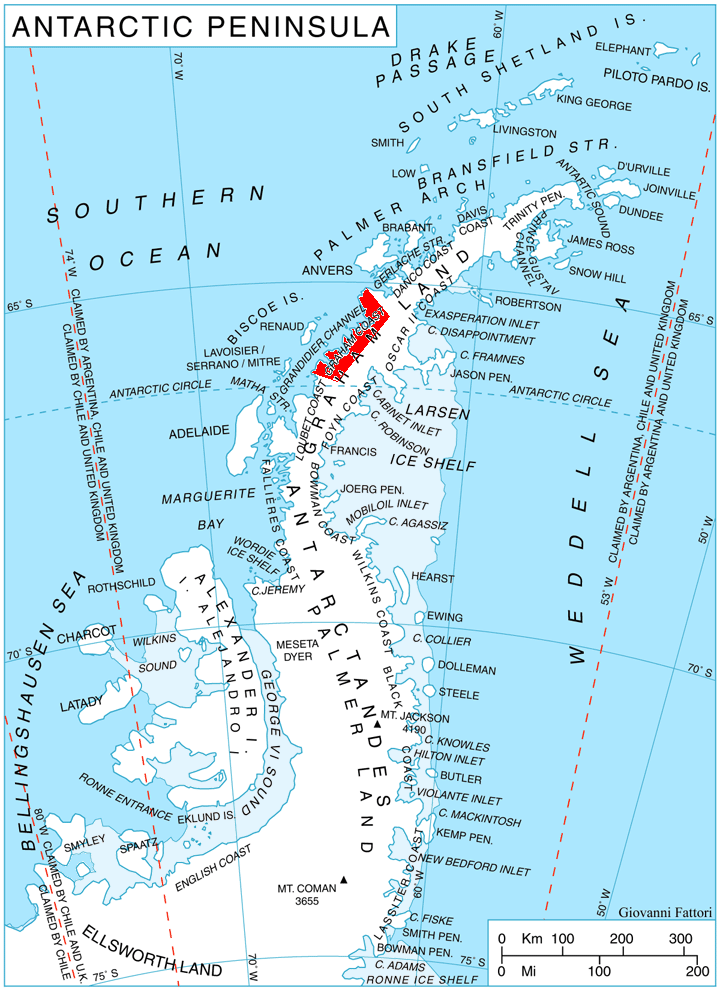
Location of Graham Coast on the Antarctic Peninsula.

Lever Glacier (65°30′S 63°40′W) is a glacier, 1.5 nautical miles (3 km) wide at its mouth and at least 6 nautical miles (11 km) long, flowing west-northwest, then west-southwest into the head of the northern arm of Beascochea Bay north of Chorul Peninsula, on the west coast of Graham Land, Antarctica. The glacier was first sighted and roughly surveyed in 1909 by the French Antarctic Expedition. It was resurveyed in 1935 by the British Graham Land Expedition (BGLE) under John Rymill, and named in 1954 for William Lever, 2nd Viscount Leverhulme, who contributed toward the cost of the BGLE.
