= Blagun Glacier =

Glacier in Antarctica

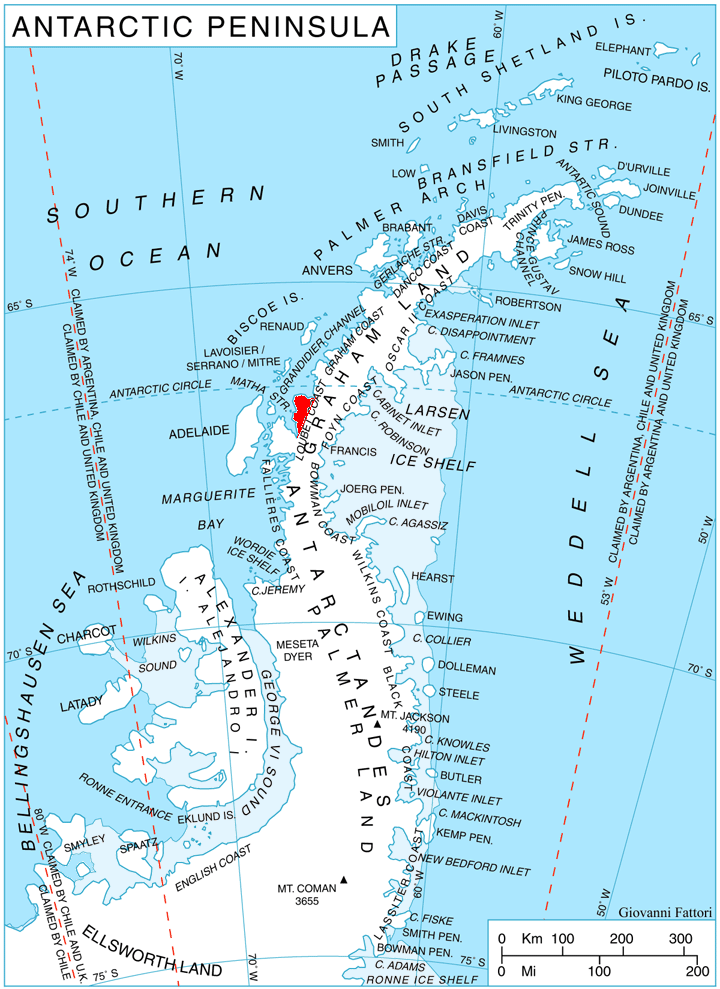
- Location of Pernik Peninsula on Loubet Coast, Antarctic Peninsula

- Location within Antarctica
- Location: Graham Land
- Coordinates: 66°51′00″S 66°03′20″W
- Length: 7 nmi (13 km; 8 mi)
- Width: 1 nmi (2 km; 1 mi)
- Thickness: unknown
- Terminus: Wilkinson Glacier
- Status: unknown

Blagun Glacier (Bulgarian: ледник Благун, romanized: lednik Blagun, IPA: [ˈlɛdniɡ bɫɐˈɡun]) is the 13 km long and 2.3 km wide glacier on Pernik Peninsula, Loubet Coast in Graham Land, Antarctica, situated southwest of Dolie Glacier and northeast of Peyna Glacier. It flows northwestwards between Lane Ridge and Hodge Ridge, and joins Wilkinson Glacier.

The glacier is named after the settlement of Blagun in Southern Bulgaria.

== Location ==
Blagun Glacier is centred at 66°51′00″S 66°03′20″W. British mapping in 1976.

== See also ==
- List of glaciers in the Antarctic
- Glaciology

== Maps ==
- Antarctic Digital Database (ADD). Scale 1:250000 topographic map of Antarctica. Scientific Committee on Antarctic Research (SCAR). Since 1993, regularly upgraded and updated.
- British Antarctic Territory. Scale 1:200000 topographic map. DOS 610 Series, Sheet W 66 64. Directorate of Overseas Surveys, Tolworth, UK, 1976.
- British Antarctic Territory. Scale 1:200000 topographic map. DOS 610 Series, Sheet W 66 66. Directorate of Overseas Surveys, Tolworth, UK, 1976.
