= Renard Glacier =

Glacier in Antarctica

Renard Glacier (64°40′S 61°38′W) is a glacier flowing into the southernmost part of Charlotte Bay, on the west coast of Graham Land. Charted by the Belgian Antarctic Expedition under Gerlache, 1897–99. Named by the United Kingdom Antarctic Place-Names Committee (UK-APC) in 1960 for Charles Renard (1847–1905), who, with A.C. Krebs, constructed and flew the first dirigible airship capable of steady flight under control, in 1884.
