= Somers Glacier =

Glacier in Graham Land, Antarctica

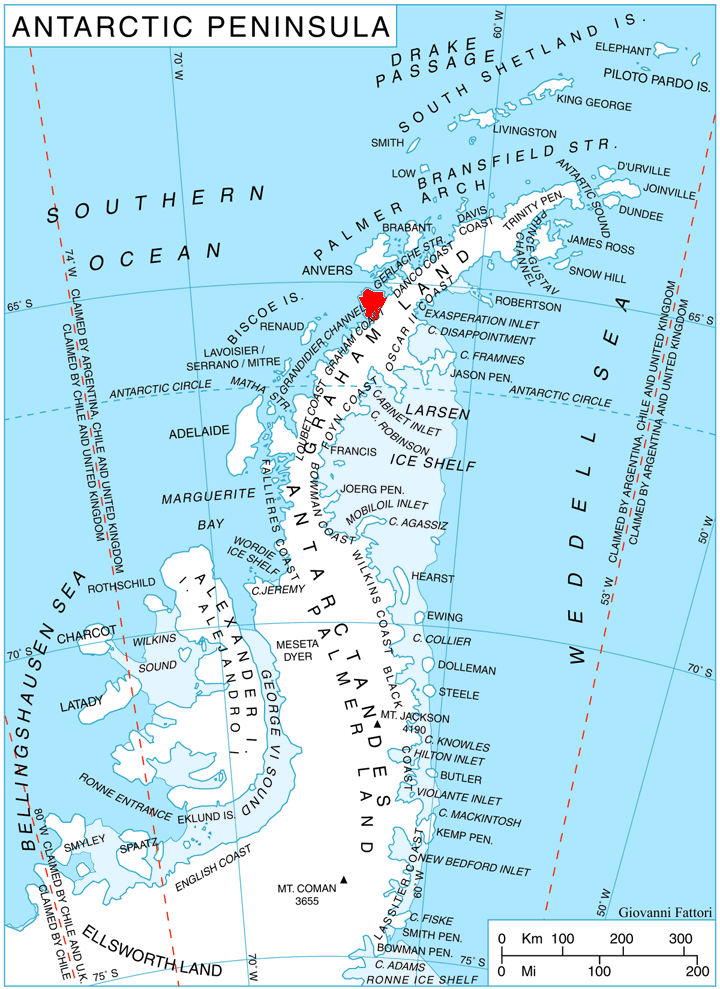
Location of Kyiv Peninsula in Graham Land, Antarctic Peninsula.

Somers Glacier (65°22′S 63°31′W) is a glacier flowing northwest into Trooz Glacier on Kyiv Peninsula, the west coast of Graham Land. First charted by the British Graham Land Expedition (BGLE) under Rymill, 1934–37. Named by the United Kingdom Antarctic Place-Names Committee (UK-APC) in 1959 for Henri Somers, chief engineer of the BelgAE's ship Belgica, which explored in the area in 1897–99.
