= Avsyuk Glacier =

Glacier in Antarctica

- Location within Antarctica
- Location: Graham Land
- Coordinates: 67°7′S 67°15′W
- Thickness: unknown
- Highest elevation: 550 m (1,804 ft)
- Terminus: Shumskiy Cove
- Status: unknown

Avsyuk Glacier (67°7′S 67°15′W) is a glacier on Arrowsmith Peninsula, Graham Land, flowing northwest to Shumskiy Cove.

== History ==
Avsyuk Glacier was named by the UK Antarctic Place-Names Committee in 1960 for Grigory A. Avsyuk, Russian glaciologist, a specialist on the glaciers of central Asia.

== See also ==
- List of glaciers in the Antarctic
- Glaciology
