= Sohm Glacier =

Glacier in Graham Land, Antarctica

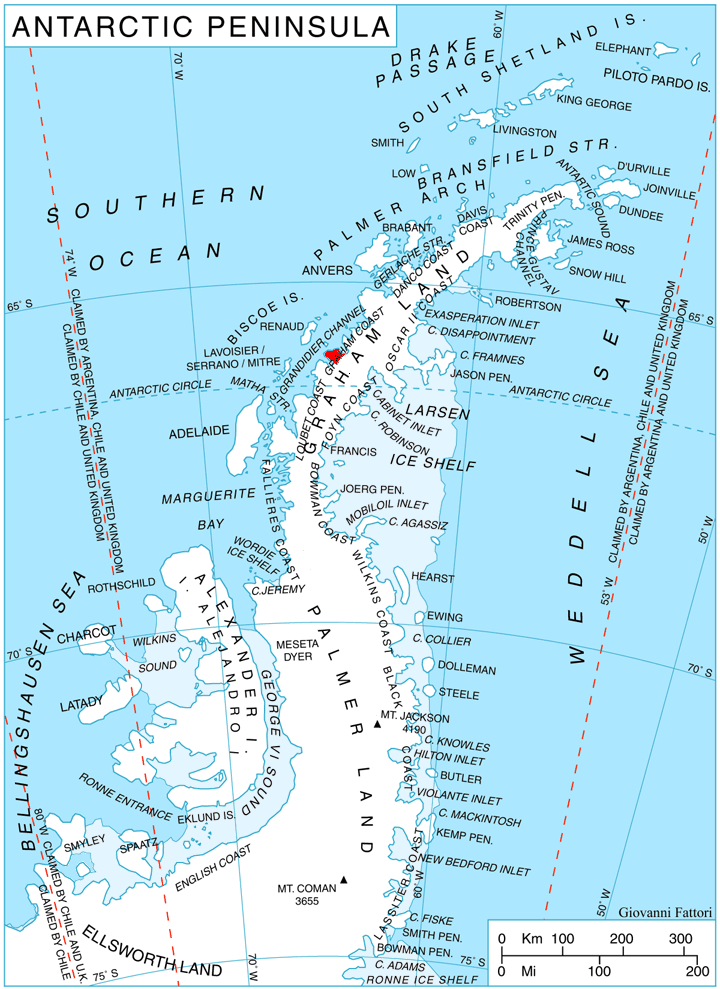
Location of Velingrad Peninsula on Graham Coast, Antarctic Peninsula.

Sohm Glacier (66°7′S 64°49′W) is a glacier flowing into Bilgeri Glacier on Velingrad Peninsula, the west coast of Graham Land. Charted by the British Graham Land Expedition (BGLE) under Rymill, 1934–37. Named by the United Kingdom Antarctic Place-Names Committee (UK-APC) in 1959 for Victor Sohm, Austrian skiing exponent who invented a special type of ski skins and ski wax.
