= Kutlovitsa Glacier =

Glacier in Antarctica

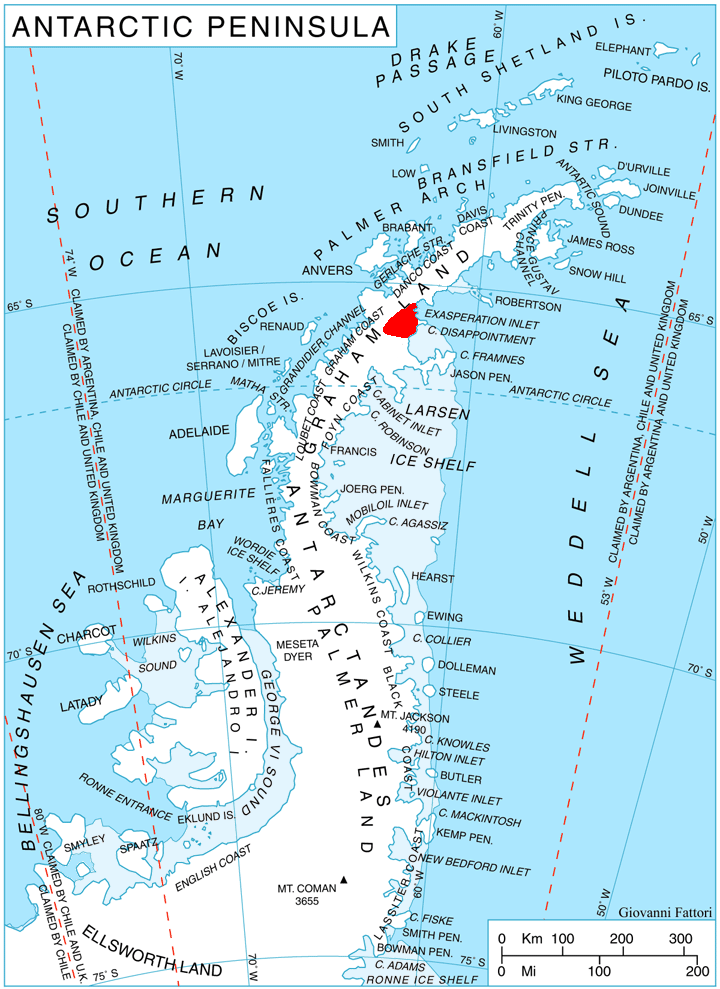
Location of Aristotle Mountains on the Antarctic Peninsula.

Kutlovitsa Glacier (Bulgarian: ледник Кутловица, romanized: lednik Kutlovitsa, IPA: [ˈlɛdnik ˈkutɫovit͡sɐ]) is the 9.4 km long and 4.2 km wide glacier in southern Aristotle Mountains on Oscar II Coast in Graham Land, Antarctica situated north of Flask Glacier. It is draining the southeast slopes of Madrid Dome, and flowing southeastwards along the north slopes of Mount Fedallah to join Belogradchik Glacier.

The feature is named after the settlement of Kutlovitsa in northeastern Bulgaria.

== Location ==
Kutlovitsa Glacier is located at 65°43′00″S 62°47′30″W. British mapping in 1976.

== Maps ==
- Antarctic Digital Database (ADD). Scale 1:250000 topographic map of Antarctica. Scientific Committee on Antarctic Research (SCAR). Since 1993, regularly upgraded and updated.
