= Lesicheri Glacier =

Glacier in Antarctica

Location of Oscar II Coast on Antarctic Peninsula.

Lesicheri Glacier (Bulgarian: ледник Лесичери, romanized: lednik Lesicheri, IPA: [ˈlɛdnik lɛˈsit͡ʃɛri]) is the 7 km long and 3 km wide glacier on Oscar II Coast in Graham Land situated west of Minzuhar Glacier and northeast of Erden Glacier. It drains the southeast slopes of Forbidden Plateau, and flows southeastwards to join Jorum Glacier west of Yordanov Nunatak. The feature is named after the settlement of Lesicheri in Northern Bulgaria.

== Location ==
Lesicheri Glacier is located at 65°09′10″S 62°19′50″W. British mapping in 1976.

== Maps ==
- British Antarctic Territory. Scale 1:200000 topographic map. DOS 610 Series, Sheet W 65 62. Directorate of Overseas Surveys, Tolworth, UK, 1976.
- Antarctic Digital Database (ADD). Scale 1:250000 topographic map of Antarctica. Scientific Committee on Antarctic Research (SCAR). Since 1993, regularly upgraded and updated.
