= Saussure Glacier =

Glacier in Antarctica

Saussure Glacier (67°11′S 67°0′W) is a glacier flowing northeast from Tyndall Mountains, Arrowsmith Peninsula, into Lallemand Fjord, Loubet Coast. Photographed from the air by Falkland Islands and Dependencies Aerial Survey Expedition (FIDASE) in 1957. Named by the United Kingdom Antarctic Place-Names Committee (UK-APC) in association with the names of glaciologists grouped in the area after Horace Bénédict de Saussure (1740–99), Genevan naturalist and physicist, who in 1787 was the first to recognize that erratic boulders had been moved great distances by ice.
