= Lind Glacier =

Glacier in Antarctica

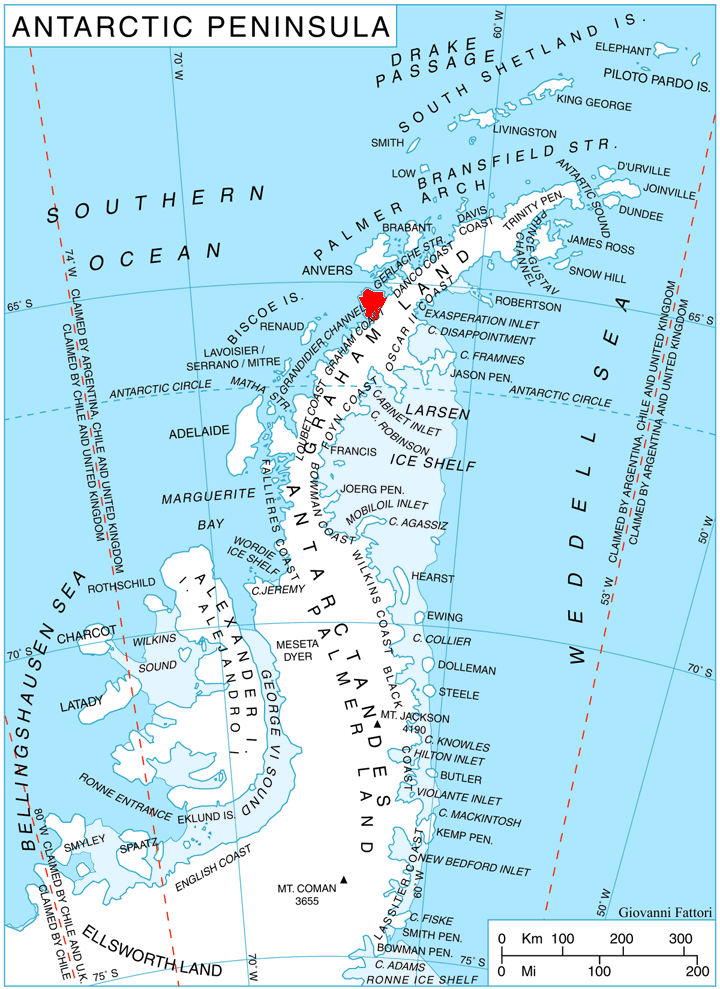
Location of Kyiv Peninsula in Graham Land, Antarctic Peninsula.

Lind Glacier (65°23′S 64°1′W) is a glacier flowing west from Alencar Peak into the southern part of Collins Bay, on the west coast of Kyiv Peninsula in Graham Land, Antarctica. It was first charted by the Fourth French Antarctic Expedition under Jean-Baptiste Charcot, 1908–10, and was named by the UK Antarctic Place-Names Committee in 1959 for James Lind, the Scottish "founder of modern naval hygiene," who was the first to publish a convincing account of experimental work establishing the dietary cause and cure of scurvy, in 1755.
