= Mitterling Glacier =

Glacier in Antarctica

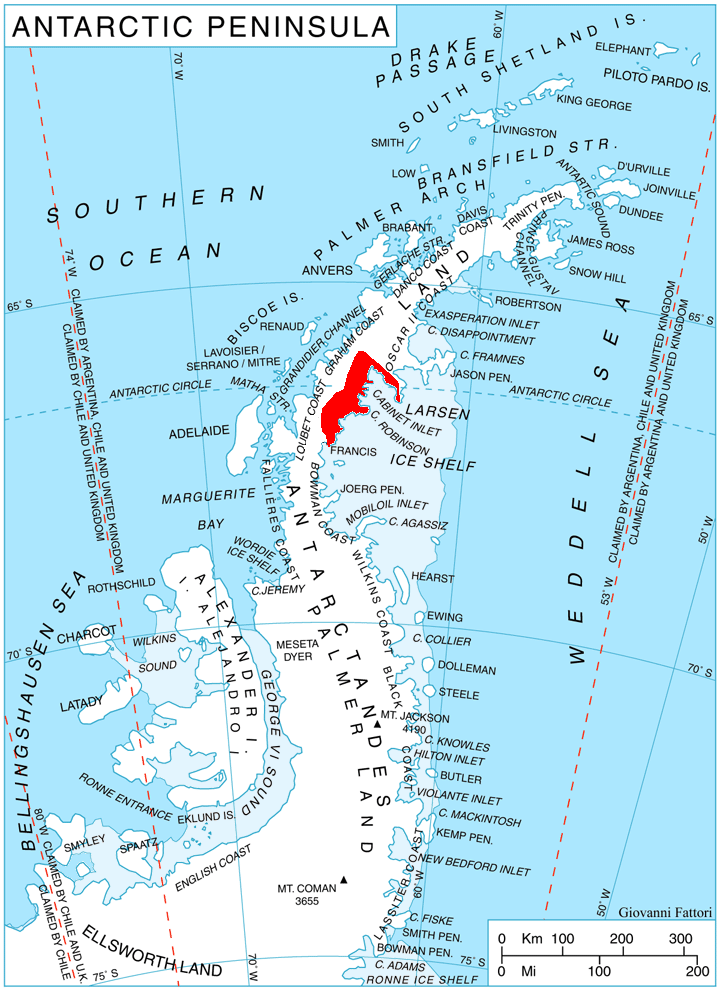
Location of Foyn Coast on Antarctic Peninsula.

Mitterling Glacier (66°50′S 64°18′W) is a glacier on the east coast of Graham Land, Antarctica, draining between Mount Vartdal and Mount Hayes into the northern part of Mill Inlet. It was named by the UK Antarctic Place-Names Committee after American historian Philip I. Mitterling, the author of America in the Antarctic to 1840.
