= Bradford Glacier =

Glacier in Antarctica

- Location within Antarctica
- Location: Graham Land
- Coordinates: 65°51′00″S 64°18′00″W
- Thickness: unknown
- Highest elevation: 1,033 m (3,389 ft)
- Terminus: Comrie Glacier
- Status: unknown

Bradford Glacier (65°51′S 64°18′W) is a glacier flowing north from Mount Dewey into Comrie Glacier, on the west coast of Graham Land. It was mapped by the Falkland Islands Dependencies Survey from photos taken by Hunting Aerosurveys Ltd in 1956–57, and named by the UK Antarctic Place-Names Committee for Samuel C. Bradford (1878–1948), English documentalist who was a pioneer advocate of scientific information services.

== See also ==
- List of glaciers in the Antarctic
- Glaciology
