= Quartermain Glacier =

Glacier in Antarctica

Quartermain Glacier (67°1′S 65°9′W) is a well-defined, highly crevassed glacier on the north side of Fricker Glacier, from which it is separated in its upper reaches by Mount Kennett. It flows from the plateau into Mill Inlet on the east coast of Graham Land, and was named by the United Kingdom Antarctic Place-Names Committee (UK-APC) for Leslie B. Quartermain (Quartermain Mountains, Quartermain Point, q.v.), New Zealand historian of the Antarctic and author of South to the Pole. The early history of the Ross Sea Sector (London, 1967).

== See also ==
- List of glaciers in the Antarctic
