= Tofani Glacier =

Glacier in Graham Land, Antarctica

Tofani Glacier (68°21′S 65°35′W) is a glacier flowing northeast into the head of Solberg Inlet, Bowman Coast, to the north of Houser Peak. The feature was photographed from the air by United States Antarctic Service (USAS), 1940, U.S. Navy, 1966, and was surveyed by Falkland Islands Dependencies Survey (FIDS), 1946–48. Named by Advisory Committee on Antarctic Names (US-ACAN) in 1977 after Dr. Walter Tofani, M.D., station physician at Palmer Station, 1975.
