= Eden Glacier =

Glacier in Antarctica

Eden Glacier (66°12′S 63°15′W) is a glacier 5 nautical miles (9 km) long, which flows in a southerly direction into the head of Cabinet Inlet, northwest of Lyttelton Ridge, on the east coast of Graham Land. It was charted by the Falkland Islands Dependencies Survey (FIDS) and photographed from the air by the Ronne Antarctic Research Expedition in 1947. It was named by the FIDS for Rt. Hon. Robert Anthony Eden, M.P., then British Secretary of State for Foreign Affairs and member of the War Cabinet.
