= Gould Glacier =

Glacier in Antarctica

Coordinates: 66°47′S 64°39′W

Gould Glacier () is a glacier, 12 miles (19 km) long, on the east coast of Graham Land, Antarctica, flowing south-east into Mill Inlet, to the west of Aagaard Glacier. It was first surveyed by the Falkland Islands Dependencies Survey in 1946–47, and named "East Gould Glacier". Together with "West Gould Glacier" it was reported to fill a transverse depression across Graham Land, but further survey in 1957 showed that there is no close topographical alignment between the two. The name Gould Glacier, after Rupert T. Gould, a British polar historian and cartographer, is now only applied to this glacier, and the west glacier is now called Erskine Glacier.
