= Lewis Glacier (Antarctica) =

Glacier in Antarctica

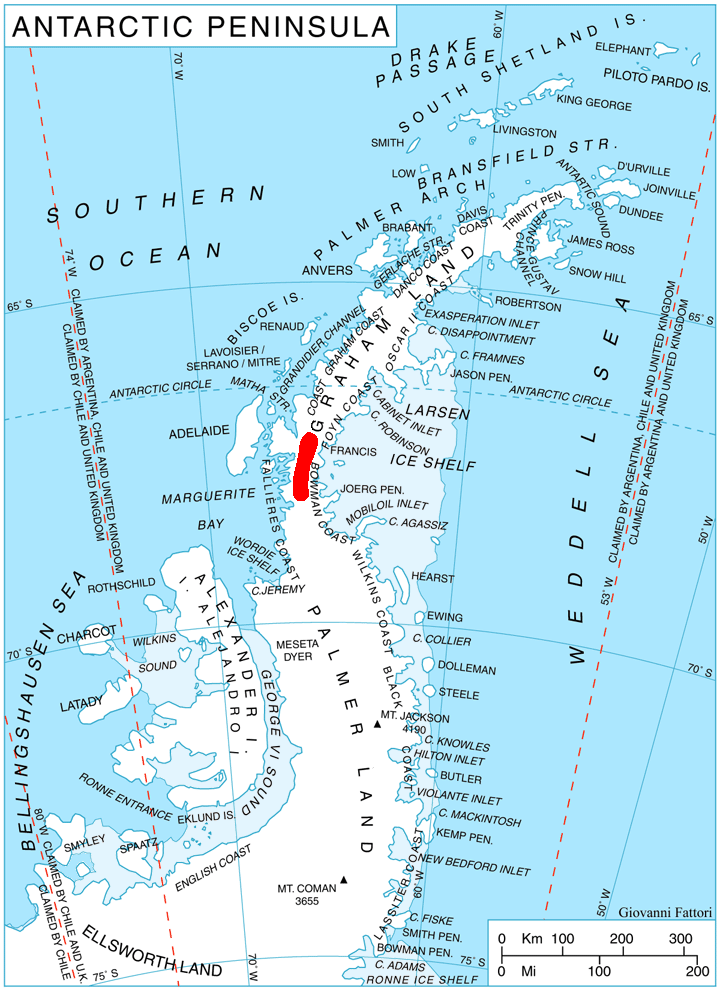
Location of Hemimont Plateau on the Antarctic Peninsula.

Lewis Glacier (67°45′S 65°40′W) is the northerly of two glaciers flowing from Hemimont Plateau east into Seligman Inlet, on the east coast of Graham Land, Antarctica. The glacier was photographed from the air by the United States Antarctic Service in 1940. It was charted in 1947 by the Falkland Islands Dependencies Survey, who named it for British glaciologist William Vaughan Lewis, a lecturer at the Department of Geography, Cambridge University.
