= Ilchev Buttress =

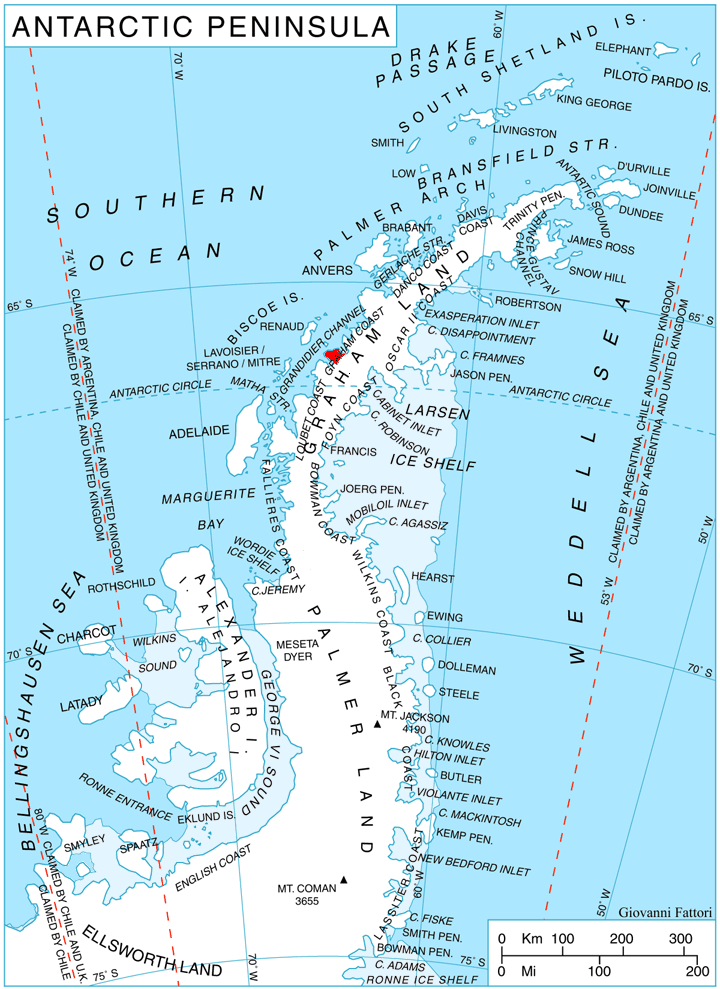
Location of Velingrad Peninsula on Graham Land, Antarctic Peninsula.

Ilchev Buttress (Bulgarian: Илчев рид, ‘Ilchev Rid’ \'il-chev 'rid\) is the rocky, partly ice-covered buttress extending 5 km in north-south direction, 2.2 km wide and 1374 m high, forming the northeast extremity of Chiren Heights on Velingrad Peninsula, Graham Coast in Graham Land, Antarctica. It has steep and partly ice-free west, north and east slopes, and surmounts Sohm Glacier to the west, Bilgeri Glacier to the northwest, Byaga Point and Barilari Bay to the northeast, and Weir Glacier to the southeast.

The buttress is named after Ivan Ilchev, rector of Sofia University (2007–2015), for his support for the Bulgarian Antarctic programme.

== Location ==
Ilchev Buttress is located at 66°02′00″S 64°44′07″W, which is 7.8 km east of Mount Zdarsky, 8.5 km southeast of Mount Paulcke, 4.1 km west of Prestoy Point and 10.2 km northwest of Mount Genecand. British mapping in 1976.

== Maps ==
- Antarctic Digital Database (ADD). Scale 1:250000 topographic map of Antarctica. Scientific Committee on Antarctic Research (SCAR). Since 1993, regularly upgraded and updated.
- British Antarctic Territory. Scale 1:200000 topographic map. DOS 610 Series, Sheet W 66 64. Directorate of Overseas Surveys, Tolworth, UK, 1976.
