= Mitino Buttress =

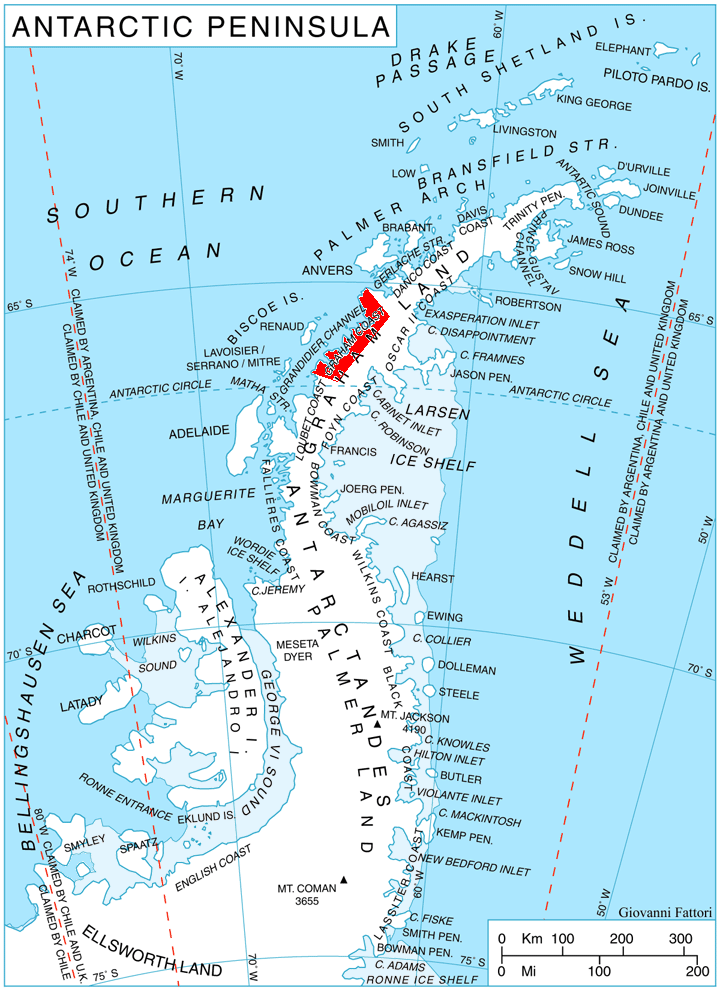
Location of Graham Coast on the Antarctic Peninsula.

Mitino Buttress (Bulgarian: рид Митино, ‘Rid Mitino’ \'rid 'mi-ti-no\) is the rounded ice-covered buttress extending 14 km in south-southeast to north-northwest direction and 7 km wide, rising to 2072 m in the west foothills of Bruce Plateau on Graham Coast in Graham Land, Antarctica. Two offshoots of the feature form Mezzo Buttress on the west and Strelcha Spur on the north respectively. It has steep and partly ice-free northwest, north and northeast slopes, and surmounts Birley Glacier to the northeast and Lawrie Glacier to the west.

The buttress is named after the settlement of Mitino in Southwestern Bulgaria.

== Location ==
Mitino Buttress is located at 66°02′12″S 64°23′50″W, which is12.3 km northeast of Mount Genecand, 11.15 km east of Prestoy Point, 7.3 km southeast of Vardun Point, 15.13 km south-southwest of Mount Dewey, and 41.15 km west of Kyulevcha Nunatak on Oscar II Coast. British mapping in 1976.

== Maps ==
- Antarctic Digital Database (ADD). Scale 1:250000 topographic map of Antarctica. Scientific Committee on Antarctic Research (SCAR). Since 1993, regularly upgraded and updated.
- British Antarctic Territory. Scale 1:200000 topographic map. DOS 610 Series, Sheet W 66 64. Directorate of Overseas Surveys, Tolworth, UK, 1976.
