= Alabak Island =

Island in Graham Land, Antarctica

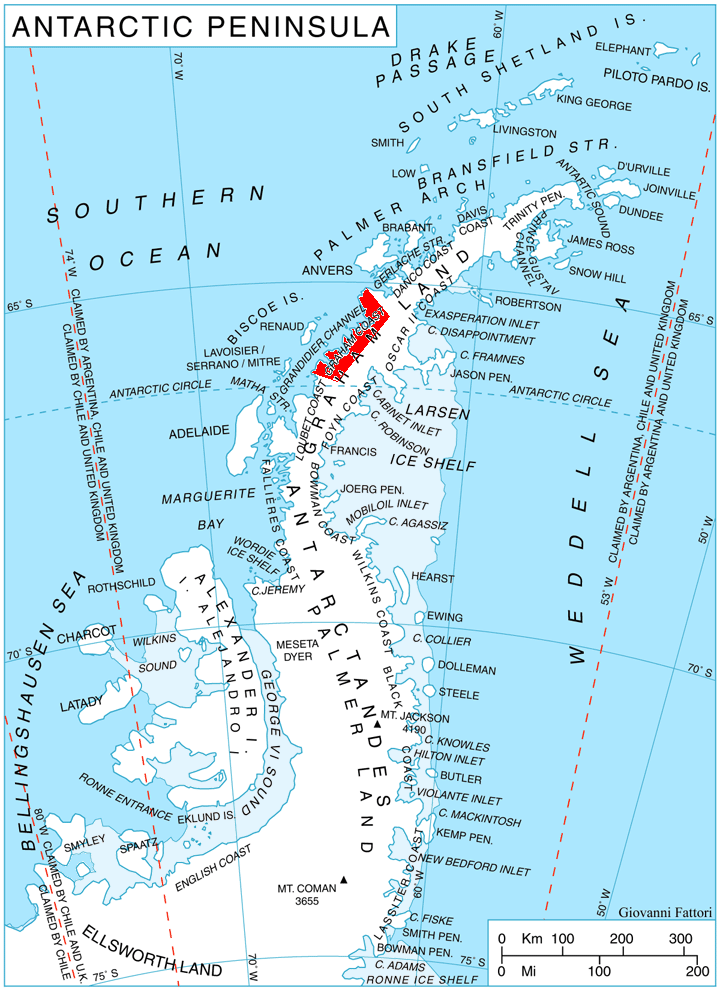
- Location of Graham Coast on the Antarctic Peninsula

- Location within Antarctica Location within Antarctic Peninsula

Geography
- Location: Antarctica
- Coordinates: 65°59′25″S 64°43′50″W

Administration
- Administered under the Antarctic Treaty System

Demographics
- Population: Uninhabited

Alabak Island (Bulgarian: остров Алабак, romanized: Ostrov alabak, IPA: [ˈɔstrof ɐɫɐˈbak]) is the mostly ice-covered hilly island in Barilari Bay on Graham Coast in Graham Land, Antarctica extending 1.35 km in east-west direction, 670 m wide, and ending in Huitfeldt Point to the east. It is separated from the east coast of Velingrad Peninsula by a 500 m wide passage formed as a result of glacier retreat in the last decade of 20th century.

The island is named after Alabak Ridge in Southern Bulgaria.

== Location ==
Alabak Island is located 4.74 km southeast of Vorweg Point, and 11.15 km southwest of Duyvis Point on Felipe Solo (Obligado) Peninsula. British mapping in 1971.

== Maps ==
- British Antarctic Territory. Scale 1:200000 topographic map. DOS 610 Series, Sheet W 65 64. Directorate of Overseas Surveys, Tolworth, UK, 1971.
- Antarctic Digital Database (ADD). Scale 1:250000 topographic map of Antarctica. Scientific Committee on Antarctic Research (SCAR). Since 1993, regularly upgraded and updated.
