= Rasnik Peak =

Mountain peak in Antarctica

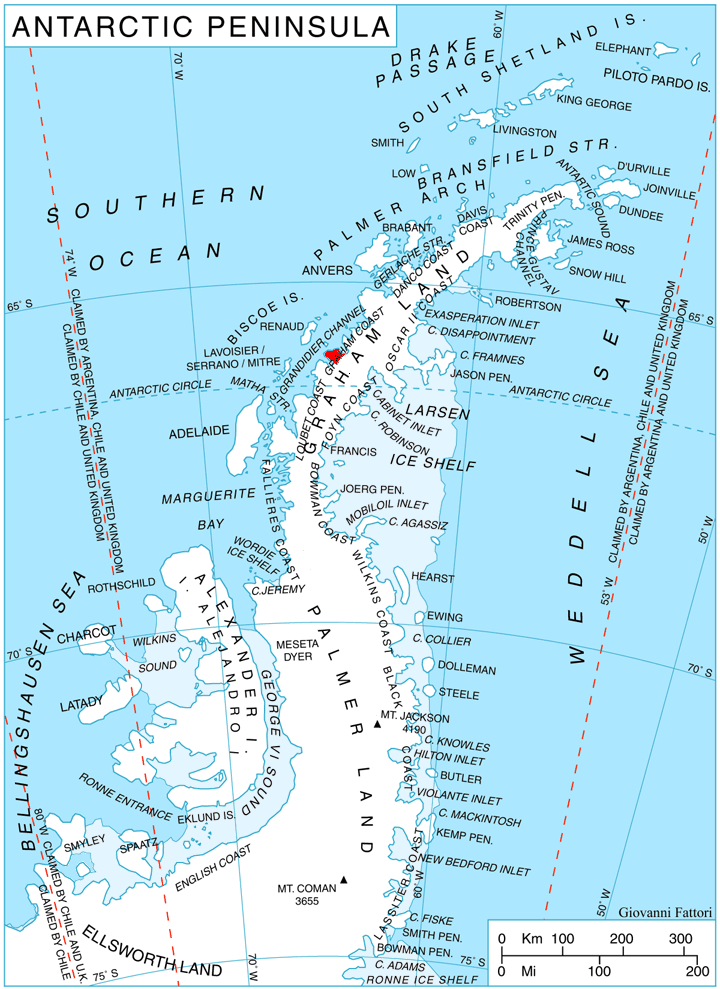
Location of Velingrad Peninsula on Graham Land, Antarctic Peninsula.

Rasnik Peak (Bulgarian: връх Расник, romanized: vrah Rasnik, IPA: [ˈvrɤx rɐsˈnik]) is the sharp, partly ice-covered peak rising to 1066 m at the southwest extremity of Chiren Heights on Velingrad Peninsula, Graham Coast in Graham Land, Antarctica. It has steep and partly ice-free northwest and southeast slopes, and surmounts Hugi Glacier and its tributary Caulfield Glacier to the south, and Holtedahl Bay to the west.

The peak is named after the settlement of Rasnik in Western Bulgaria.

== Location ==
Rasnik Peak is located at 66°09′01″S 64°59′22″W, which is 17 km east of Lens Peak, 6.75 km southeast of Coblentz Peak and 9.9 km north of Ezerets Knoll. British mapping in 1976.

== Maps ==
- Antarctic Digital Database (ADD). Scale 1:250000 topographic map of Antarctica. Scientific Committee on Antarctic Research (SCAR). Since 1993, regularly upgraded and updated.
- British Antarctic Territory. Scale 1:200000 topographic map. DOS 610 Series, Sheet W 66 64. Directorate of Overseas Surveys, Tolworth, UK, 1976.
