= Chiren Heights =

Mountain in Antarctica

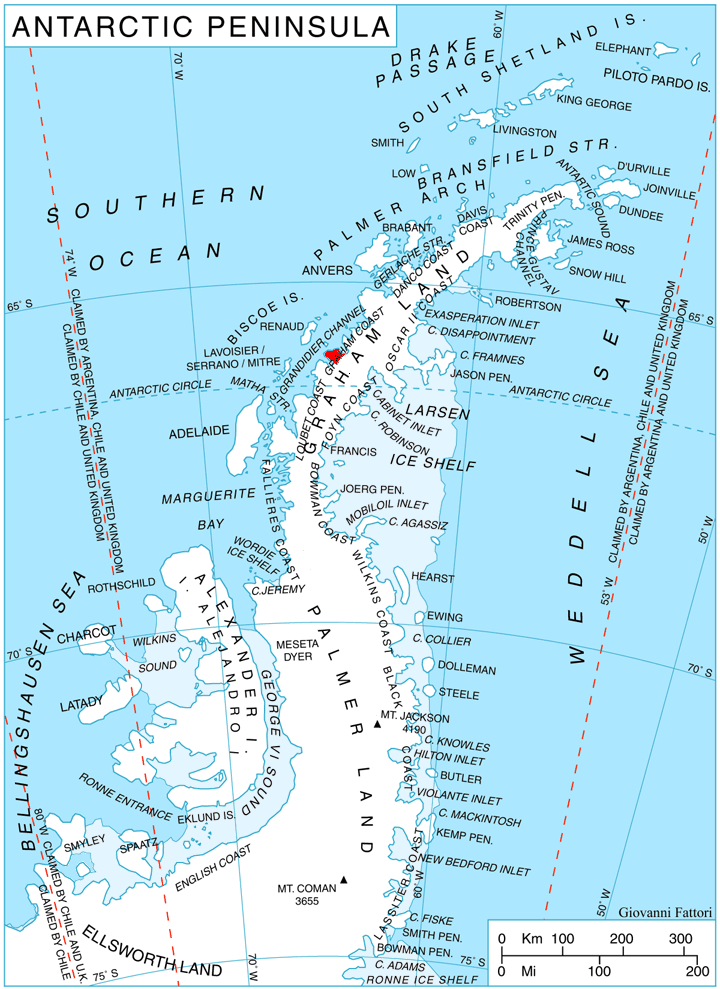
Location of Velingrad Peninsula on Graham Coast, Antarctic Peninsula.

Chiren Heights (Bulgarian: Чиренски възвишения, ‘Chirenski Vazvisheniya’ \'chi-ren-ski vaz-vi-'she-ni-ya\) is the ice-covered heights at the base of Velingrad Peninsula, Graham Coast on the west side of Antarctic Peninsula, extending 21 km in northeast–southwest direction between Barilari Bay and Holtedahl Bay, and 16 km wide. It is bounded by Caulfield Glacier to the south, Simler Snowfield to the west, Hoek Glacier to the northwest, Bilgeri Glacier to the north and Weir Glacier to the east. Rising to 2197 m at its central part and featuring Coblentz Peak at its west extremity, Mount Zdarsky in its north-central part and Ilchev Buttress at its northeast extremity.

The heights are named after the settlement of Chiren in Northwestern Bulgaria.

== Location ==
Chiren Heights are centred at 66°06′35″S 64°49′30″W. British mapping in 1971.

== Maps ==
- British Antarctic Territory. Scale 1:200000 topographic map. DOS 610 Series, Sheet W 66 64. Directorate of Overseas Surveys, Tolworth, UK, 1976.
- Antarctic Digital Database (ADD). Scale 1:250000 topographic map of Antarctica. Scientific Committee on Antarctic Research (SCAR), 1993–2016.
