= Byaga Point =

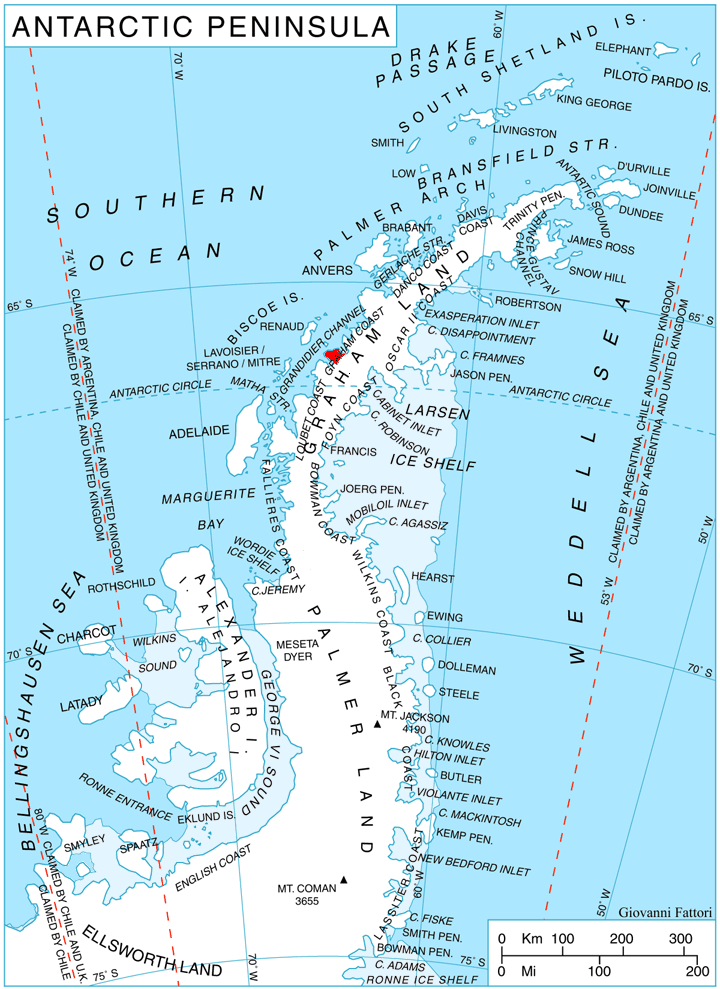
Location of Velingrad Peninsula on Graham Land, Antarctic Peninsula.

Byaga Point (Bulgarian: нос Бяга, ‘Nos Byaga’ \'nos 'bya-ga\) is the ice-covered point on the northeast coast of Velingrad Peninsula projecting 1 km into the head of Barilari Bay on Graham Coast in Graham Land, Antarctica, formed by an offshoot of Ilchev Buttress. The point is named after the settlement of Byaga in Southern Bulgaria.

== Location ==
Byaga Point is located at 66°00′47″S 64°42′37″W, which is 7.77 km south-southeast of Vorweg Point, 14.5 km southwest of Duyvis Point and 6.57 km west-southwest of Cherkovna Point. British mapping in 1976.

== Maps ==
- Antarctic Digital Database (ADD). Scale 1:250000 topographic map of Antarctica. Scientific Committee on Antarctic Research (SCAR). Since 1993, regularly upgraded and updated.
- British Antarctic Territory. Scale 1:200000 topographic map. DOS 610 Series, Sheet W 66 64. Directorate of Overseas Surveys, Tolworth, UK, 1976.
