= Tricouni (brand) =

British luxury fashion house

- Industry: Fashion
- Headquarters: London, England

Tricouni Brand Ltd is a British luxury fashion house, designing women’s luxury outerwear. Tricouni is a privately held company, headquartered in London, England. The company was founded in the early 1900s by Geneva-based jeweller and alpinist enthusiast, Felix-Valentin “Tricouni” Genecand. Tricouni was most noted for inventing the modern shoe-buckling system, the arrêt-de-cordon (cord stop), and the Tricouni clou. The Tricouni clou was used by George Mallory and his team on his historic journey up Mount Everest. In recognition of his inventions, Tricouni Peak in Canada and Mount Genecand in Antarctica were named after Tricouni. Tricouni Brand Ltd re-launched in 2015 and specialises in creating elegant outerwear using high-end water-resistant and technical fabrics. Tricouni’s outerwear is designed and manufactured in the U.K.
