= Urovene Cove =

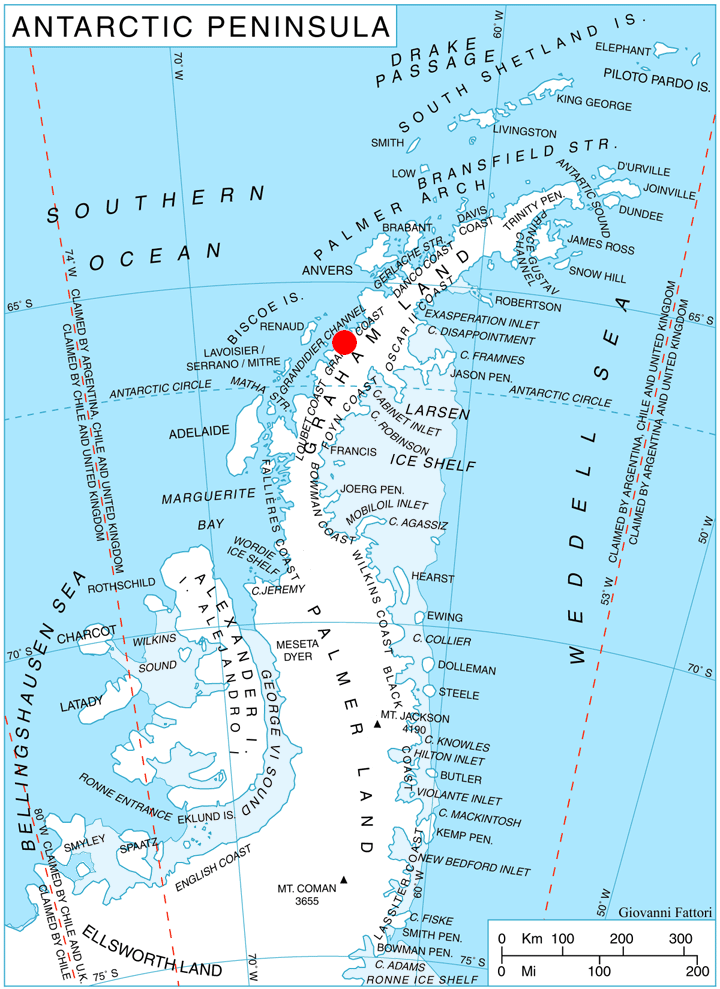
Location of Felipe Solo (Obligado) Peninsula in Graham Land, Antarctic Peninsula.

Urovene Cove (Bulgarian: залив Уровене, ‘Zaliv Urovene’ \'za-liv u-ro-'ve-ne\) is the 2.65 km wide cove indenting for 2.75 km the southwest coast of Felipe Solo (Obligado) Peninsula, Graham Coast on the Antarctic Peninsula. It is part of Barilari Bay, entered southeast of Laskar Point and northwest of Duyvis Point. The cove was formed as a result of glacier retreat during the last three decades of the 20th century.

The feature is named after the settlement of Urovene in Northwestern Bulgaria.

== Location ==
Urovene Cove is centred at 65°53′40″S 64°34′10″W. British mapping in 1971.

== Maps ==
- British Antarctic Territory. Scale 1:200000 topographic map. DOS 610 Series, Sheet W 65 64. Directorate of Overseas Surveys, Tolworth, UK, 1971.
- Antarctic Digital Database (ADD). Scale 1:250000 topographic map of Antarctica. Scientific Committee on Antarctic Research (SCAR). Since 1993, regularly upgraded and updated.
