= Ezerets Knoll =

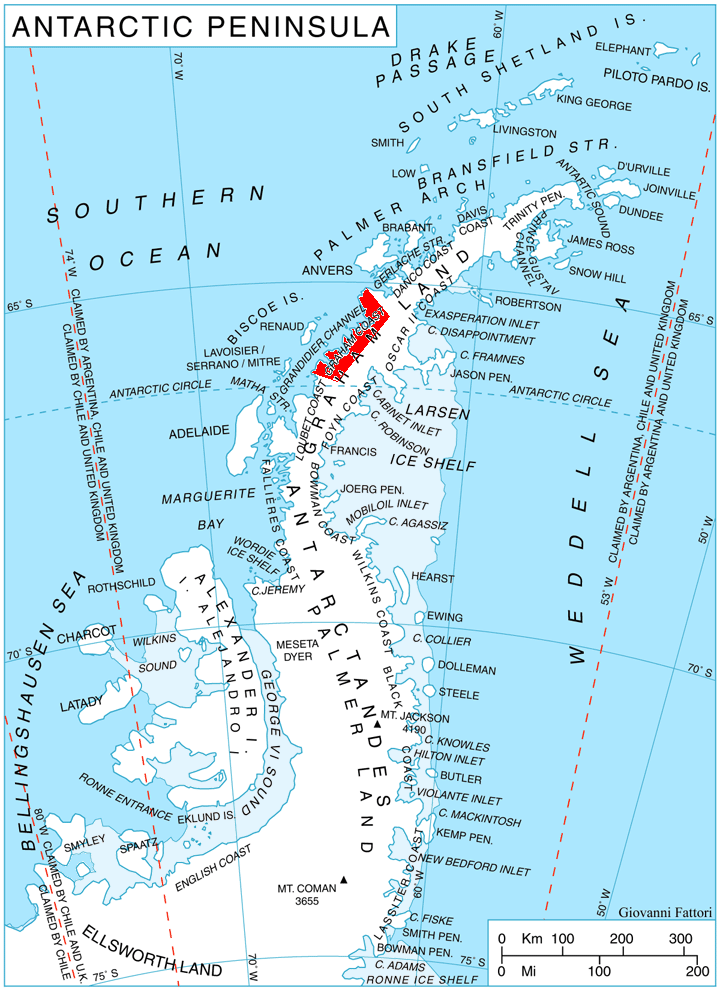
Location of Graham Coast on the Antarctic Peninsula.

Ezerets Knoll (Bulgarian: Езерецка могила, ‘Ezeretska Mogila’ \e-ze-'rets-ka mo-'gi-la\) is the narrow, mostly ice-covered ridge extending 3.35 km in west-northwest to east-southeast direction, 800 m wide and rising to 1294 m in the west foothills of Bruce Plateau on Graham Coast in Graham Land, Antarctica. It surmounts Hugi Glacier to the west and its tributary Rickmers Glacier to the northeast.

The knoll is named after the settlements of Ezerets in Northeastern and Southwestern Bulgaria.

== Location ==
Ezerets Knoll is located at 66°14′17″S 64°57′36″W, which is 16.2 km west-northwest of Richardson Nunatak, 18 km east of Crookes Peak, 6 km southwest of Dodunekov Bluff and 2.6 km southwest of Nauchene Nunatak. British mapping in 1976.

== Maps ==
- Antarctic Digital Database (ADD). Scale 1:250000 topographic map of Antarctica. Scientific Committee on Antarctic Research (SCAR). Since 1993, regularly upgraded and updated.
- Antarctic Digital Database (ADD). Scale 1:250000 topographic map of Antarctica. Scientific Committee on Antarctic Research (SCAR). Since 1993, regularly upgraded and updated.
