= Vardun Point =

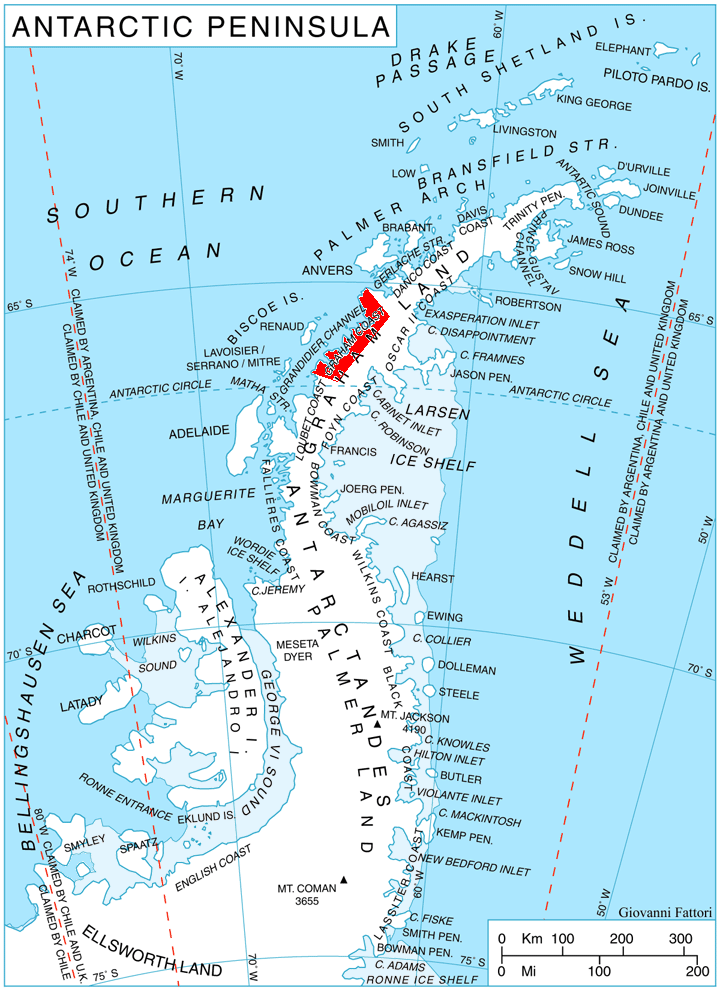
Location of Graham Coast on the Antarctic Peninsula.

Vardun Point (Bulgarian: нос Вардун, ‘Nos Vardun’ \'nos var-'dun\) is the point projecting 1 km into the head of Barilari Bay on Graham Coast in Graham Land, Antarctica, formed by an offshoot of Mitino Buttress. The point is named after the settlement of Vardun in Northeastern Bulgaria.

== Location ==
Vardun Point is located at 65°58′54″S 64°29′15″W, which is 13.85 km east-southeast of Vorweg Point, 9.17 km southeast of Duyvis Point, and 7.35 km northwest of the highest point of Mitino Buttress. British mapping in 1971.

== Maps ==
- Antarctic Digital Database (ADD). Scale 1:250000 topographic map of Antarctica. Scientific Committee on Antarctic Research (SCAR), 1993–2016.
- British Antarctic Territory. Scale 1:200000 topographic map. DOS 610 Series, Sheet W 65 64. Directorate of Overseas Surveys, Tolworth, UK, 1971.
