= Mount Zdarsky =

Mountain in Antarctica

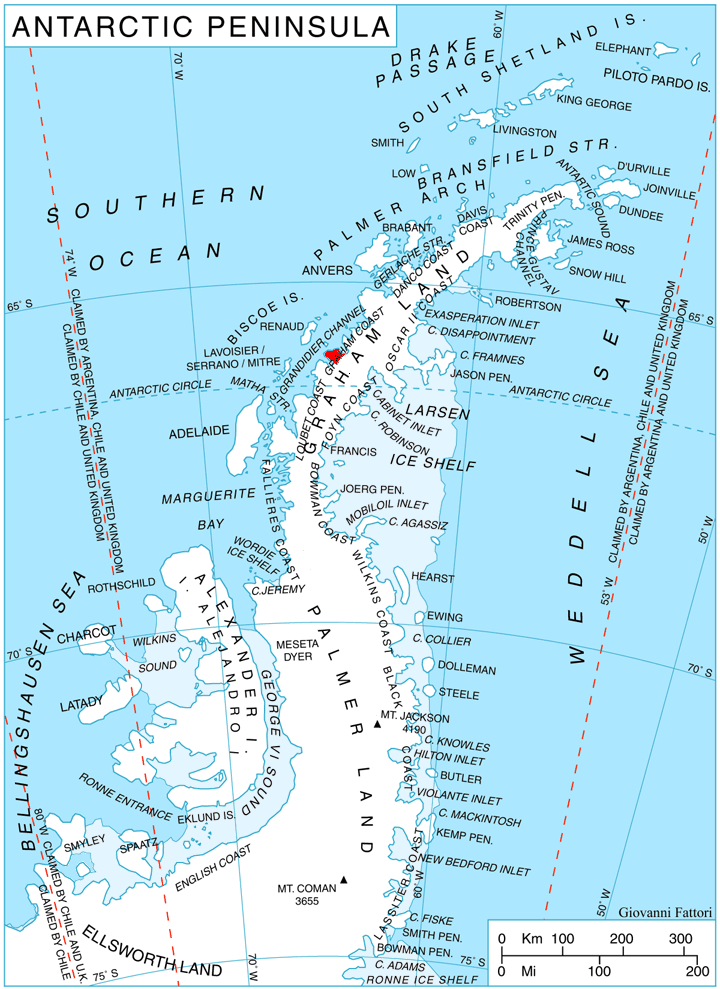
- Location of Velingrad Peninsula on Graham Coast, Antarctic Peninsula.

Highest point
- Elevation: 734 m (2,408 ft)
- Coordinates: 66°05′00″S 64°58′00″W

Geography
- Location within Antarctica
- Location: Graham Land, Antarctica

Mount Zdarsky is a mountain rising at the east side of Simler Snowfield on Velingrad Peninsula, between Barilari and Holtedahl Bays on the west coast of Graham Land, Antarctica. First charted and named "Mont Garcia" by the French Antarctic Expedition under Jean-Baptiste Charcot, 1908–10, presumably in association with his nearby "Cap Garcia".

Charcot later transferred "Cap Garcia" (now Cape Garcia) to the north entrance of Barilari Bay, leaving the mountain name on the south side. To avoid confusion with Cape Garcia on the other side of Barilari Bay, the United Kingdom Antarctic Place-Names Committee (UK-APC) altered the name of this mountain in 1959 to Mount Zdarsky. It is named for Mathias Zdarsky, the Austrian pioneer exponent of ski-mountaineering, inventor of the first dependable ski binding, and author of one of the earliest skiing manuals.
