= Strelcha Spur =

Mountain in Graham Land, Antarctica

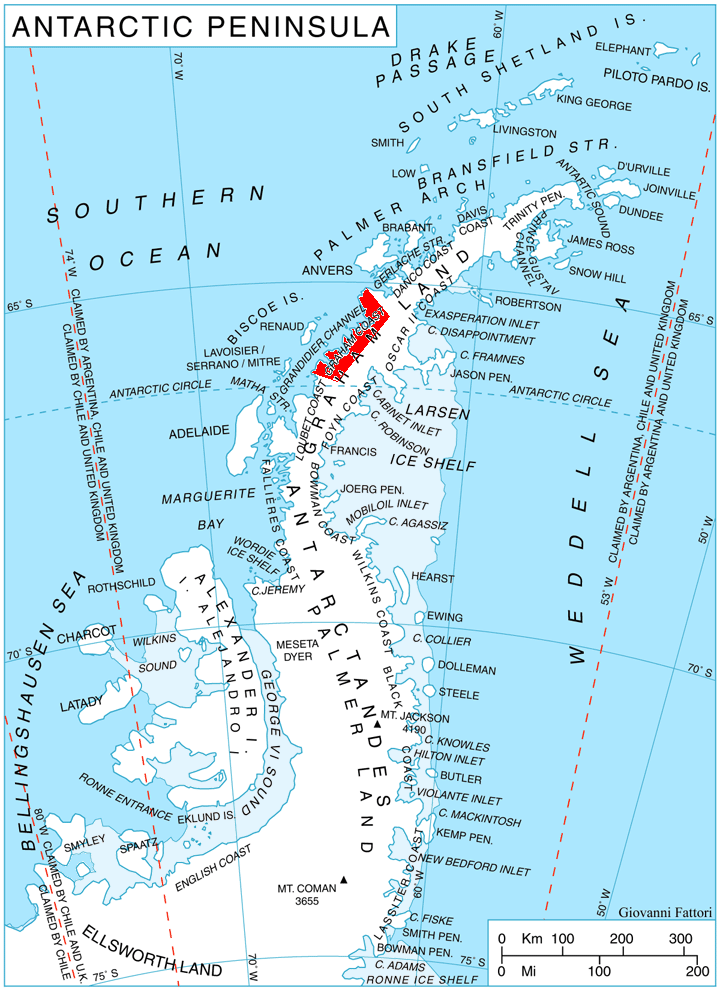
Location of Graham Coast on the Antarctic Peninsula.

Strelcha Spur (Bulgarian: рид Стрелча, ‘Rid Strelcha’ \'rid 'strel-cha\) is the rocky, partly ice-covered spur extending 5.3 km in south-southeast to north-northwest direction and 1.4 km wide, rising to 1572 m in the west foothills of Bruce Plateau on Graham Coast in Graham Land, Antarctica. It has steep and partly ice-free west, north and east slopes, and surmounts Birley Glacier to the north and east, and a tributary to that glacier to the west.

The spur is named after the town of Strelcha in Southern Bulgaria.

== Location ==
Strelcha Spur is located at 65°59′35″S 64°21′29″W, which is 9.56 km northeast of Mezzo Buttress, 6 km east of Vardun Point, 10 km south of Mount Dewey, and 38.8 km west of Kyulevcha Nunatak on Oscar II Coast.

== Maps ==
- Antarctic Digital Database (ADD). Scale 1:250000 topographic map of Antarctica. Scientific Committee on Antarctic Research (SCAR). Since 1993, regularly upgraded and updated.
- British Antarctic Territory. Scale 1:200000 topographic map. DOS 610 Series, Sheet W 65 64. Directorate of Overseas Surveys, Tolworth, UK, 1971.
