= Bilgeri =

Bilgeri may refer to:

== Places ==
- Bilgeri Glacier, glacier in Antarctica

== People ==
- Georg Bilgeri (1873-1934), officer in Austro-Hungarian Army, mountaineer, and pioneer of skiing
- Laura Bilgeri (born 1995), Austrian actress and model
- Sonja Bilgeri (born 1964), German former cross-country skier
- Veronika Bilgeri (born 1966), West German luger
