= Chiren =

Chiren may refer to:

- Chiren (Nostradamus), a person who appears in the predictions of Nostradamus
- Chiren (village), a village located in northwestern Bulgaria
