= Laskar Point =

Point on Graham Coast, Antarctica

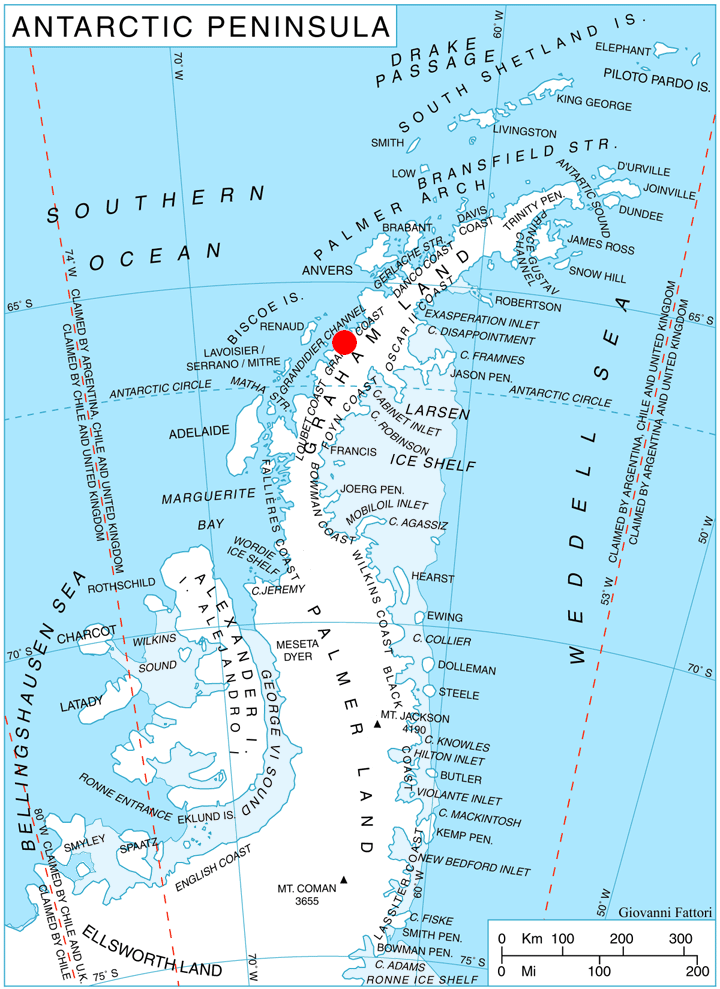
Location of Felipe Solo (Obligado) Peninsula in Graham Land, Antarctic Peninsula.

Laskar Point (Bulgarian: нос Ласкар, ‘Nos Laskar’ \'nos las-'kar\) is the point on the northwest side of the entrance to Urovene Cove on the southwest coast of Felipe Solo (Obligado) Peninsula, Graham Coast on the Antarctic Peninsula.

The feature is named after the settlement of Laskar in Northern Bulgaria.

== Location ==
Laskar Point is located at 65°53′18″S 64°36′31″W, which is 10.45 km northeast of Vorweg Point and 2.65 km northwest of Duyvis Point. British mapping in 1971.

== Maps ==
- British Antarctic Territory. Scale 1:200000 topographic map. DOS 610 Series, Sheet W 65 64. Directorate of Overseas Surveys, Tolworth, UK, 1971.
- Antarctic Digital Database (ADD). Scale 1:250000 topographic map of Antarctica. Scientific Committee on Antarctic Research (SCAR), 1993–2016.
