= Fontaine Heights =

Line of heights that extend from Mount Dewey to Cape Garcia

The Fontaine Heights (65°48′S 64°28′W) are a line of heights that extend from Mount Dewey to Cape Garcia on the south side of Bigo Bay, on the west coast of Graham Land, Antarctica. They were mapped from air photos and Falkland Islands Dependencies Survey surveys from 1955 to 1957, and they were named by the UK Antarctic Place-Names Committee for Henri La Fontaine, a Belgian documentalist. Fontaine was the co-founder of Institut International de Bibliographie at Brussels in 1895, and he was the co-founder of the Office Central des Associations Internationales at Brussels in 1907. He was an initiator of the Universal Decimal Classification.
