= Cherkovna Point =

Point in Graham Land, Antarctica

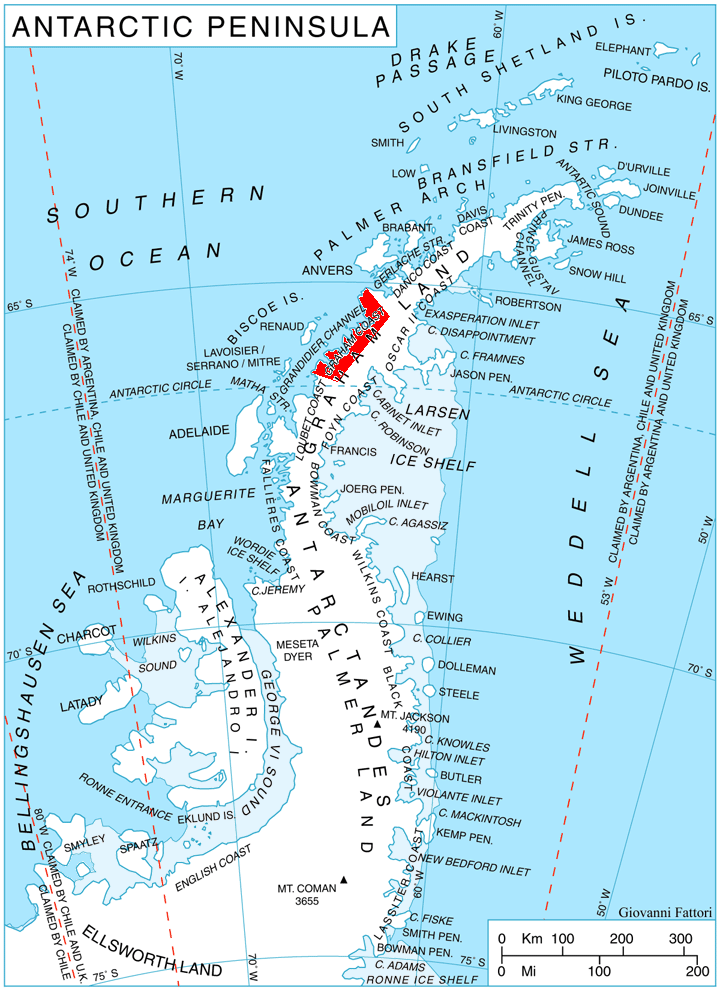
Location of Graham Coast on the Antarctic Peninsula

Cherkovna Point (Bulgarian: нос Черковна, ‘Nos Cherkovna’ \'nos cher-'kov-na\) is the sharp point projecting 1.7 km into the head of Barilari Bay on Graham Coast in Graham Land, Antarctica, formed by an offshoot of Mezzo Buttress. The point is named after the settlements of Cherkovna in Northeastern Bulgaria.

== Location ==
Cherkovna Point is located at 65°59′56″S 64°34′11″W, which is 11.1 km southeast of Vorweg Point, 10.2 km south of Duyvis Point, and 6.2 km northwest of the highest point of Mezzo Buttress. British mapping in 1971 and 1976.

== Maps ==
- Antarctic Digital Database (ADD). Scale 1:250000 topographic map of Antarctica. Scientific Committee on Antarctic Research (SCAR). Since 1993, regularly upgraded and updated.
- British Antarctic Territory. Scale 1:200000 topographic map. DOS 610 Series, Sheet W 65 64. Directorate of Overseas Surveys, Tolworth, UK, 1971.
- British Antarctic Territory. Scale 1:200000 topographic map. DOS 610 Series, Sheet W 66 64. Directorate of Overseas Surveys, Tolworth, UK, 1976.
