= Lawrie Glacier =

Glacier in Antarctica

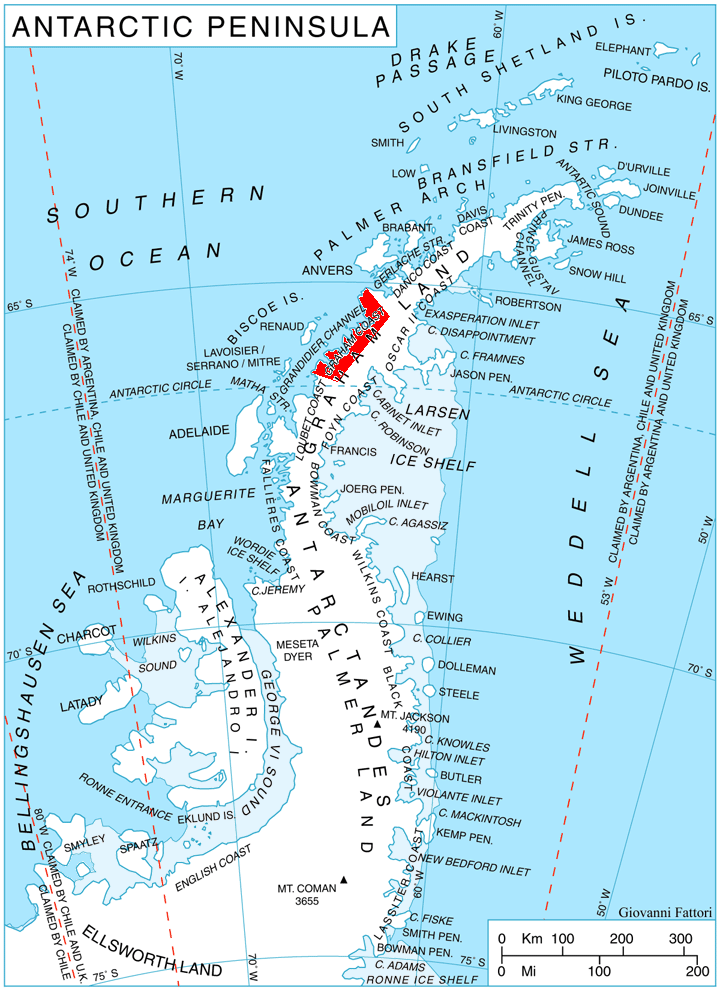
Location of Graham Coast on the Antarctic Peninsula.

Lawrie Glacier (66°4′S 64°36′W) is a glacier flowing between Mount Genecand and Mezzo Buttress, and entering the head of Barilari Bay between Cherkovna Point and Prestoy Point on the west coast of Graham Land, Antarctica. It was charted by the British Graham Land Expedition under Rymill, 1934–37, and was named by the UK Antarctic Place-Names Committee in 1959 for Robert Lawrie, an English alpine and polar equipment specialist.
