= Cloudburst (comics) =

Cloudburst, in comics, may refer to:

- Cloudburst, a member of the DC Comics team the Extremists
- Cloudburst (Image Comics), an Image Comics graphic novel written by Jimmy Palmiotti and Justin Gray
- Cloudburst (G.I. Joe), a fictional character in the G.I. Joe universe who has appeared in the comic book adaptations
- Cloudburst (Transformers), an Autobot Transformer who has appeared in the comic book adaptations

== See also ==
- Cloudburst (disambiguation)
