= Nauchene Nunatak =

Nunatak ridge in Graham Land, Antarctica

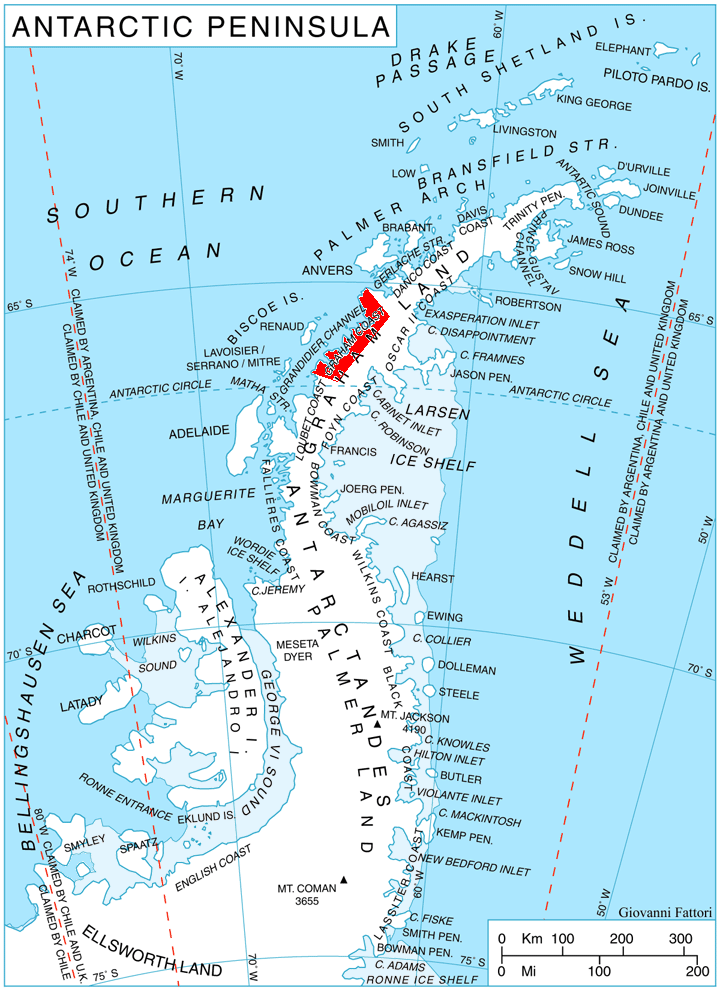
Location of Graham Coast on the Antarctic Peninsula.

Nauchene Nunatak (Bulgarian: нунатак Научене, ‘Nunatak Nauchene’ \'nu-na-tak na-'u-che-ne\) is the mostly ice-covered rocky ridge extending 1.2 km in northwest-southeast direction, 600 m wide and rising to 1163 m in lower Rickmers Glacier in the west foothills of Bruce Plateau on Graham Coast in Graham Land, Antarctica. It is named after the settlement of Nauchene in Southeastern Bulgaria.

== Location ==
Nauchene Nunatak is located at 66°13′05″S 64°55′46″W, which is 3.5 km south-southwest of Dodunekov Bluff and 2.6 km northeast of Ezerets Knoll. British mapping in 1976.

== Maps ==
- Antarctic Digital Database (ADD). Scale 1:250000 topographic map of Antarctica. Scientific Committee on Antarctic Research (SCAR). Since 1993, regularly upgraded and updated.
- British Antarctic Territory. Scale 1:200000 topographic map. DOS 610 Series, Sheet W 66 64. Directorate of Overseas Surveys, Tolworth, UK, 1976.
