= Starski =

Starski is a surname. Notable people with the surname include:

- Allan Starski (born 1943), Polish production designer and set decorator
- Ludwik Starski (1903–1984), Polish Jewish lyricist

Starski is also the moniker of:

- Busy Bee Starski (born David Parker, 1962), American hip hop musician
- Lovebug Starski (born Kevin Smith, 1960–2018), American MC, musician and record producer

== See also ==
- Starsky (disambiguation)
- Zdarsky
