= Vieugué Island =

Island in Graham Land, Antarctica

- Location within Antarctica Location within Antarctic Peninsula

Geography
- Location: Antarctica
- Coordinates: 65°40′S 65°13′W

Administration
- Administered under the Antarctic Treaty System

Demographics
- Population: Uninhabited

Vieugué Island is an island 6 km (3 nmi) long at the west side of Grandidier Channel, lying 2 km (1 nmi) northwest of Duchaylard Island and 22 km (12 nmi) west-northwest of Cape Garcia, off the west coast of Graham Land. Discovered by the French Antarctic Expedition, 1903–05, and named by Charcot after Monsieur Vieugue, then French Charge d'Affaires at Buenos Aires.

== See also ==
- List of Antarctic and sub-Antarctic islands
