= Duchaylard Island =

Island in Graham Land, Antarctica

- Location within Antarctica Location within Antarctic Peninsula

Geography
- Location: Antarctica
- Coordinates: 65°42′S 65°7′W

Administration
- Administered under the Antarctic Treaty System

Demographics
- Population: Uninhabited

Duchaylard Island is an island 6 km (3 nmi) long at the west side of Grandidier Channel, lying 2 km (1 nmi) southeast of Vieugue Island and 19 km (10 nmi) west of Cape Garcia, off the west coast of Graham Land. It was discovered by the French Antarctic Expedition, 1903–05, and named by Jean-Baptiste Charcot for Monsieur du Chaylard, French Minister Plenipotentiary at Montevideo, Uruguay. The recommended spelling follows the form used in Maurice Bongrain's report of 1914 and is now firmly established.

== See also ==
- List of Antarctic and sub-Antarctic islands
