= Loqui Point =

Headland in Antarctica

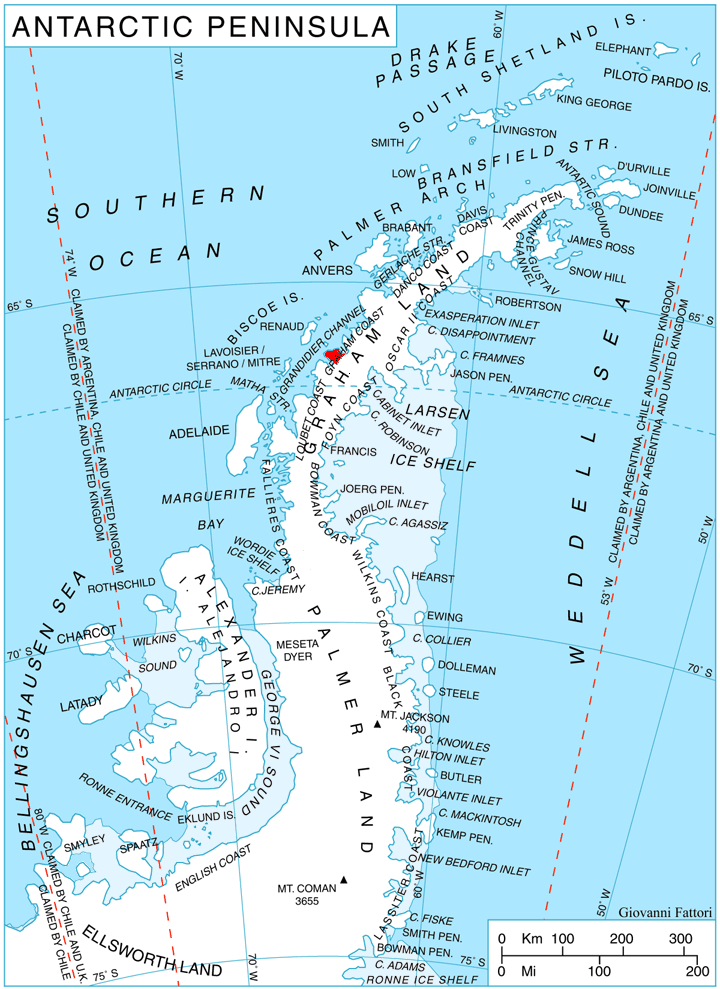
Location of Velingrad Peninsula on Graham Coast, Antarctic Peninsula.

Loqui Point (65°55′S 64°58′W) is a point at the northern extremity of Velingrad Peninsula on the west coast of Graham Land, Antarctica. It marks the south side of the entrance to Barilari Bay. This feature was discovered and named "Cap Garcia" by the French Antarctic Expedition, 1903–05, under Jean-Baptiste Charcot. At the same time Charcot gave the name "Cap Loqui" to the north cape of Barilari Bay, after a Captain Loqui of the Argentine Navy. The maps of Charcot's French Antarctic Expedition of 1908–10, showed "Cap Garcia" as the north cape of Barilari Bay, and the name Cape Garcia has since become established in that position. Charcot did not use the name "Cap Loqui" on the maps of the 1908–10 expedition, and with his shifting of the name Cape Garcia, this south entrance point to Barilari Bay had remained unnamed. For the sake of historical continuity, the name Loqui Point was accepted for this feature in the 1950s.
