= Dodunekov Bluff =

Mountain in Antarctica

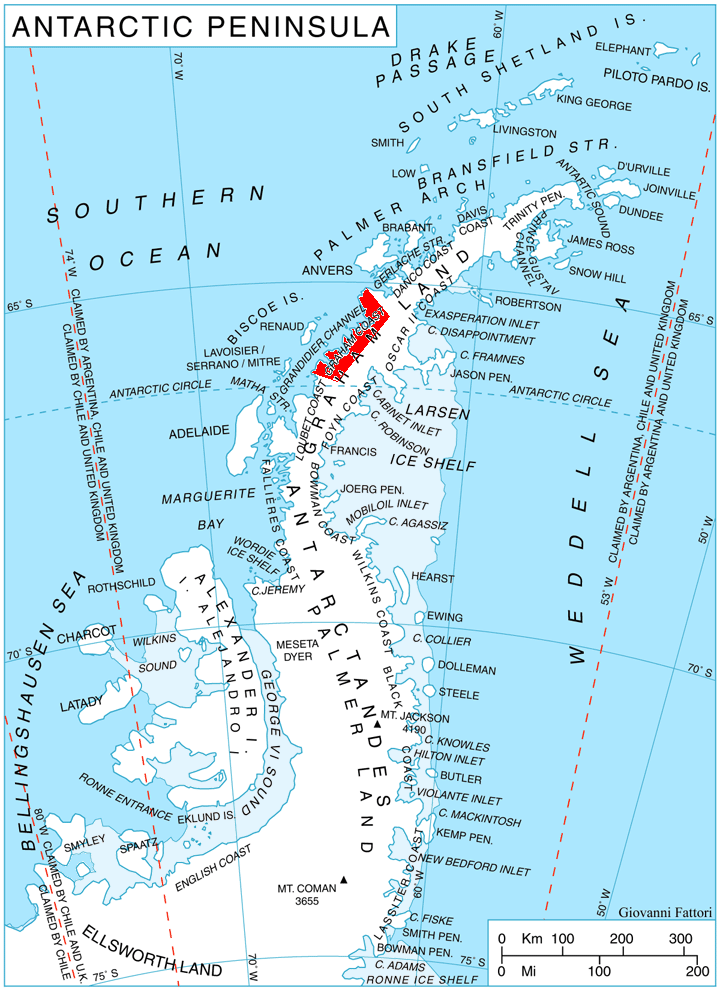
Location of Graham Coast on the Antarctic Peninsula.

Dodunekov Bluff (Bulgarian: Додунеков рид, romanized: Dodunekov rid, IPA: [doˈdunɛkov ˈrid]) is the ice-covered bluff rising to 1382 m in the west foothills of Bruce Plateau on Graham Coast in Graham Land, Antarctica. It has steep and partly ice-free southwest slopes, and surmounts Caulfield Glacier to the north and Rickmers Glacier to the south.

The peak is named after Stefan Dodunekov (1945-2012), for his support for the Bulgarian Antarctic topographic surveys and mapping.

== Location ==
Dodunekov Bluff is located at 66°11′23″S 64°53′52″W, which is 21.65 km east-southeast of Lens Peak, 12.77 km southeast of Coblentz Peak and 21 km north of Richardson Nunatak. British mapping in 1976.

== Maps ==
- Antarctic Digital Database (ADD). Scale 1:250000 topographic map of Antarctica. Scientific Committee on Antarctic Research (SCAR). Since 1993, regularly upgraded and updated.
- British Antarctic Territory. Scale 1:200000 topographic map. DOS 610 Series, Sheet W 66 64. Directorate of Overseas Surveys, Tolworth, UK, 1976.
