= Cloudburst Mountain =

Summit in British Columbia, Canada

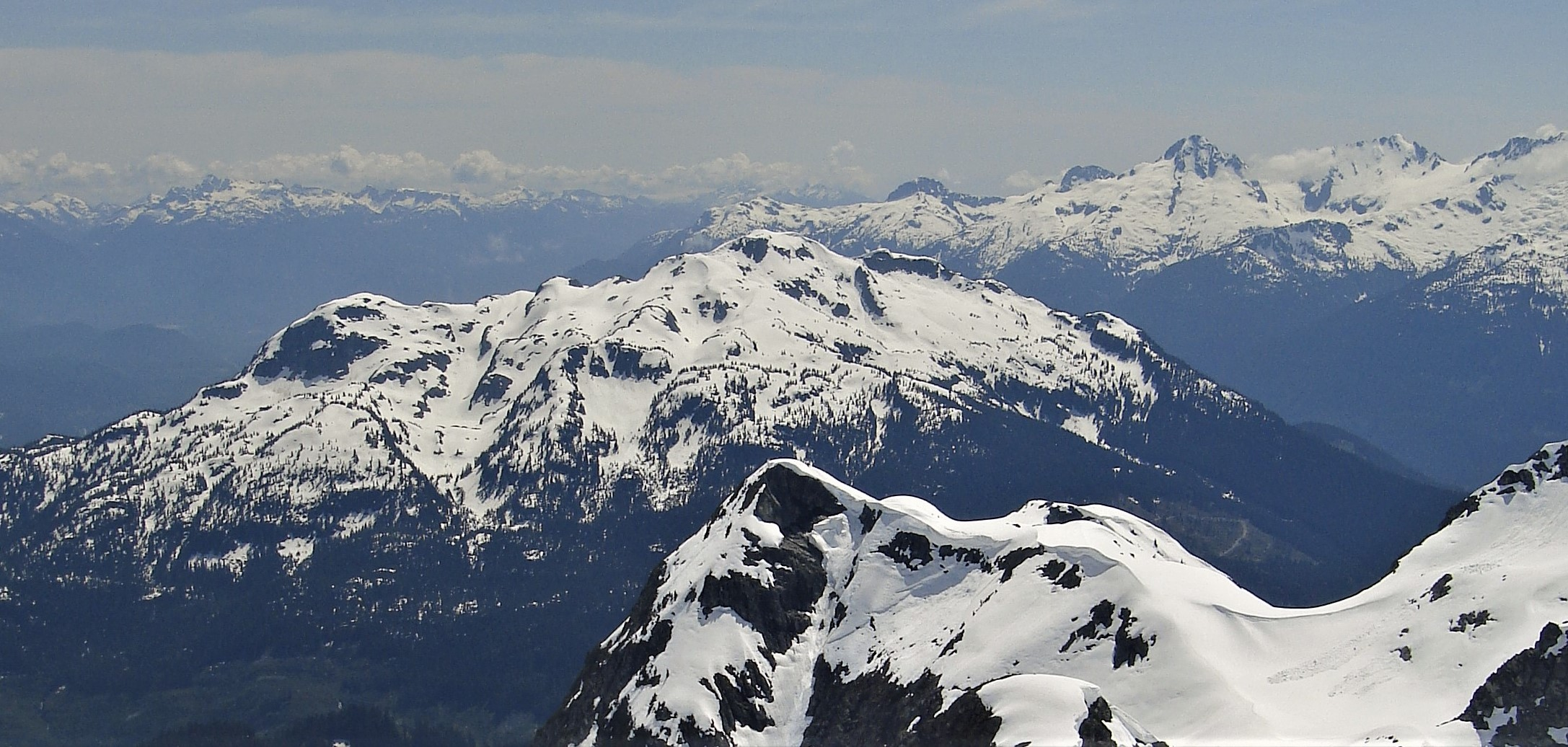
- North aspect, centered, from Tricouni Peak

Highest point
- Elevation: 1,871 m (6,138 ft)
- Prominence: 1,049 m (3,442 ft)
- Parent peak: Tricouni Peak (2,122 m)
- Isolation: 7.13 km (4.43 mi)
- Listing: Mountains of British Columbia
- Coordinates: 49°56′01″N 123°14′10″W

Naming
- Etymology: Cloudburst

Geography
- Location within British Columbia Location within Canada
- Interactive map of Cloudburst Mountain
- Country: Canada
- Province: British Columbia
- District: New Westminster Land District
- Parent range: Coast Mountains
- Topo map: NTS 92G14 Cheakamus River

Climbing
- Easiest route: scrambling

Cloudburst Mountain is a summit in British Columbia, Canada.

== Description ==
Cloudburst Mountain is a prominent 1,871-meter-elevation (6,138-foot) peak located in the Coast Mountains, 26 kilometers (16 miles) north of Squamish and 8.9 kilometers (5.5 miles) south of line parent Tricouni Peak. The mountain rises alongside Highway 99, also known as the Sea to Sky Highway, approximately midway between Squamish and Whistler. Precipitation runoff from the peak drains west into the Squamish River, and east into the Cheakamus River. Cloudburst Mountain is more notable for its steep rise above local terrain than for its absolute elevation. Topographic relief is significant as the summit rises 1,800 meters (5,900 feet) above the Squamish Valley in four kilometers (2.5 miles). The mountain's toponym was officially adopted December 12, 1939, by the Geographical Names Board of Canada.

== Climate ==
Based on the Köppen climate classification, Cloudburst Mountain is located in the marine west coast climate zone of western North America. Most weather fronts originate in the Pacific Ocean, and travel east toward the Coast Mountains where they are forced upward by the range (Orographic lift), causing them to drop their moisture in the form of rain or snowfall. As a result, the Coast Mountains experience high precipitation, especially during the winter months in the form of snowfall. Temperatures in winter can drop below −20 °C with wind chill factors below −30 °C

== Gallery ==
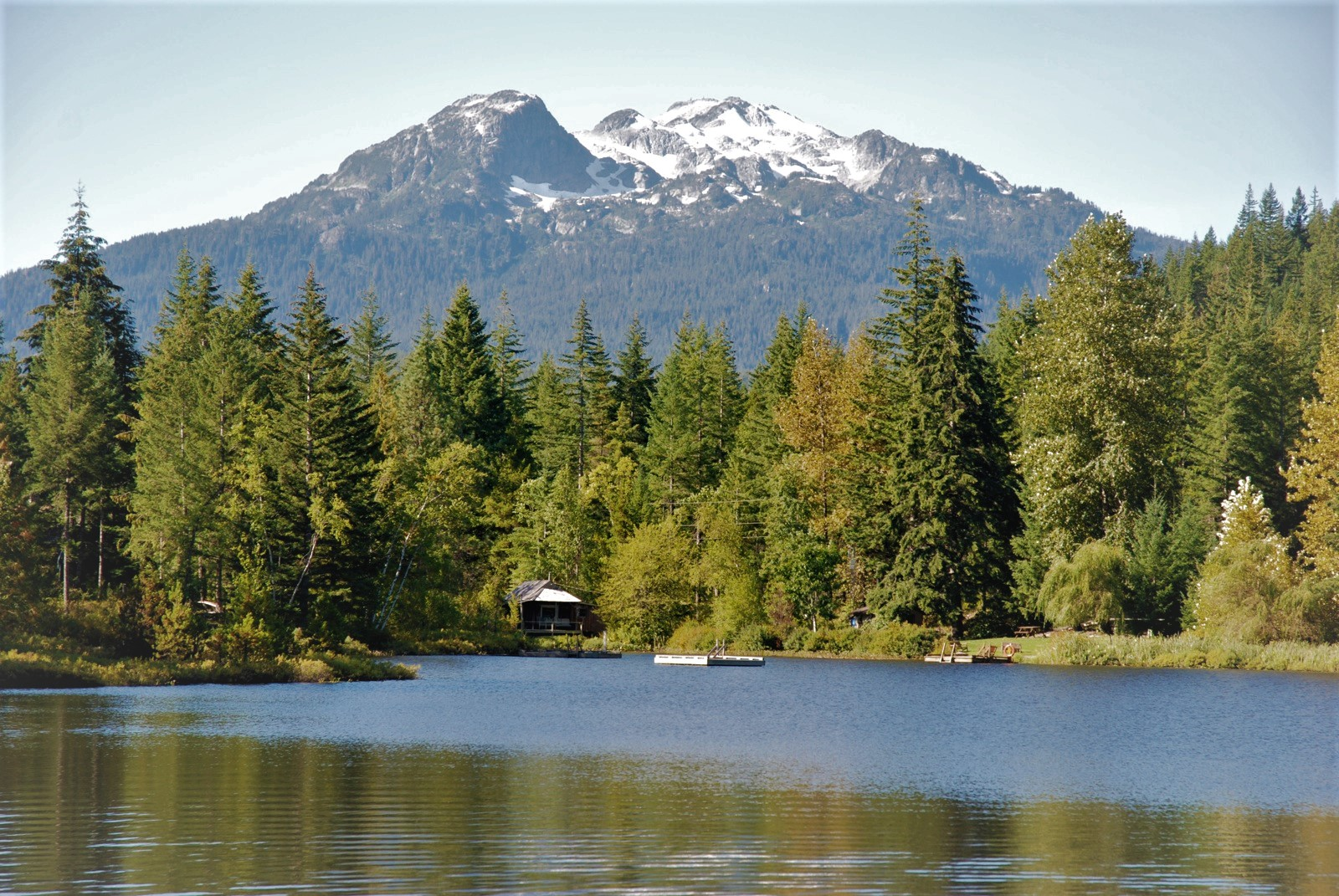
Cloudburst Mountain beyond Pinecrest Lake

== See also ==
- Geography of British Columbia
