= Prestoy Point =

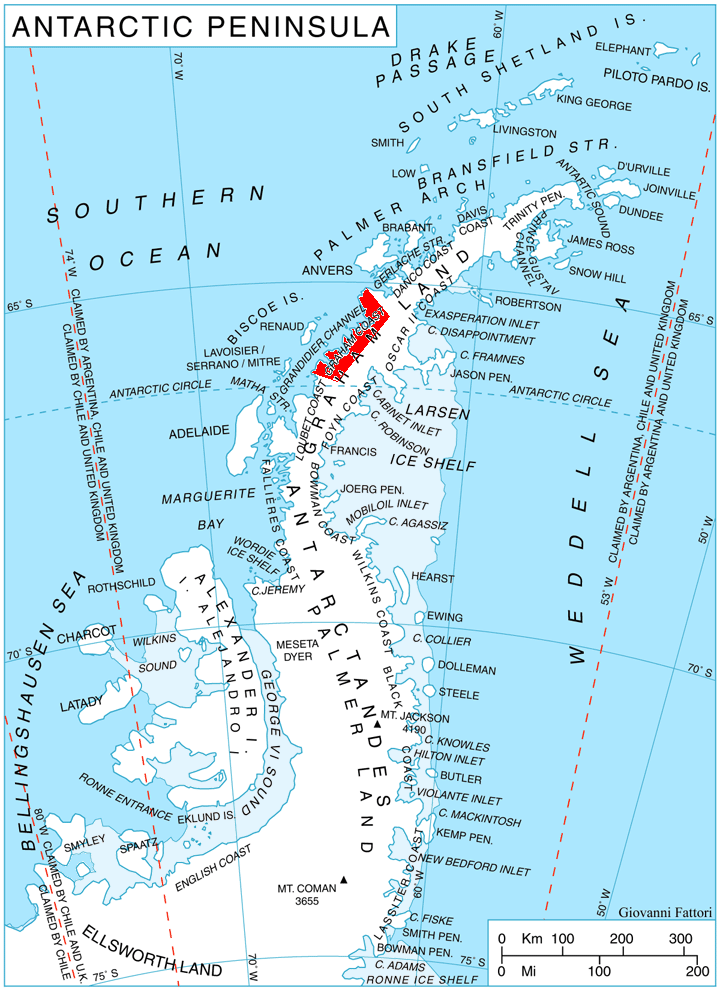
Location of Graham Coast on the Antarctic Peninsula.

Prestoy Point (Bulgarian: нос Престой, ‘Nos Prestoy’ \'nos pre-'stoy\) is the sharp point projecting 800 m into the head of Barilari Bay on the Graham Coast in Graham Land, Antarctica, formed by an offshoot of Mount Genecand. The point is named after the settlement of Prestoy in northern Bulgaria.

== Location ==
Prestoy Point is located at 66°02′05″S 64°38′41″W, 11.3 km southeast of Vorweg Point, 14.5 km south-southwest of Duyvis Point and 8.4 km north by west of the summit point of Mount Genecand. It was mapped by the British in 1976.

== Maps ==
- Antarctic Digital Database (ADD). Scale 1:250000 topographic map of Antarctica. Scientific Committee on Antarctic Research (SCAR), 1993–2016.
- British Antarctic Territory. Scale 1:200000 topographic map. DOS 610 Series, Sheet W 66 64. Directorate of Overseas Surveys, Tolworth, UK, 1976.
