= Index Peak =

Mountain in Antarctica

Index Peak (65°49′S 64°26′W) is a peak over 1,220 metres (4,000 ft) high, standing 7.5 miles (12 km) southeast of Cape Garcia on the west coast of Graham Land, Antarctica. It was mapped by the Falkland Islands Dependencies Survey from photos taken by Hunting Aerosurveys Ltd in 1956–57, and so named by the UK Antarctic Place-Names Committee because the peak resembles an index finger.
