= Coblentz Peak =

Mountain in Antarctica

Coordinates: 66°7′S 65°8′W

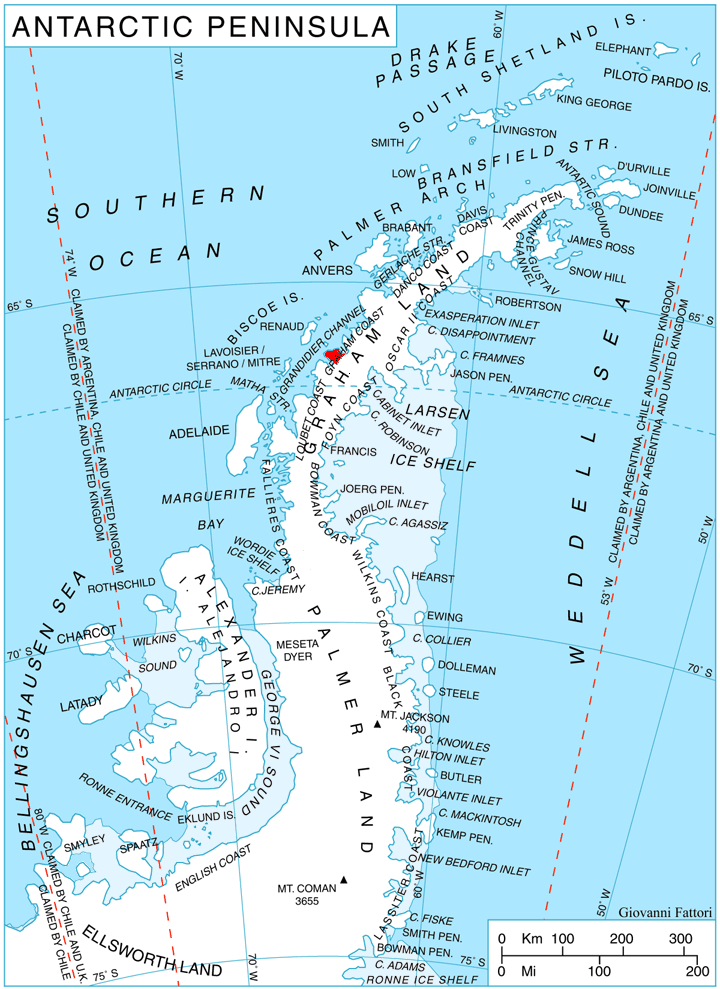
Location of Velingrad Peninsula on Graham Coast, Antarctic Peninsula.

Coblentz Peak is a peak rising at the north side of the head of Holtedahl Bay, in Chiren Heights, Velingrad Peninsula, on the west coast of Graham Land in Antarctica. It was photographed by Hunting Aerosurveys Ltd in 1956–57 and was mapped from these photos by the Falkland Islands Dependencies Survey. It was named by the UK Antarctic Place-Names Committee in 1959 for William W. Coblentz of the U.S. National Bureau of Standards, whose work on the transmissive properties of tinted glass has contributed to the design of satisfactory snow goggles.
