= Tricouni =

Brand name of a metal nail used on mountain climbing shoes

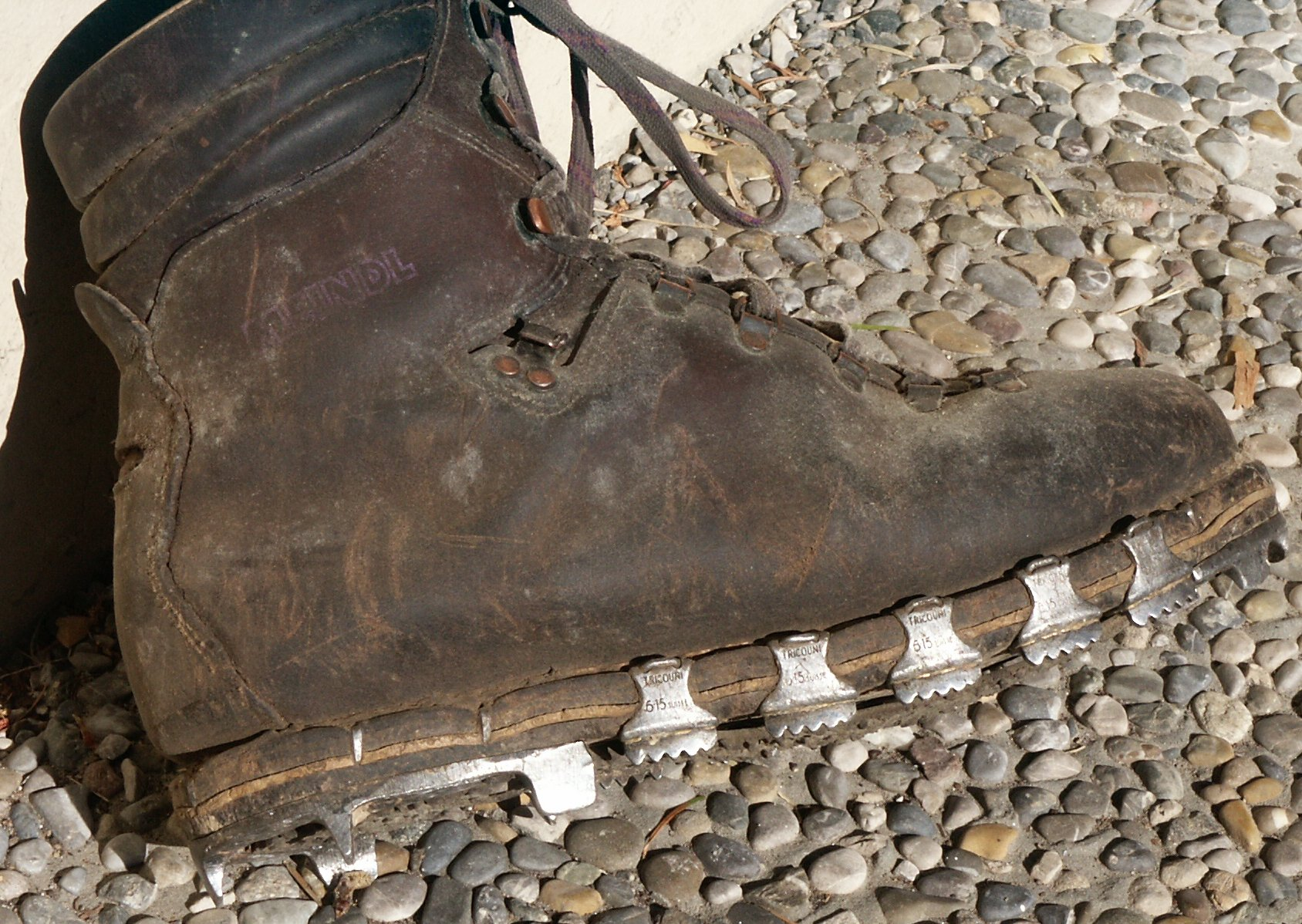
Mountain boot with Tricouni nails

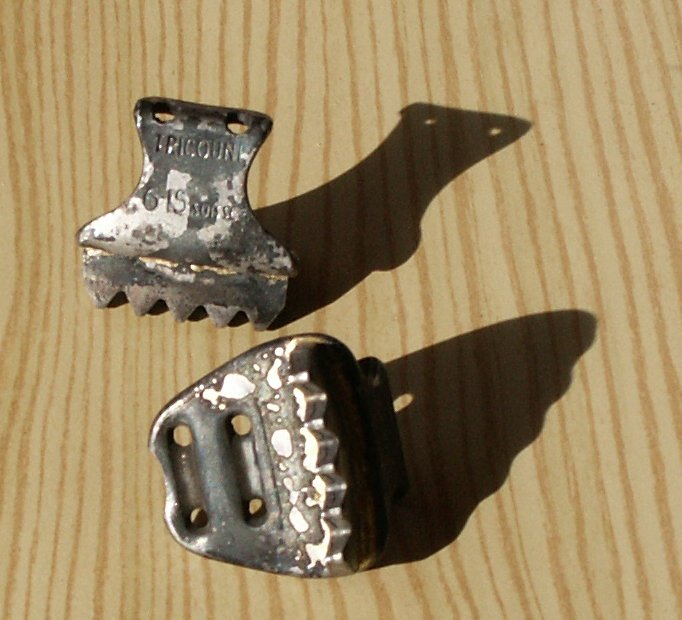
Tricouni nails

Tricouni is the brand name of a metal nail used on mountain climbing shoes. Widely used in the past by mountain climbers and soldiers, it offers improved gripping on various surfaces. The Tricouni nail was invented in 1912 by a jeweler from Geneva, Félix-Valentin Genecand, alias "Tricouni" (1878–1957). Genecand was also a well known alpinist (several mountains were named after him: Mount Genecand in Antarctica, Tricouni Peak in Canada). Tricouni nails are also referred to as hobnails, boot nails, cleats and shoe studs.

== See also ==
- Crampons
- Cleats
