= Simler Snowfield =

Coordinates: 66°3′S 65°5′W

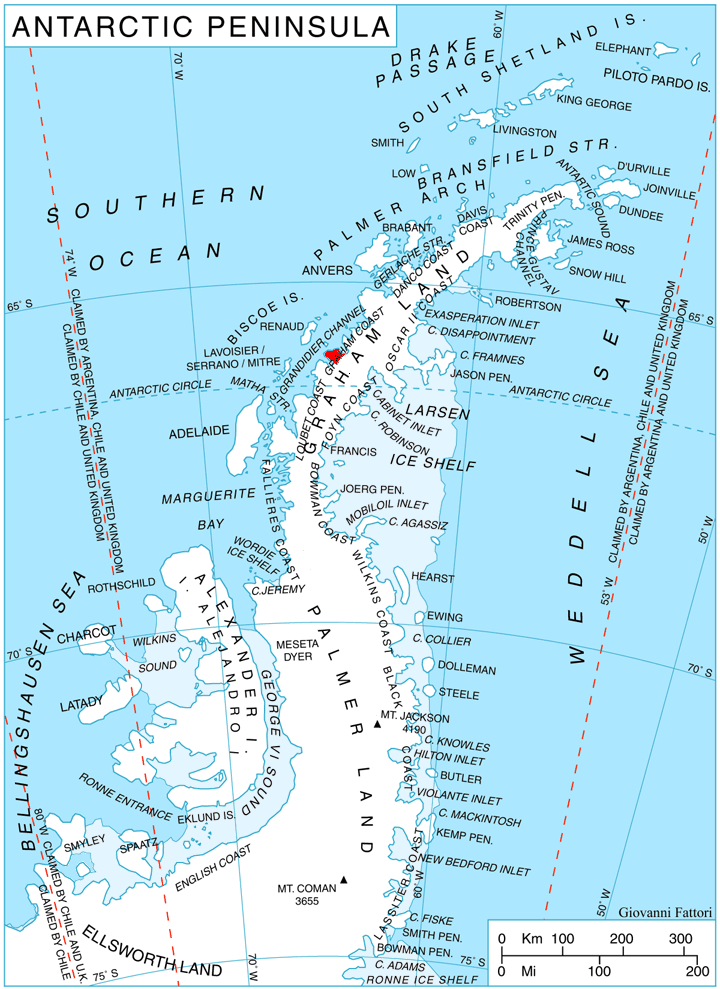
Location of Velingrad Peninsula on Graham Coast, Antarctic Peninsula.

Simler Snowfield is a snowfield lying northeast of Holtedahl Bay, on Velingrad Peninsula, the west coast of Graham Land in Antarctica. Photographed by Hunting Aerosurveys Ltd. in 1956–57, and mapped from these photos by the Falkland Islands Dependencies Survey (FIDS). Named by the United Kingdom Antarctic Place-Names Committee (UK-APC) in 1959 for Josias Simler (1530–76), who wrote the first reasonable advice on precautions for travel on glaciers, in 1574.
