= Mount Cheops =

Mountain in Graham Land, Antarctica

Mount Cheops (65°52′S 64°38′W) is a mountain, over 610 metres (2,000 ft) high, standing 8 nautical miles (15 km) south-southeast of Cape Garcia on the west coast of Graham Land. It was mapped by the Falkland Islands Dependencies Survey from photos taken by Hunting Aerosurveys Ltd in 1956–57, and named by the UK Antarctic Place-Names Committee after the Great Pyramid of Giza (also known as the Pyramid of Cheops) because of its distinctive shape.
