= Cloudburst (disambiguation) =

A cloudburst is an extreme case of rainfall.

Cloudburst may also refer to:

- Cloudburst (1951 film), a 1951 film by Francis Searle
- Cloudburst (2011 film), a 2011 Canadian film
- Cloudburst, a company founded by NFL player Steve Wright that provides sideline misting systems
- Cloudburst (G.I. Joe), a fictional character in the G.I. Joe universe
- Cloudburst (Whitacre), a musical composition by Eric Whitacre
- "Cloudburst", a song by Oasis from their single "Live Forever"
- Cloudburst, an album by Jon Hendricks
- Cloudburst, the final movement of Ferde Grofé's Grand Canyon Suite
- Cloudbursting, a phenomenon in cloud computing
- Cloud Burst, a televised story for schools, as part of the BBC Television series Look and Read, first broadcast in 1974
- Cloudburst Mountain, a mountain in Canada
