= Starsky (disambiguation) =

David Starsky is a main character in the 1970s TV series Starsky & Hutch and its spin-offs.

Starsky may also refer to:

- Morris Starsky (1933–1989), American philosopher and activist
- Starsky Wilson (born 1976), Black activist
- Starsky Robotics, an autonomous trucking company

== See also ==
- Starski, a similar surname
- Zdarsky, a similar surname
