= Zdarsky =

Zdarsky is a surname. Notable people with the name include:

- Chip Zdarsky (born 1975), Canadian comics creator
- Mathias Zdarsky (1856–1940), Austrian skier
- Robert Z'Dar (born Robert J. Zdarsky; 1950–2015), American actor and filmmaker
- Dorothy H. Rose (born Dorothy Zdarsky; 1920–2005), American politician from New York

== See also ==
- Mount Zdarsky, a mountain in Antarctica
- Starsky (disambiguation)
