= Ezerets, Dobrich Province =

Ezerets
- Village
- Location in Bulgaria
- Coordinates: 43.595°N 28.536°E
- Country: Bulgaria
- Province: Dobrich Province
- Municipality: Shabla
- Time zone: UTC+2 (EET)
  - Summer (DST): UTC+3 (EEST)

Ezerets is a village in Shabla Municipality, Dobrich Province, northeastern Bulgaria.

Ezerets Knoll on Graham Land, Antarctica is named after the village.
