= Bilgeri Glacier =

Glacier in Antarctica

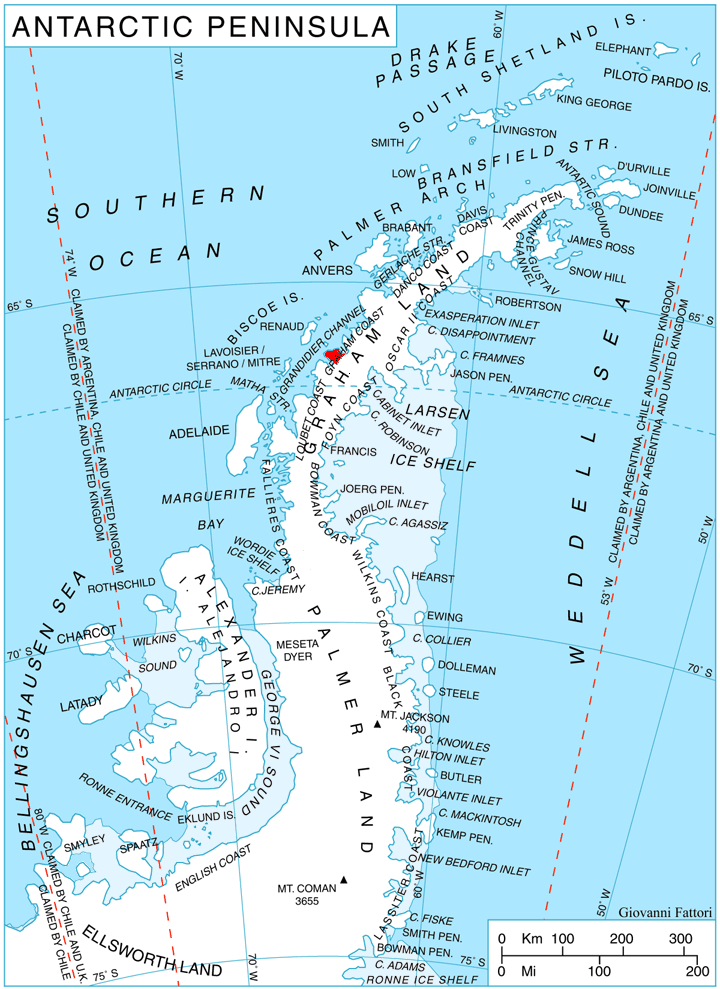
- Location of Velingrad Peninsula on Graham Coast, Antarctic Peninsula

- Location within Antarctica
- Location: Graham Land
- Coordinates: 66°1′00″S 64°47′00″W
- Thickness: unknown
- Highest elevation: 409 m (1,342 ft)
- Terminus: Barilari Bay
- Status: unknown

Bilgeri Glacier (66°1′S 64°47′W) is a glacier flowing into Barilari Bay south of Huitfeldt Point and west of Byaga Point, on Velingrad Peninsula on the west coast of Graham Land in Antarctica. It was charted by the British Graham Land Expedition under John Rymill, 1934–37, and named by the UK Antarctic Place-Names Committee in 1959 for Georg Bilgeri (1873–1934), Austrian pioneer exponent of skiing, inventor of the first spring ski binding, and author of one of the earliest skiing manuals.

== See also ==
- List of glaciers in the Antarctic
- Glaciology
