= Chiren (village) =

Chiren Чирен
- Location of Chiren
- Coordinates: 43°19′N 23°34′E
- Country: Bulgaria
- Provinces (Oblast): Vratsa Province

Government
  - Mayor: Dian Damyanov
- Elevation: 300 m (980 ft)

Population (13/09/2005)
  - Total: 812
- Time zone: UTC+2 (EET)
  - Summer (DST): UTC+3 (EEST)
- Postal Code: 3050
- Area code: 09115

Chiren (Bulgarian: Чирен) is a village located in northwestern Bulgaria. It is a part of Vratsa Municipality, Vratsa Province.

== Geography ==
The village is located approximately 15 kilometers to the north of town of Vratsa. Chiren is popular with places "Bojia most" (Bulgarian: Божия мост 'God's bridge') and "Tigancheto" (Bulgarian: Тиганчето 'little frying pan'). These places are natural forms carved by the rivers. The other natural landmark in this area is the cave "Ponora" (Bulgarian: Понора).

== Honour ==
Chiren Heights in Graham Land, Antarctica are named after the village.
