= Georg Bilgeri =

Austrian military officer and ski pioneer (1873 – 1934)

Colonel Georg Bilgeri
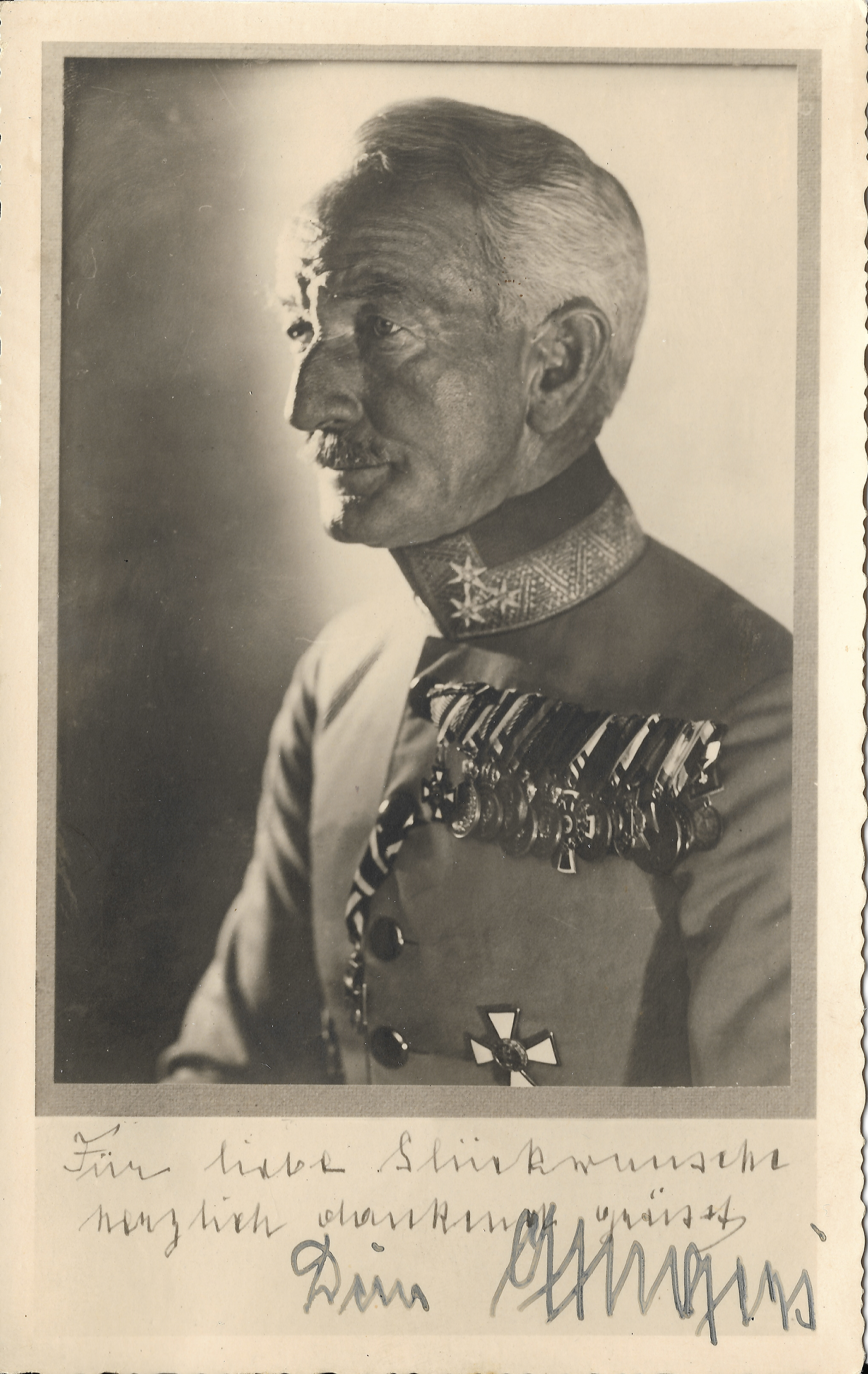
- Born: October 11, 1873; Bregenz, Austria-Hungary
- Died: December 4, 1934 (aged 61); Patscherkofel, Federal State of Austria
- Burial place: St. Gallus Cemetery, Bregenz
- Military career
- Allegiance: Austria-Hungary
- Branch: Austro-Hungarian Army
- Service years: 1894–1920
- Rank: Oberst
- Conflicts: World War I
- Other work: Gendarmerie, ski school

Georg Bilgeri (11 October 1873 – 4 December 1934) was an officer in the Austro–Hungarian Army, mountaineer, and Austrian pioneer of skiing. Bilgeri learned to ski in Gargellen about 1893.

== Military career ==
As a Lieutenant in the Tyrolean Imperial Hunters (Tiroler Kaiserjäger Regiment No. 4), Bilgeri instituted ski training in the high Alps as early as 1896 and became the creator of mountain and ski training in the Austro-Hungarian army. Bilgeri led military patrols in winter treks in the Zillertal Alps (1899) and to Kitzbühel (1905). From 1905-08 he led instructor courses for officers. Bilgeri directed a military ski factory in Salzburg from 1906-10. In 1908-09 he was a commander of border guards in the Dolomites. He was an officer of the World War I National Defense Command in Tyrol, leading the formation and training of the Mountain guide companies. He retired in 1920 with the rank of Lieutenant Colonel, and later was awarded Colonel.

== Alpine ski instructor ==
He provided free ski instruction in Austria (starting 1906), Sweden, Switzerland, Hungary and Turkey and wrote an early ski manual advocating the use of two shorter ski poles, Der alpine Skilauf (1910). Bilgeri was involved with the creation of the Salzburg Ski Club in 1910. Starting in 1919 he was a member of the Swiss Alpine Club. He devised improvements to mountain boot shoelace fasteners, crampons, ice axes, anti-slip skins, collapsible ski poles, ski wax, ski bindings, rucksacks, and crevasse rescue. He provided ski training for the police and customs starting in 1921. The first Alpine manual for the Austrian gendarmerie was published in 1927, which had been developed by Bilgeri and Colonel Josef Albert. In 1930 he founded a ski school at Patscherkofel in the Tyrol.

== Works ==
Der alpine Skilauf München: Deutsche Alpenzeitung, 1910

Alpine Weisungen für den Gebirgskrieg Verlag K. u. K. Landesverteidigungs-Kondo in Tirol, 1917

Alpin-Vorschrift für die österr. Bundesgendarmerie: nebst einem Anhang über die Zentralmeldestelle für alpine Unfälle in Wien und der Instruktion für alpine Rettungspatrouillen des Bundesheeres Wien: Gendarmerie-Zentraldirektion, 1927

Méthode Bilgeri pour l'Enseignement du Ski Swiss Alpine Club Lausanne: F. Rouge & Cie S.A., 1931

Alpiner Skilauf Skihochtouren Bregenz: Bilgeri-Werk, 1934

== Legacy ==
- Popularized Alpine skiing through his teaching, providing instruction to reportedly more than 40,000 pupils
- 1926 awarded Golden Badge of Honor from the Swedish Ski Association
- 1927 Honorary member of Ski Club of Great Britain
- 1937 memorial stone erected at Patscherkofel
- 1984 commemorative plaque at his birthplace

The following have been named after him:

- Crevasse rescue technique using multiple ropes
- Bilgeri Glacier in Grahamland Antarctica
- Kommandogebäude Oberst Bilgeri
- Hauptmann-Bilgeri-Steig trail on Monte Piano in the Dolomites
- Innsbruck-Igls, Bregenz street and hotel as well as roads in Horbranz, Voralberg and Mariazell, Styria
- 1950 challenge trophy in cross-country skiing
- 1959 Georg-Bilgeri-Straße in Vienna Donaustadt (22nd district)

== See also ==
- Mathias Zdarsky
- Luis Trenker
