= Huitfeldt Point =

Headland in Antarctica

Coordinates: 65°59′S 64°44′W

Huitfeldt Point is a point southeast of Vorweg Point on the southwest side of Barilari Bay, on the west coast of Graham Land, Antarctica. It was charted by the British Graham Land Expedition under John Rymill, 1934–37, and was named by the UK Antarctic Place-Names Committee in 1959 for Fritz R. Huitfeldt, a Norwegian pioneer ski exponent, the author of one of the earliest skiing manuals, and the designer of the Huitfeldt ski binding, for long the standard binding.
