= Weir Glacier =

Glacier in Graham Land, Antarctica

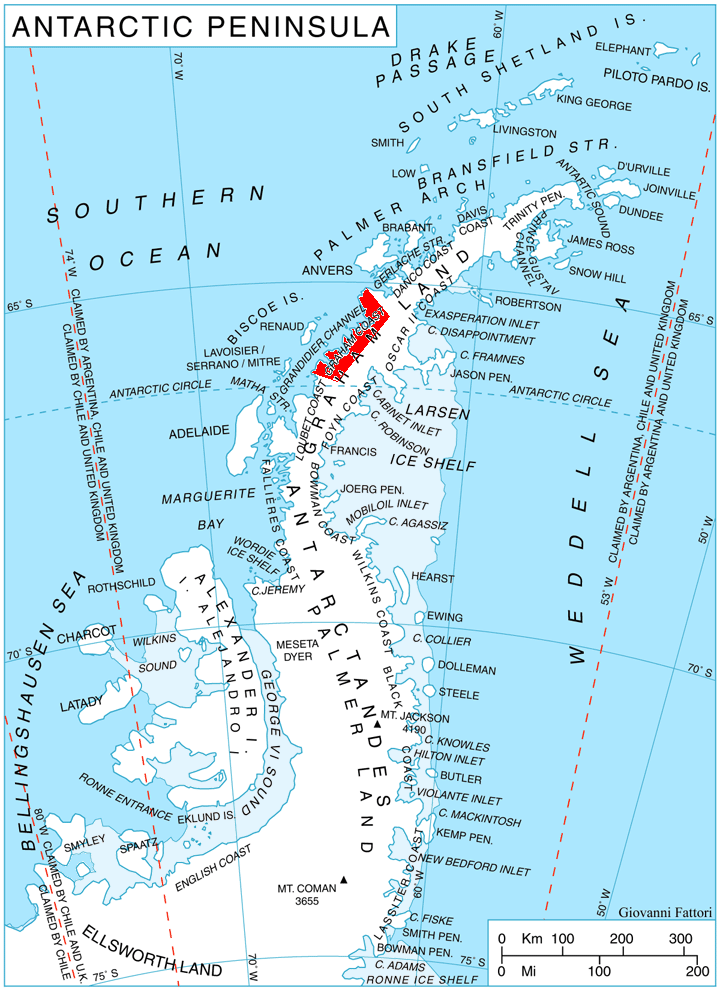
Location of Graham Coast on the Antarctic Peninsula.

Weir Glacier (66°4′S 64°42′W) is a glacier 8 nautical miles (15 km) long, flowing north into the south part of Barilari Bay between Prestoy Point and Byaga Point, on the west coast of Graham Land. First sighted and roughly charted in 1909 by the French Antarctic Expedition under Charcot. It was surveyed in 1935-36 by the British Graham Land Expedition (BGLE) under Rymill and later named for William D. Weir, 1st Viscount Weir of Eastwood, and his son, the Hon. James K. Weir, who contributed toward the cost of the BGLE, 1934–37.
