= Chiren (Nostradamus) =

Person who appears in predictions by Nostradamus

Chiren, also spelled Chyren and named as Selin and Seline, is a person who appears in the predictions of Nostradamus. Chiren would be a European, presumably from France. The arrival of this person would coincide with a great war bringing several decades of suffering. A man with a black frizzy beard would be an enemy of Chiren. According to Nostradamus, Chiren would eventually reign as a world leader and ensure long-lasting world peace.

== Predictions ==
The names Chiren, Chyren, Selin and Seline are mentioned several times in Nostradamus' work Les Prophéties. The table below shows the cryptic verses in which the names appear. The translations are based on various interpretations of the original texts.

Century II, Quatrain 79
The man with the black frizzy beard, Will subdue the cruel and savage people: The great Chiren shall from afar, Free all captives under the banner of Seline.	La barbe crespe et noire par engin, Subiuguera la gent cruelle et fiere: Le grand Chiren ostera du longin, Tous les captifs par Seline baniere.
Century IV, Quatrain 34
The great one captured from a foreign land, Chained with gold, is offered to King Chyren: He who will lose the war in Ausonia and Milan, And whose whole army is left to fire and sword.	Le grand mené captif d'estrange terre, D'or enchainé au Roy Chyren offert: Qui dans Ausone, Milan perdra la guerre, Et tout son ost mis à feu et à fer.
Century VI, Quatrain 27
Within the Isles of five rivers to one, Through the expansion of the great Chyren Selin, Through the drizzles in the air the fury of one, Six escaped, hidden bundles of flax.	Dedans les Isles de cinq fleuves a un, Par le croissant du grand Chyren Selin, Par les bruynes de l'air fureur de l'un, Six eschapez, chachez fardeaux de lin.
Century VI, Quatrain 42
To Logmyon will be handed the rule, Of the great Selin, who will perform even greater deeds: Over all Italy he will spread his banner, Ruled by a clever opponent.	A Logmyon sera laissé le regne, Du grand Selin plus fera de faict: Par les Itales estendra son enseigne, Regi sera par prudent contrefaict.
Century VI, Quatrain 70
The great Chiren will be the leader of the world, In addition, he will be loved, feared and dreaded: His fame and praise will surpass the heavens, And he will be well satisfied with the single title of victor.	Au chef du monde le grand Chyren sera, Plus outre, apres ayme, craint, redoute: Son bruit et los les cieux sur passera, Et du seul titre Victeur, fort content.
Century VI, Quatrain 77
The Italian monarch Selin peacefully, All empires united under the Christian king of the world, When he is dying, he will be buried in the land of the blessed, After having driven the pirates from the sea.	Selin monarque l'Italie pacifique, Regnes unis Roy Chrestien du monde, Mourrant voudra coucher en terre blesique, Apres pyrates avoir chassé de l'onde.
Century VIII, Quatrain 54
Under the guise of a marriage treaty, Does the great Chyren, Selin, perform a noble act, Quintin and Arras wins him over again on his travels, A second massacre is committed by the Spaniards.	Soubs la couleur du traicté mariage, Fait magnanime par grand Chyren Selin, Quintin, Arras recouurez au voyage, D'espagnols fait second banc macelin.
Century IX, Quatrain 41
The great Chyren takes hold of Avignon, From Rome come honeyed letters full of bitterness, A letter of envoy goes out from Canino, Carpentras is taken by a black duke with a red feather.	Le grand Chyren soy saisir d'Auignom, De Rome lettres en miel plein d'amertume, Lettre ambassade partir de Chanignon, Carpentras prins par duc noir rouge plume.

== Literature ==
- Nostradamus. (2007). The Complete Prophecies of Nostradamus. Wilder Publications. ISBN 9781604590623.
- Nostradamus, M., & Allgeier, K. (1994). De complete verzen van Nostradamus: De originele teksten, vertaling en toelichting op de voorspellingen (in Dutch). Elmar. ISBN 9789038902678.
