= Cypress Peak =

Mountain in British Columbia, Canada

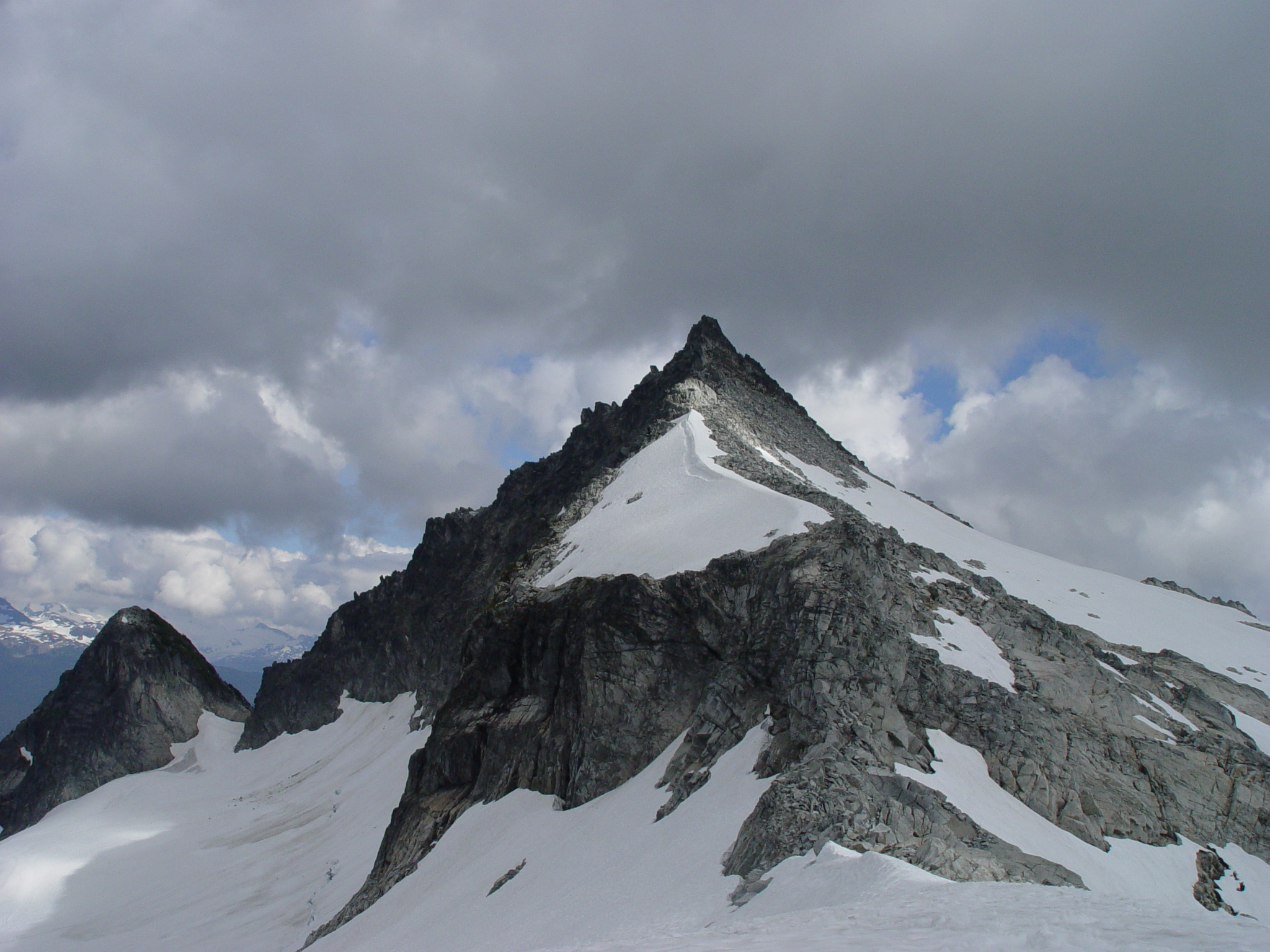
- Cypress Peak, July 2005

Highest point
- Elevation: 2,083 m (6,834 ft)
- Prominence: 265 m (869 ft)
- Listing: Mountains of British Columbia
- Coordinates: 50°02′08″N 123°15′11″W

Geography
- Location within British Columbia
- Interactive map of Cypress Peak
- Location: British Columbia, Canada
- District: New Westminster Land District
- Parent range: Pacific Ranges
- Topo map: NTS 92J3 Brandywine Falls

Cypress Peak is a mountain peak south of Brandywine Mountain on the Squamish-Cheakamus divide, west of Whistler in the New Westminster Land District of British Columbia, Canada. The mountain was named after nearby Cypress Creek (which has since been renamed Roe Creek).

== Climate ==
Based on the Köppen climate classification, Cypress Peak is located in the marine west coast climate zone of western North America. Most weather fronts originate in the Pacific Ocean, and travel east toward the Coast Mountains where they are forced upward by the range (Orographic lift), causing them to drop their moisture in the form of rain or snowfall. As a result, the Coast Mountains experience high precipitation, especially during the winter months in the form of snowfall. Temperatures can drop below −20 °C with wind chill factors below −30 °C. The months July through September offer the most favorable weather for climbing Cypress Peak.

== Gallery ==
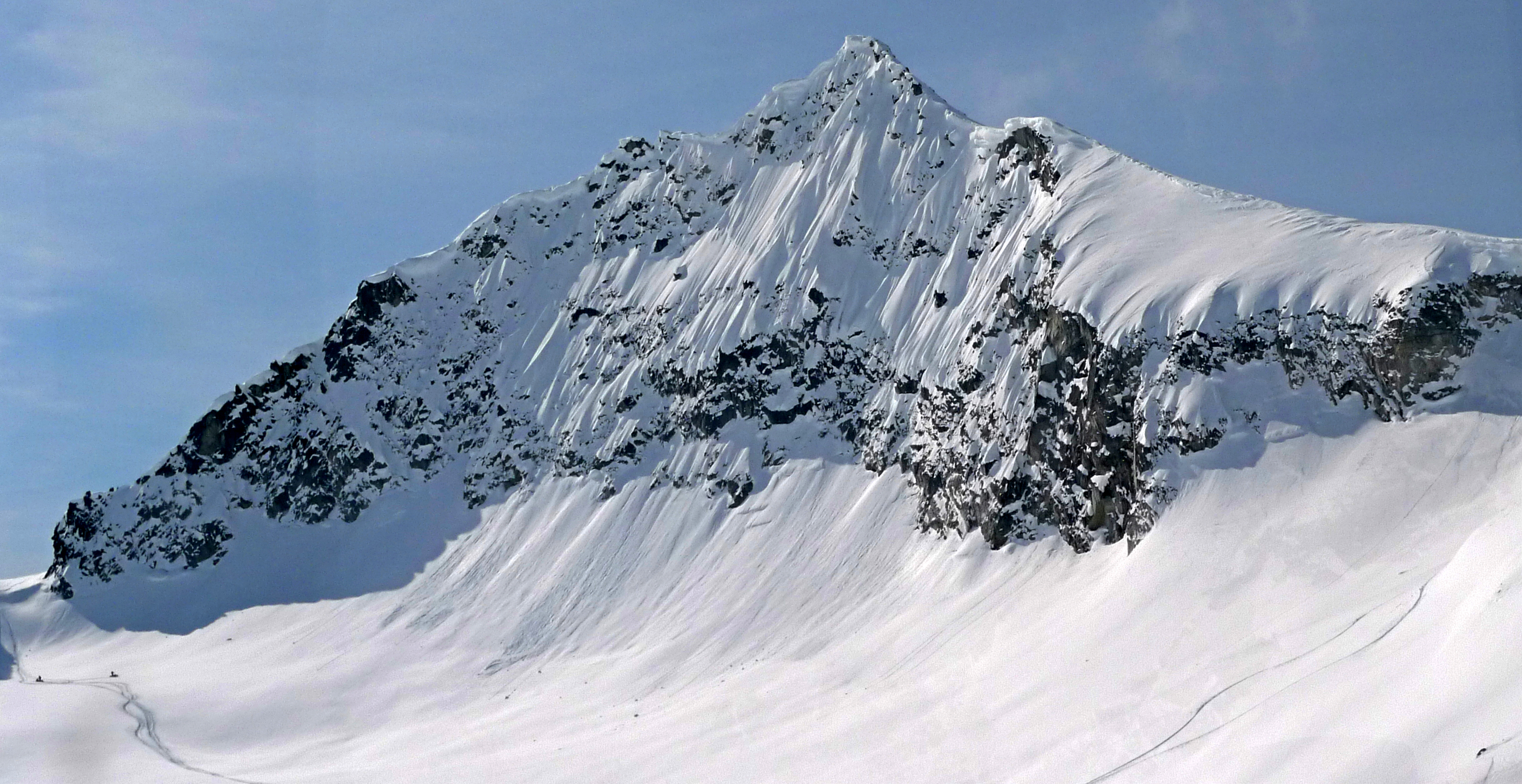
Cypress Peak

== See also ==
- Geography of British Columbia
- Geology of British Columbia
