= Richardson Nunatak =

Mountain in Antarctica

Richardson Nunatak (66°22′S 64°56′W) is a nunatak in the southern part of Hugi Glacier, in Graham Land, Antarctica. Photographed by Hunting Aerosurveys Ltd. in 1955–57, and mapped from these photos by the Falkland Islands Dependencies Survey (FIDS). Named by the United Kingdom Antarctic Place-Names Committee (UK-APC) in 1959 for E.C. Richardson (1871–1954), the "father of British skiing," one of the principal founders and first secretary of the Ski Club of Great Britain.
