= Tricouni Peak =

Mountain in British Columbia, Canada

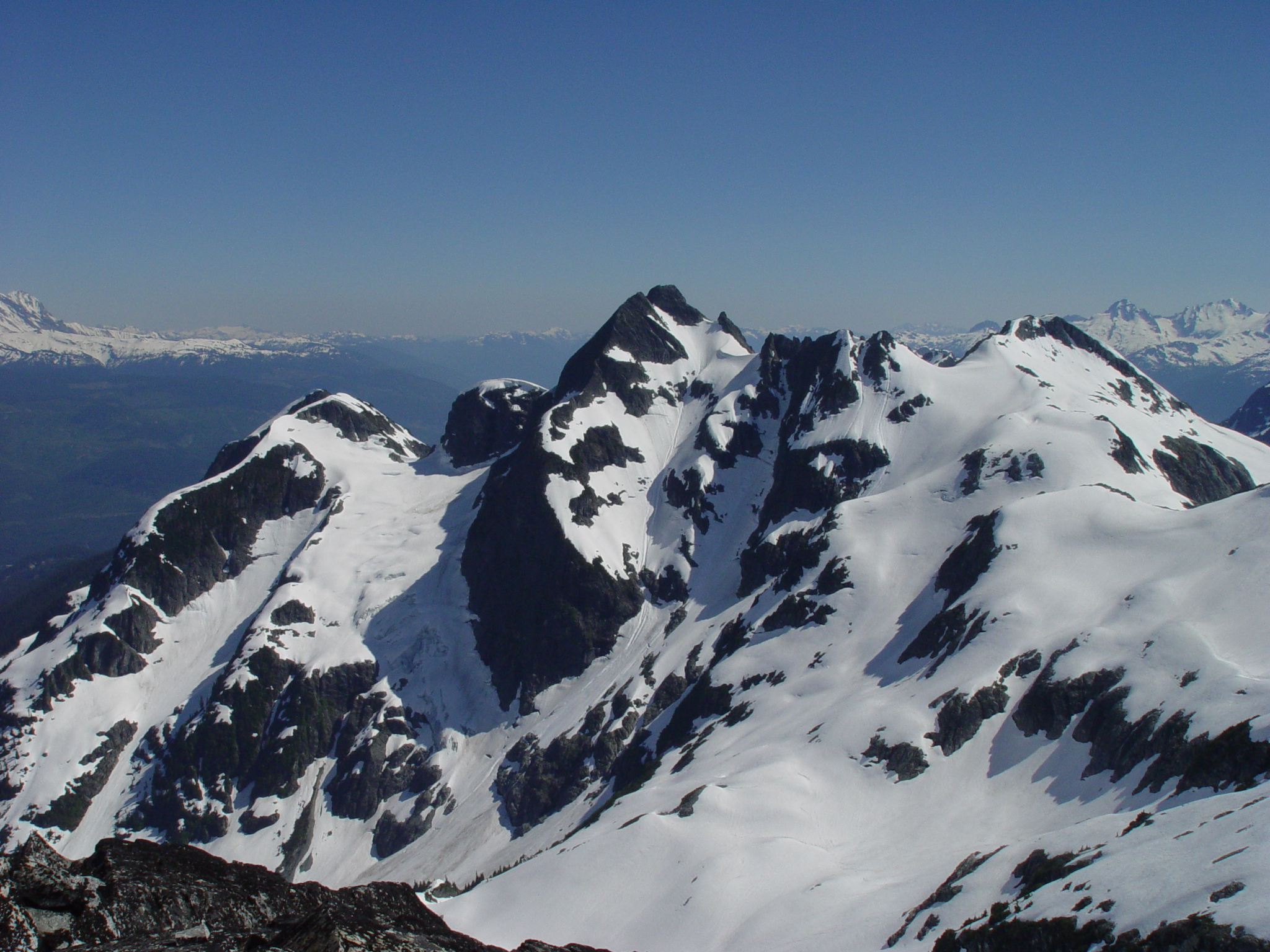

Highest point
- Elevation: 2,122 m (6,962 ft)
- Prominence: 252 m (827 ft)
- Isolation: 7.75 km (4.82 mi)
- Coordinates: 50°00′49.4388″N 123°14′41.0598″W

Geography
- Location within British Columbia Location within Canada
- Country: Canada
- Province: British Columbia
- District: New Westminster Land District
- Parent range: Pacific Ranges
- Topo map: NTS 92J3 Brandywine Falls

Climbing
- First ascent: 1931 J. Cherry; T. Fyles; H. Wynne
- Easiest route: rock/ice climb

Tricouni Peak is a mountain located south of Cypress Peak on the Squamish-Cheakamus divide within the Pacific Ranges of the Coast Mountains in southwestern British Columbia, Canada. It was named in 1931 by Tom Fyles et al., the first ascent party. According to Tom Fyles himself, "Tricouni Mountain was the name suggested for the peak, as from a distance it had the appearance of three cones". A misinterpreted "resemblance to a 3-pointed tricouni boot nail" was mentioned only much later, and not by Fyles. The name "Tricouni Peak" was adopted on 22 June 1967.

== Climate ==
Based on the Köppen climate classification, Tricouni Peak is located in the marine west coast climate zone of western North America. Most weather fronts originate in the Pacific Ocean, and travel east toward the Coast Mountains where they are forced upward by the range (Orographic lift), causing them to drop their moisture in the form of rain or snowfall. As a result, the Coast Mountains experience high precipitation, especially during the winter months in the form of snowfall. Winter temperatures can drop below −20 °C with wind chill factors below −30 °C.

== Gallery ==
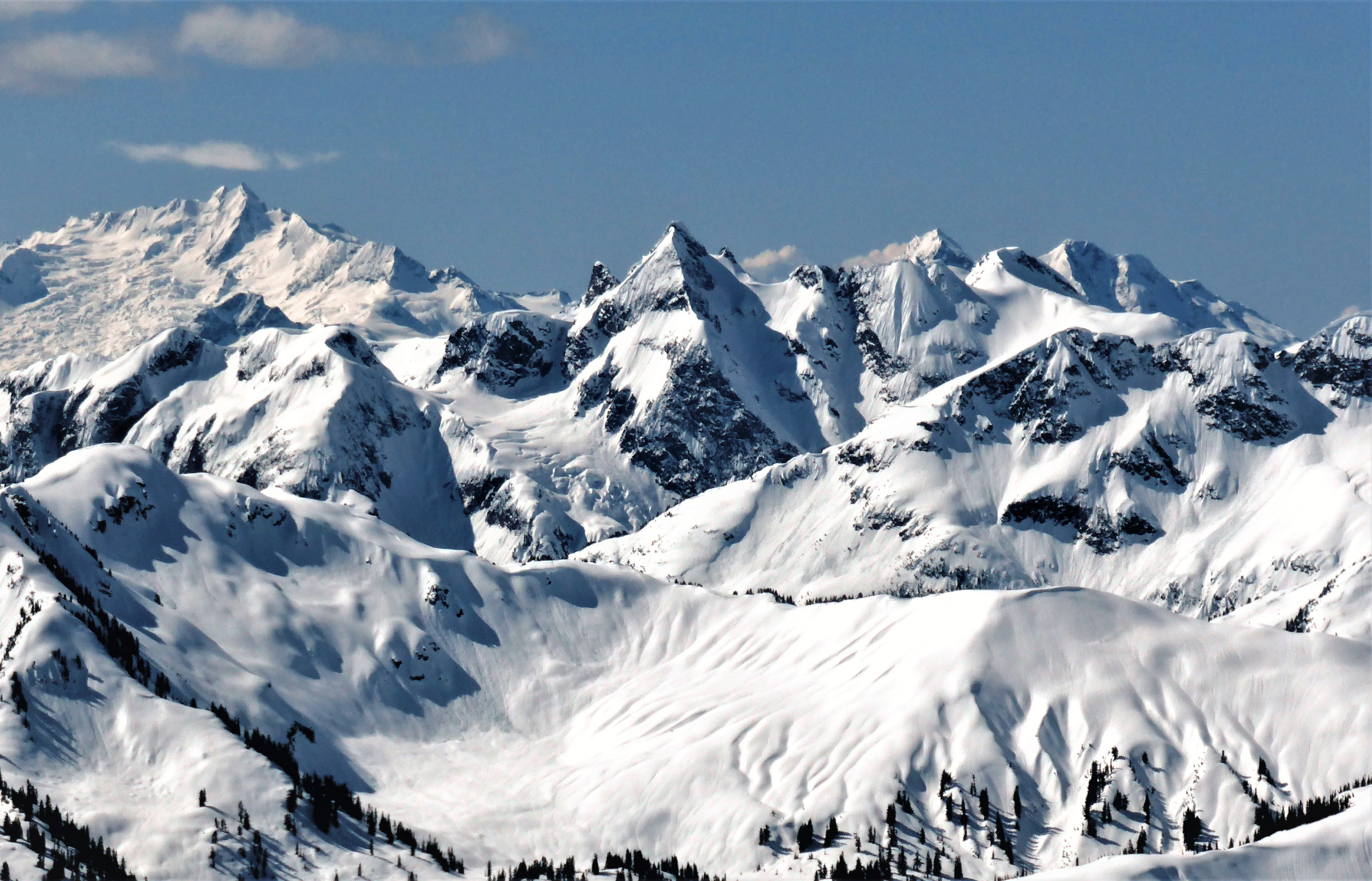
Tricouni Peak (center), Mount Tantalus (left)

== See also ==
- Geography of British Columbia
