= Mount Dewey =

Mountain in Graham Land, Antarctica

Mount Dewey (65°54′S 64°19′W) is a mountain, 1,830 metres (6,000 ft) high, standing 8 nautical miles (15 km) southeast of Mount Cheops on the west coast of Graham Land. It was charted by the British Graham Land Expedition of 1934–37 under John Rymill, and it was named by the UK Antarctic Place-Names Committee in 1959 for Melvil Dewey, the American originator of the Dewey Decimal Classification, from which the Universal Decimal Classification is derived.
