= Hugi Glacier =

Glacier in Antarctica

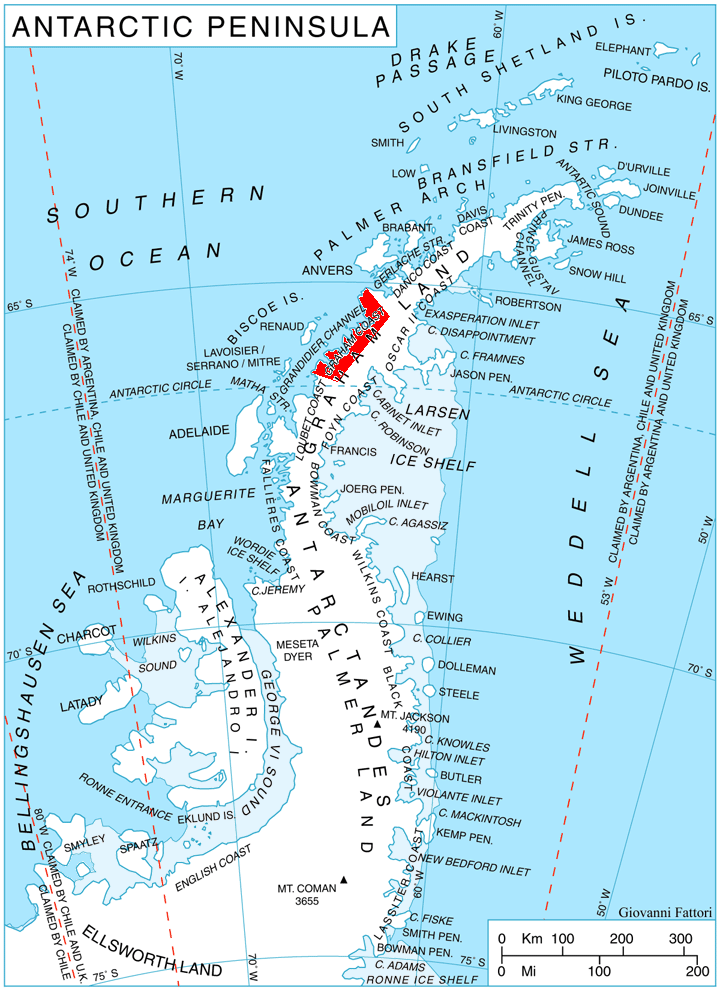
Location of Graham Coast on the Antarctic Peninsula.

Hugi Glacier (66°11′S 65°7′W) is a glacier flowing northward into the head of Holtedahl Bay southwest of Rasnik Peak, on the west coast of Graham Land, Antarctica. It was charted by the British Graham Land Expedition under John Rymill, 1934–37, and was named by the UK Antarctic Place-Names Committee in 1959 for Franz Joseph Hugi, a Swiss teacher who was called the "father of winter mountaineering," and was author of two pioneer works on glacier phenomena.
