= Mezzo Buttress =

Mezzo Buttress (66°3′S 64°31′W) is a rocky buttress (in geographic terms, a rock feature that is slightly removed from a main feature) at the head of Barilari Bay just east of Lawrie Glacier, on the west coast of Graham Land, Antarctica. It was charted by the British Graham Land Expedition under John Rymill, 1934–37, and was so named by the UK Antarctic Place-Names Committee in 1959 because the face of this buttress is conspicuously divided diagonally, half being composed of black rock and the other half of red rock, "mezzo" being an Italian word meaning "half".
