= Mount Genecand =

Mountain in Graham Land, Antarctica

Mount Genecand (66°6′S 64°39′W) is a mountain at the head of Barilari Bay between Lawrie Glacier and Weir Glacier, on the west coast of Graham Land, Antarctica. It was photographed by Hunting Aerosurveys Ltd in 1955–57, and mapped from these photos by the Falkland Islands Dependencies Survey. It was named by the UK Antarctic Place-Names Committee in 1959 for Félix-Valentin Genecand (1878–1957), a Swiss mountaineer who invented the Tricouni nail for climbing boots shortly before World War I.
