= Duyvis Point =

Headland in Antarctica

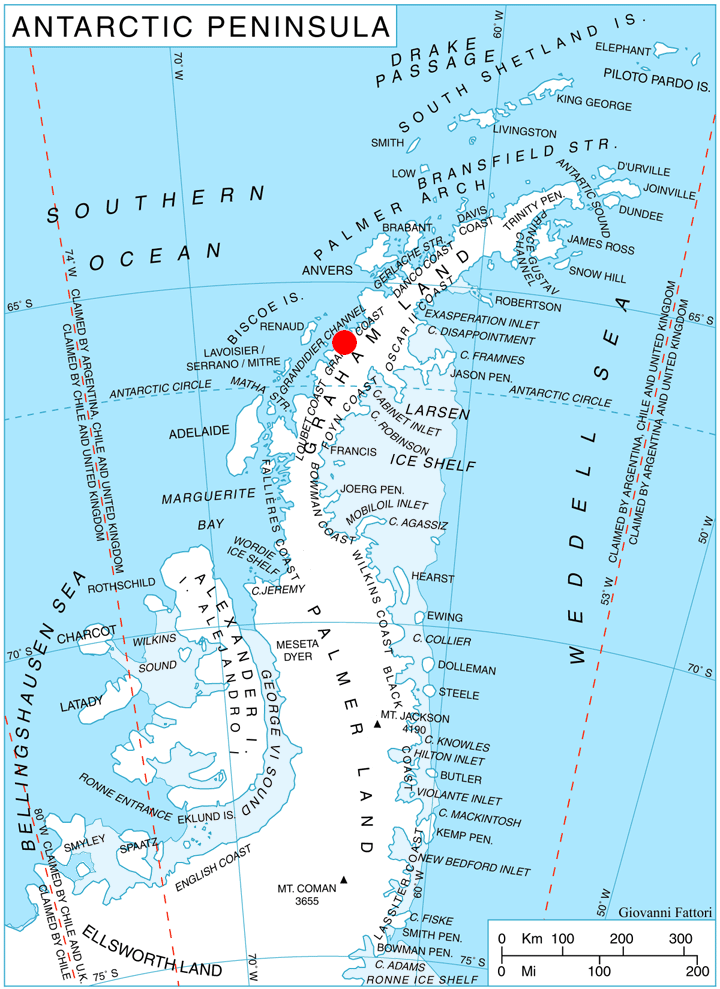
Location of Felipe Solo (Obligado) Peninsula in Graham Land, Antarctic Peninsula.

Duyvis Point (65°55′S 64°35′W) is the point forming the southeast side of the entrance to Urovene Cove situated 11 nautical miles (20 km) south-southeast of Cape Garcia and 2.65 km southeast of Laskar Point, on the southwest coast of Felipe Solo (Obligado) Peninsula, Graham Land in Antarctica. It was first roughly charted by the British Graham Land Expedition under John Rymill, 1934–37. It was mapped more accurately by the Falkland Islands Dependencies Survey from photos taken by Hunting Aerosurveys Ltd in 1956–57, and was named by the UK Antarctic Place-Names Committee for F. Donker Duyvis, a Dutch documentalist who was Secretary of the International Federation for Documentation.
