= Felipe Solo (Obligado) Peninsula =

Peninsula in Antarctica

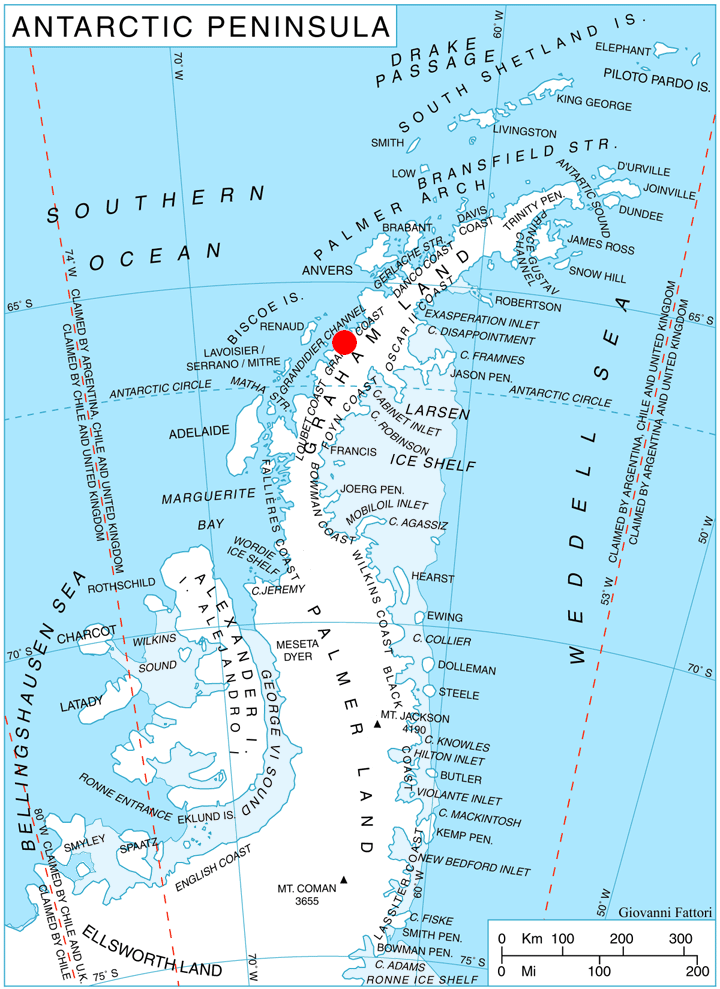
Location of Felipe Solo (Obligado) Peninsula in Graham Land, Antarctic Peninsula.

Felipe Solo (Obligado) Peninsula is the heavily glaciated 13.5 km wide peninsula projecting 19.8 km in northwest direction from Danco Coast on the west side of Graham Land, Antarctica. It is bounded by Barilari Bay to the southwest and Bigo Bay to the northeast, ending in Cape Garcia to the northwest, and separated from Biscoe Islands to the northwest by Grandidier Channel.

The peninsula is named both by Argentina and Chile, in the latter case after the Chilean hydrographer Felipe Solo de Zaldívar.

== Location ==
Felipe Solo (Obligado) Peninsula is centred at 65°50′00″S 64°32′00″W. British mapping in 1971.

== Maps ==
- British Antarctic Territory. Scale 1:200000 topographic map. DOS 610 Series, Sheet W 65 64. Directorate of Overseas Surveys, Tolworth, UK, 1971.
- Antarctic Digital Database (ADD). Scale 1:250000 topographic map of Antarctica. Scientific Committee on Antarctic Research (SCAR). Since 1993, regularly upgraded and updated.
