= Vorweg Point =

Vorweg Point (65°57′S 64°48′W) is a point northwest of Huitfeldt Point on the southwest side of Barilari Bay, on the west coast of Graham Land. Charted by the British Graham Land Expedition (BGLE) under Rymill, 1934–37. Named by the United Kingdom Antarctic Place-Names Committee (UK-APC) in 1959 for O. Vorweg, German pioneer exponent of skiing and author of Das Schneeschuh Laufen (1893), probably the earliest manual on skiing.
