= Holtedahl Bay =

Bay in Antarctica

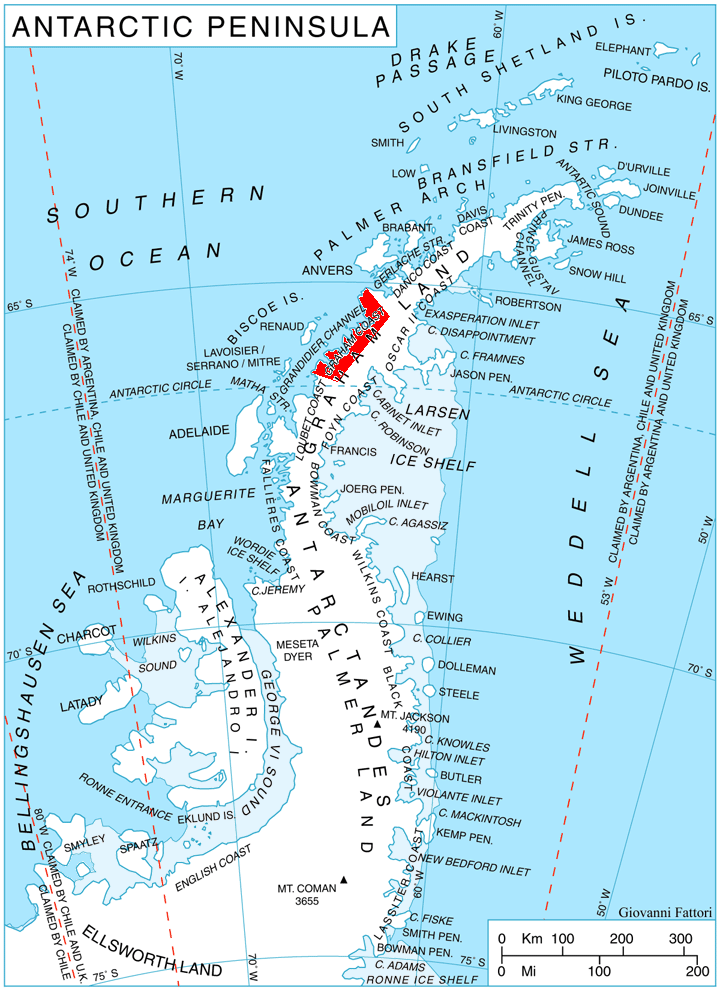
Location of Graham Coast on Antarctic Peninsula.

Holtedahl Bay (66°7′S 65°20′W) is a bay, 10 nautical miles (19 km) long in a northwest–southeast direction and averaging 6 nautical miles (11 km) wide, between Velingrad Peninsula and Stresher Peninsula along the west coast of Graham Land, Antarctica. The bay is entered southwest of Prospect Point and northeast of Black Head, and has its head fed by Hugi Glacier.

It was discovered by the British Graham Land Expedition, 1934–37, and named by John Rymill for Professor Olaf Holtedahl, a Norwegian geologist who conducted geologic research during 1927–28 in the South Shetland Islands and the Palmer Archipelago, to which he was transported by various whaling vessels.

== Maps ==
- Antarctic Digital Database (ADD). Scale 1:250000 topographic map of Antarctica. Scientific Committee on Antarctic Research (SCAR), 1993–2016.
