= Cape Garcia =

Cape on the coast of Graham Land, Antarctica

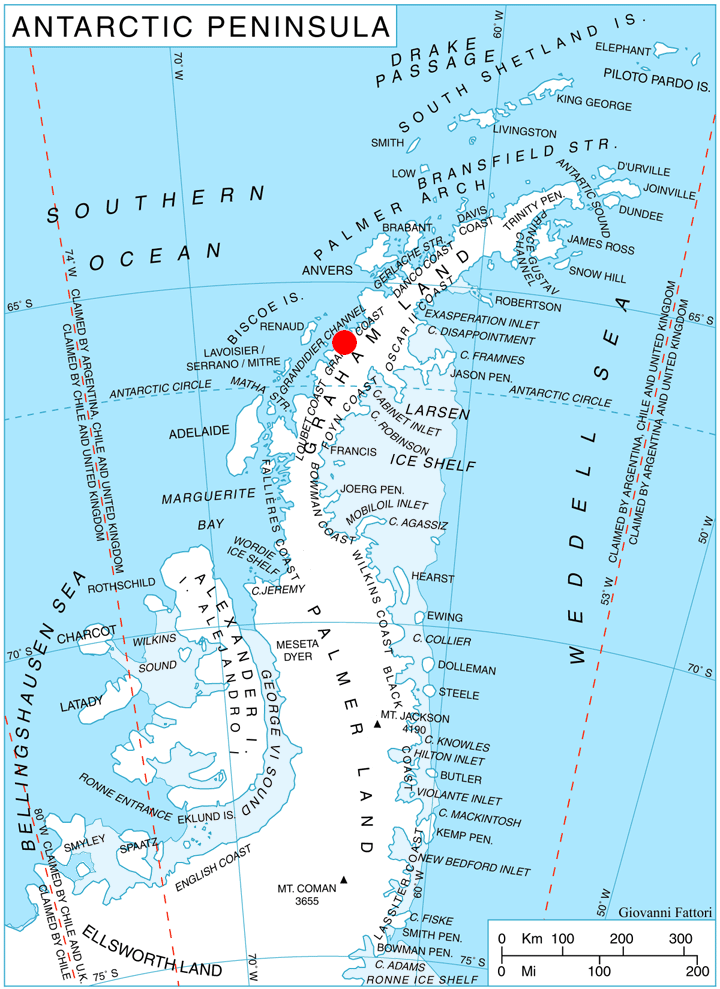
Location of Felipe Solo (Obligado) Peninsula in Graham Land, Antarctic Peninsula.

Cape Garcia (65°44′S 64°40′W) is a cape at the north side of the entrance to Barilari Bay, forming the north extremity of Felipe Solo (Obligado) Peninsula on the west coast of Graham Land, Antarctica. The cape was discovered and named "Cap Loqui" by the French Antarctic Expedition, 1903–05, under Jean-Baptiste Charcot. At the same time Charcot named the south entrance point to the bay "Cap Garcia," after Rear Admiral Garcia of the Argentine Navy. The maps of Charcot's French Antarctic Expedition, 1908–10, showed "Cap Garcia" as the north cape of Barilari Bay and the name has since become established for this feature. Charcot did not use the name "Cap Loqui" on the maps of his second expedition but, for the sake of historical continuity, the name Loqui Point has been accepted for the south entrance point.

Index Peak stands 7.5 miles (12 km) southeast of Cape Garcia.
