= Velingrad Peninsula =

Ice-covered peninsula in Antarctica

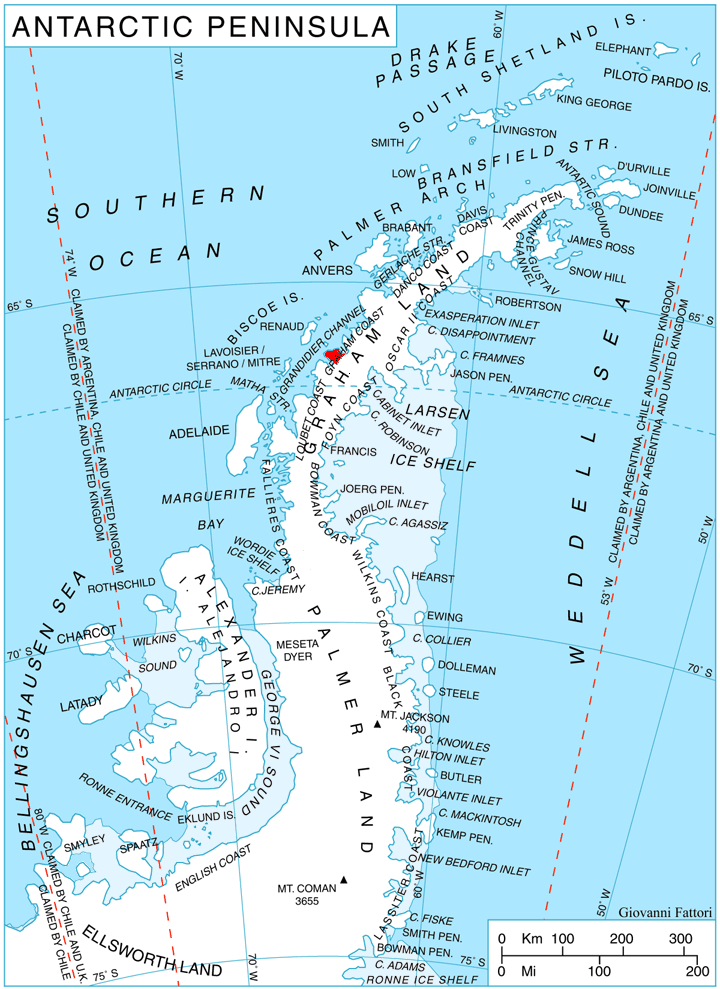
Location of Velingrad Peninsula on Graham Land, Antarctic Peninsula.

Velingrad Peninsula (Bulgarian: полуостров Велинград, romanized: poluostrov Velingrad, IPA: [poɫuˈɔstrov ˈvɛliŋɡrɐt]) is the ice-covered peninsula projecting 22.5 km in northwest direction from Graham Coast on the west side of Antarctic Peninsula. Bounded by Barilari Bay to the northeast and Holtedahl Bay to the southwest, and separated from Biscoe Islands to the northwest by Grandidier Channel. Its base is surmounted by Chiren Heights. The UK station Prospect Point operated at the west extremity of the peninsula in 1957–59.

The peninsula is named after the city of Velingrad in Southern Bulgaria.

== Location ==
Velingrad Peninsula is centred at 66°02′00″S 65°00′00″W. British mapping in 1971 and 1976.

== Maps ==
- British Antarctic Territory. Scale 1:200000 topographic map. DOS 610 Series, Sheet W 65 64. Directorate of Overseas Surveys, Tolworth, UK, 1971.
- British Antarctic Territory. Scale 1:200000 topographic map. DOS 610 Series, Sheet W 66 64. Directorate of Overseas Surveys, Tolworth, UK, 1976.
- Antarctic Digital Database (ADD). Scale 1:250000 topographic map of Antarctica. Scientific Committee on Antarctic Research (SCAR). Since 1993, regularly upgraded and updated.
