= Barilari Bay =

Bay in Antarctica

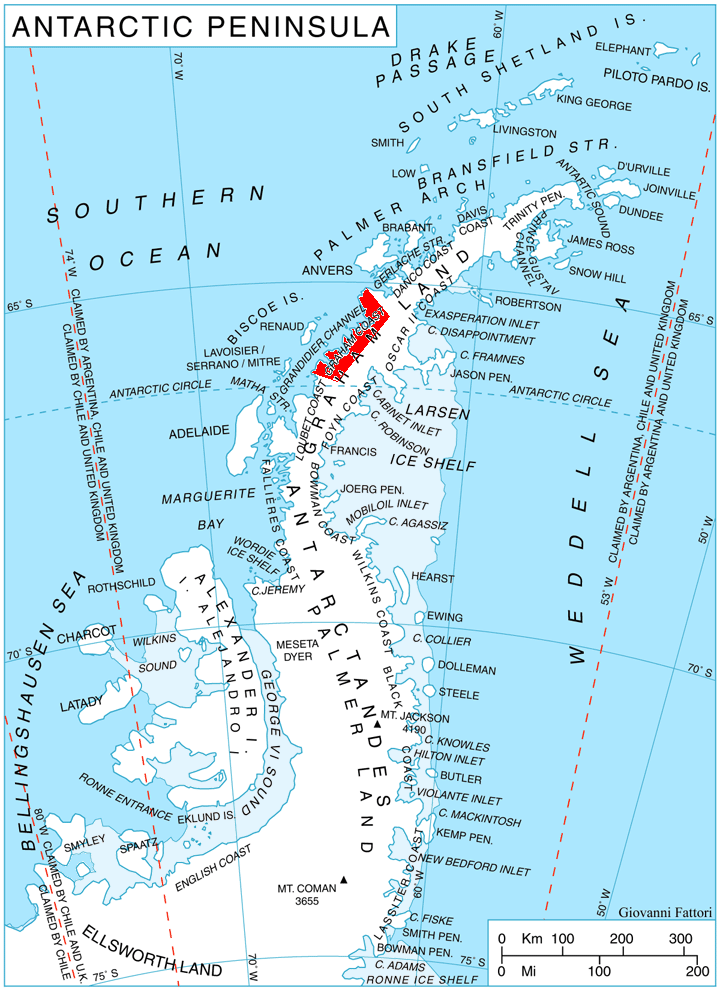
Location of Graham Coast on the Antarctic Peninsula.

Barilari Bay (65°55′S 64°43′W) is a bay 12 nautical miles (22 km) long and 6 nautical miles (11 km) wide, between Cape Garcia and Loqui Point on the west coast of Graham Land. The glaciers Birley, Lawrie, Weir and Bilgeri feed the bay.

It was discovered by the French Antarctic Expedition, 1903–05, and named by Jean-Baptiste Charcot for Rear Admiral Atilio S. Barilari of the Argentine Navy. It was re-charted by the British Graham Land Expedition, 1934–37, under John Rymill.
