= Erovete Peak =

Mountain in Antarctica

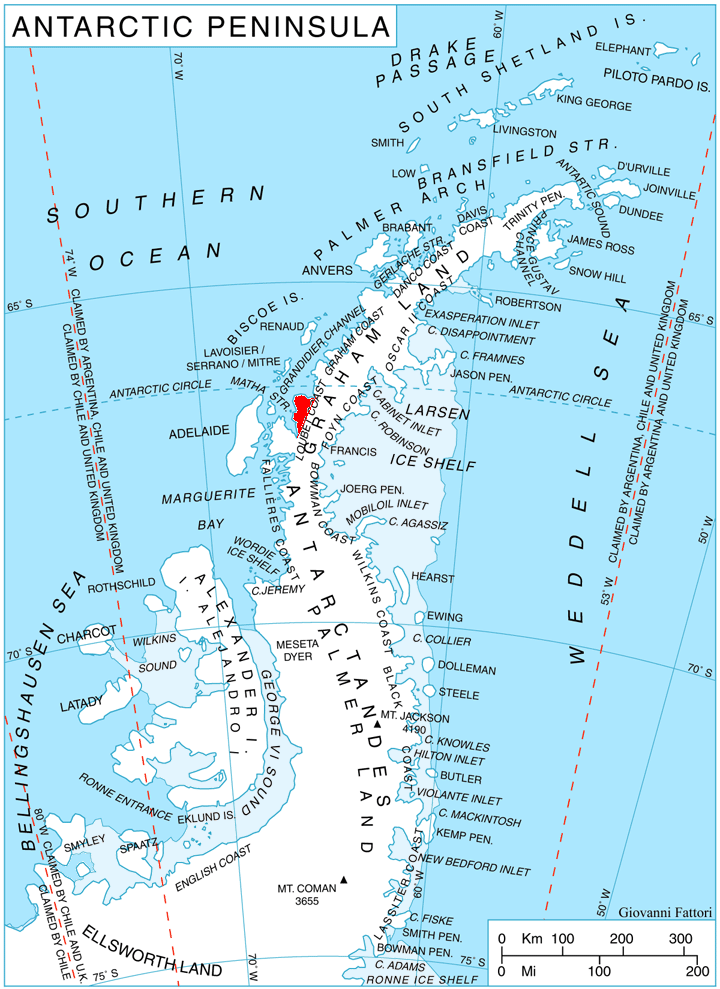
Location of Pernik Peninsula on Loubet Coast, Antarctic Peninsula.

Erovete Peak (Bulgarian: връх Еровете, romanized: vrah Erovete, IPA: [ˈvrɤx ˈɛrovɛtɛ]) is the rocky peak rising to 1824 m on the west coast of Pernik Peninsula, Loubet Coast in Graham Land, Antarctica. The feature has steep and partly ice-free west and southeast slopes, and surmounts Lallemand Fjord to the west, Haefeli Glacier to the southeast, and the lower courses of Finsterwalder Glacier and Sharp Glacier to the south.

The peak is named after the settlement of Erovete in Southern Bulgaria.

== Location ==
Erovete Peak is located at 67°14′56″S 66°23′09″W, which is 4.6 km south of Zhelev Peak, 13.7 km north-northwest of Armula Peak, 14 km east-northeast of Bartholin Peak and 15.6 km southeast of Hooke Point. British mapping in 1978.

== Maps ==
- Antarctic Digital Database (ADD). Scale 1:250000 topographic map of Antarctica. Scientific Committee on Antarctic Research (SCAR). Since 1993, regularly upgraded and updated.
- British Antarctic Territory. Scale 1:200000 topographic map. DOS 610 Series, Sheet W 67 66. Directorate of Overseas Surveys, Tolworth, UK, 1978.
