= Klepalo Hill =

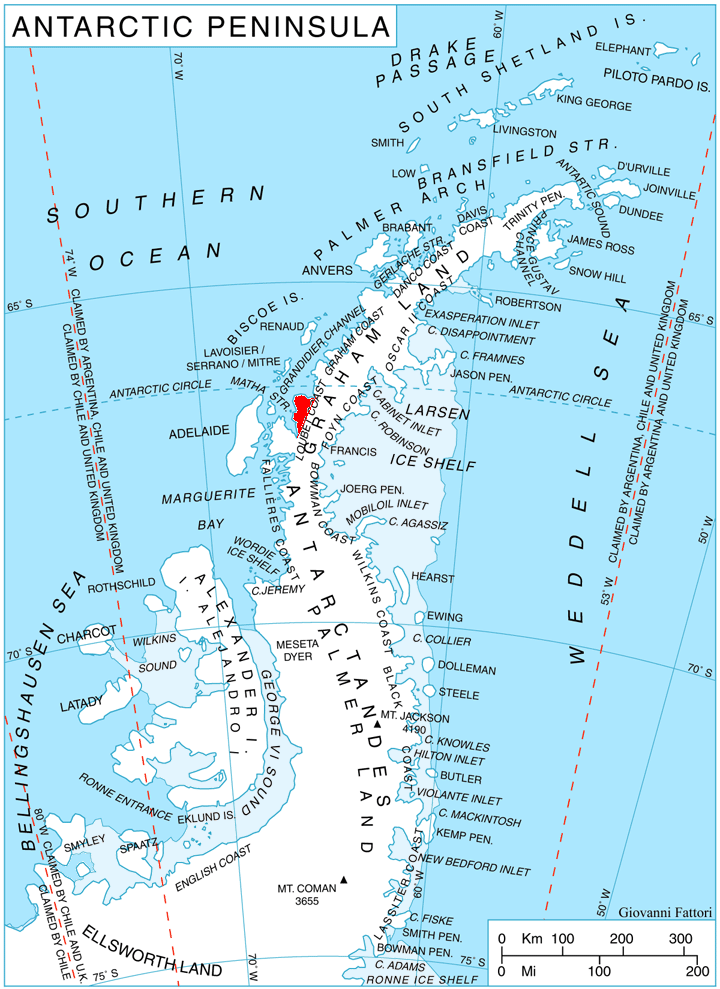
Location of Pernik Peninsula on Loubet Coast, Antarctic Peninsula.

Klepalo Hill (Bulgarian: хълм Клепало, ‘Halm Klepalo’ \'h&lm kle-'pa-lo\) is the ice-covered hill of elevation 772 m on Pernik Peninsula, Loubet Coast in Graham Land, Antarctica. It surmounts Dabrava Glacier to the south-southwest and Lallemand Fjord to the west.

The hill is named after the settlement of Klepalo in Southwestern Bulgaria.

== Location ==
Klepalo Hill is located at 66°56′30″S 66°26′52″W, which is 3.4 km south-southeast of Orford Cliff, 5 km west of Tammann Peaks and 12.2 km northeast of McCall Point. British mapping in 1976.

== Maps ==
- Antarctic Digital Database (ADD). Scale 1:250000 topographic map of Antarctica. Scientific Committee on Antarctic Research (SCAR). Since 1993, regularly upgraded and updated.
- British Antarctic Territory. Scale 1:200000 topographic map. DOS 610 Series, Sheet W 66 66. Directorate of Overseas Surveys, Tolworth, UK, 1976.
