= Kanchov Peak =

Mountain in Loubet Coast, Graham Land, Antarctica

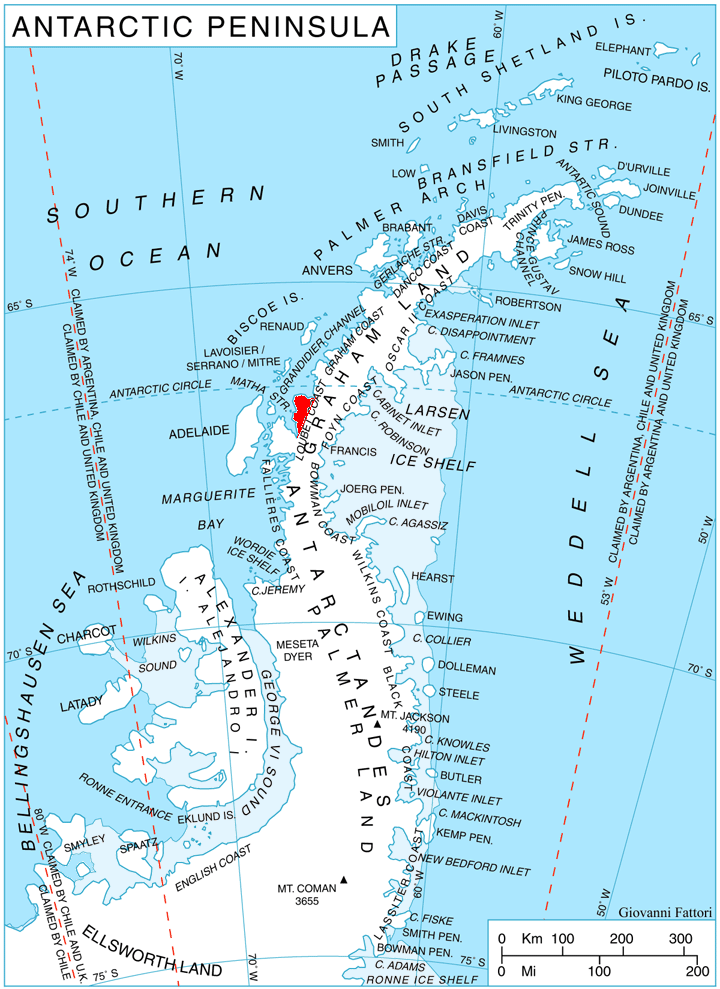
Location of Pernik Peninsula on Loubet Coast, Antarctic Peninsula.

Kanchov Peak (Bulgarian: Кънчов връх, romanized: Kanchov vrah, IPA: [ˈkɤnt͡ʃov ˈvrɤx]) is the rocky peak rising to 1272 m on the west coast of Pernik Peninsula, Loubet Coast in Graham Land, Antarctica. The feature has steep and partly ice-free slopes, surmounting Lallemand Fjord to the west, Salmon Cove to the north, and Field Glacier to the southeast and south.

The peak is named after the Bulgarian geographer, ethnographer and historian Vasil Kanchov (1862–1902).

== Location ==
Kanchov Peak is located at 67°07′35″S 66°26′14″W, which is 4 km southeast of Álvarez Point formed by an offshoot of the peak, 14.2 km southwest of Mount Deeley, 9.8 km north-northwest of Zhelev Peak and 13.9 km northeast of Hooke Point. British mapping in 1978.

== Maps ==
- Antarctic Digital Database (ADD). Scale 1:250000 topographic map of Antarctica. Scientific Committee on Antarctic Research (SCAR). Since 1993, regularly upgraded and updated.
- British Antarctic Territory. Scale 1:200000 topographic map. DOS 610 Series, Sheet W 67 66. Directorate of Overseas Surveys, Tolworth, UK, 1978.
