= Zhelev Peak =

Mountain in Antarctica

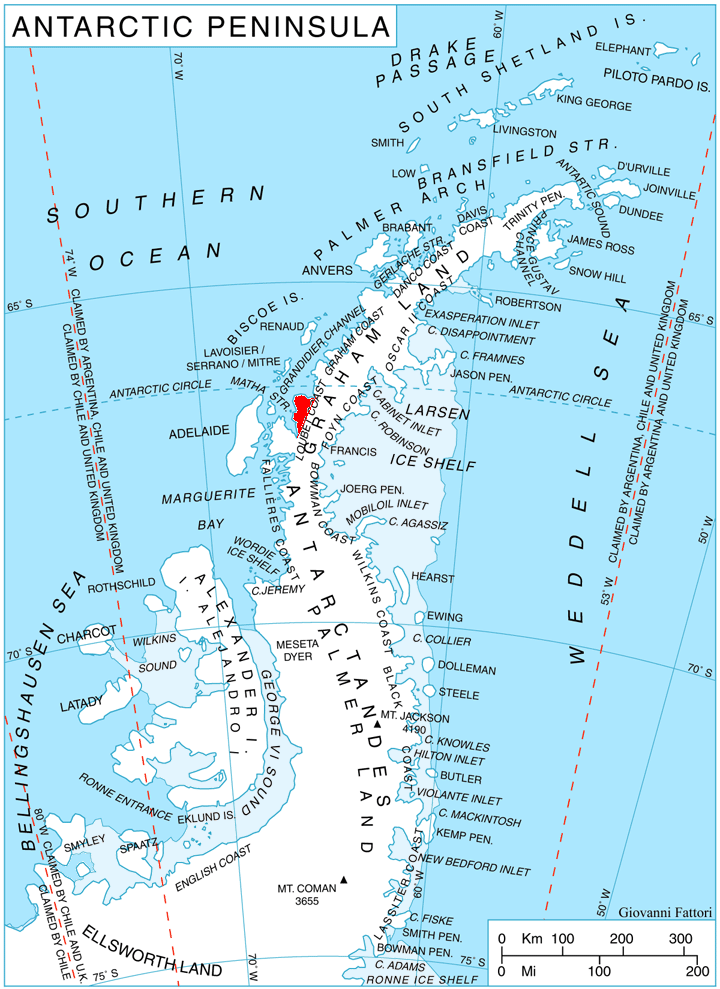
Location of Pernik Peninsula on Loubet Coast, Antarctic Peninsula.

Zhelev Peak (Bulgarian: Желев връх, romanized: Zhelev vrah, IPA: [ˈʒɛlɛv ˈvrɤx]) is the rocky peak rising to 1759 m on the west coast of Pernik Peninsula, Loubet Coast in Graham Land, Antarctica. The feature has steep and partly ice-free west slopes, and surmounts Lallemand Fjord to the west, Field Glacier to the north and its tributary Narezne Glacier to the northeast, and Haefeli Glacier to the south-southeast.

The peak is named after Zhelyu Zhelev (1935–2015), President of Bulgaria 1990–1997, for his support for the Bulgarian Antarctic programme.

== Location ==
Zhelev Peak is located at 67°12′32″S 66°21′40″W, which is 12.85 km southeast of Álvarez Point, 8.2 km southwest of Barziya Peak, 17.15 km northeast of Bartholin Peak and 15.35 km east of Hooke Point. British mapping in 1978.

== Maps ==
- Antarctic Digital Database (ADD). Scale 1:250000 topographic map of Antarctica. Scientific Committee on Antarctic Research (SCAR). Since 1993, regularly upgraded and updated.
- British Antarctic Territory. Scale 1:200000 topographic map. DOS 610 Series, Sheet W 67 66. Directorate of Overseas Surveys, Tolworth, UK, 1978.
