= Dabrava Glacier =

Glacier in Graham Land, Antarctica

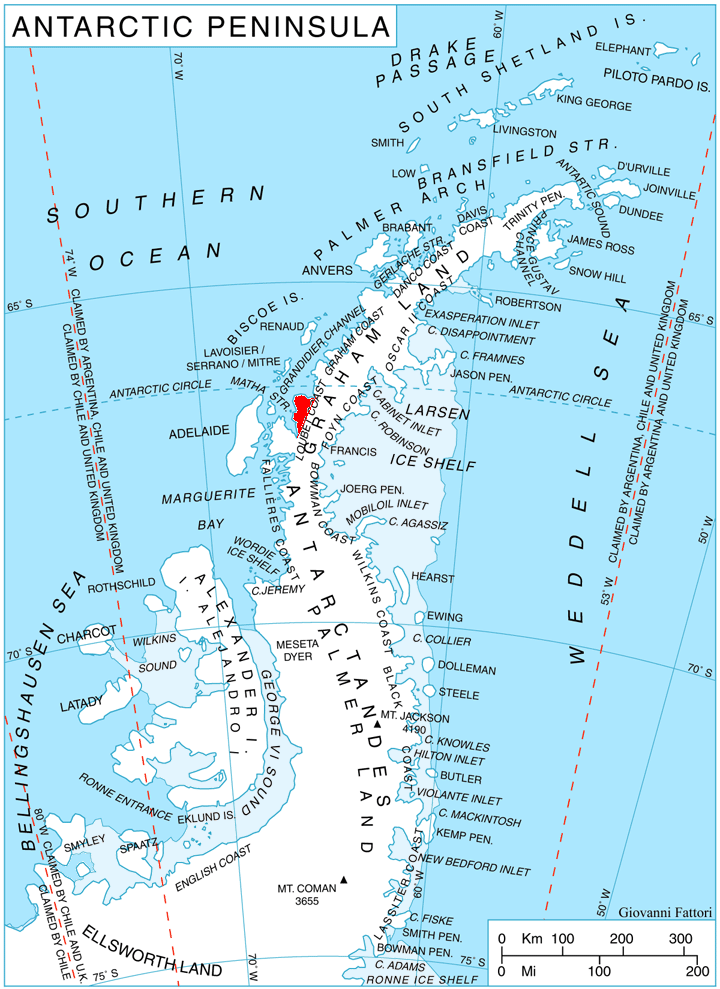
Location of Pernik Peninsula on Loubet Coast, Antarctic Peninsula.

Dabrava Glacier (Bulgarian: ледник Дъбрава, romanized: lednik Dabrava, IPA: [ˈlɛdniɡ dɐˈbravɐ]) is the 14 km long and 4.5 km wide glacier on Pernik Peninsula, Loubet Coast in Graham Land, Antarctica, situated southwest of Murphy Glacier and north of Sölch Glacier. It drains the west slopes of Mount Deeley, flows northwestwards and enters Lallemand Fjord southwest of Orford Cliff.

The glacier is named after the settlements of Dabrava in Northern, Northeastern, Southern and Southwestern Bulgaria.

== Location ==
Dabrava Glacier is centred at 66°58′30″S 66°28′00″W. British mapping in 1976 and 1978.

== Maps ==
- Antarctic Digital Database (ADD). Scale 1:250000 topographic map of Antarctica. Scientific Committee on Antarctic Research (SCAR). Since 1993, regularly upgraded and updated.
- British Antarctic Territory. Scale 1:200000 topographic map. DOS 610 Series, Sheet W 66 66. Directorate of Overseas Surveys, Tolworth, UK, 1976.
- British Antarctic Territory. Scale 1:200000 topographic map. DOS 610 Series, Sheet W 67 66. Directorate of Overseas Surveys, Tolworth, UK, 1978.
