= Tammann Peaks =

Mountain in Antarctica

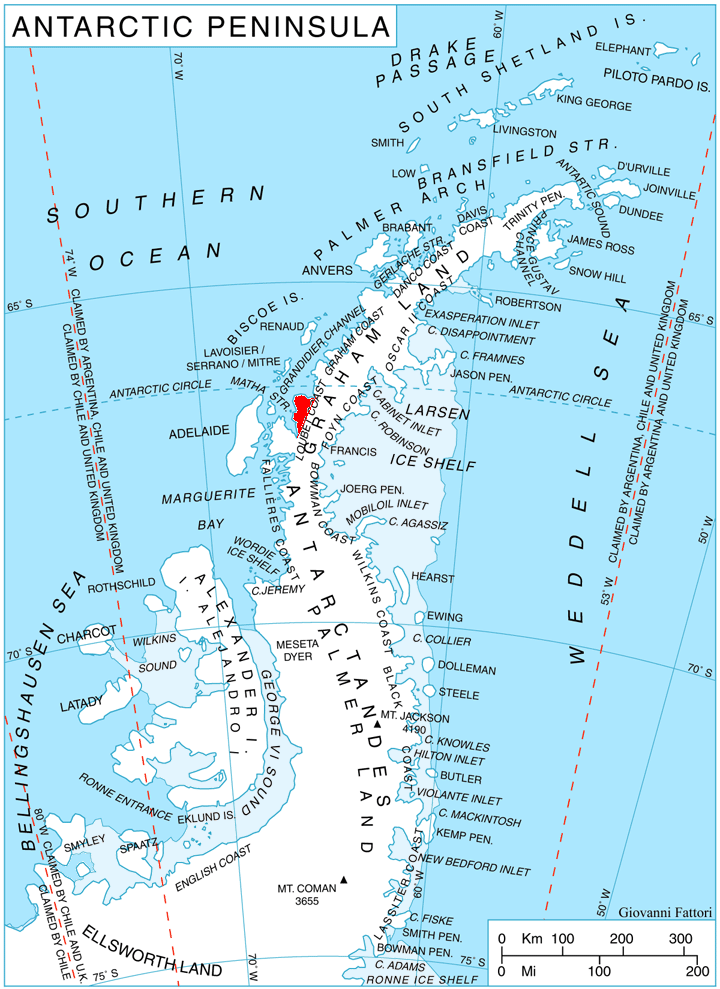
Location of Pernik Peninsula on Loubet Coast, Antarctic Peninsula.

Tammann Peaks (66°57′S 66°21′W) are peaks on Pernik Peninsula, Loubet Coast in Graham Land, standing 4 nautical miles (7 km) southeast of Orford Cliff, a like distance east of Lallemand Fjord and 5 km east of Klepalo Hill. Mapped from air photos taken by Falkland Islands and Dependencies Aerial Survey Expedition (FIDASE) (1956–57). Named by United Kingdom Antarctic Place-Names Committee (UK-APC) for Gustav Heinrich Tammann, German physical chemist who (1900–1935) made important studies of the physical properties of ice.
