= Murphy Glacier =

Glacier in Graham Land, Antarctica

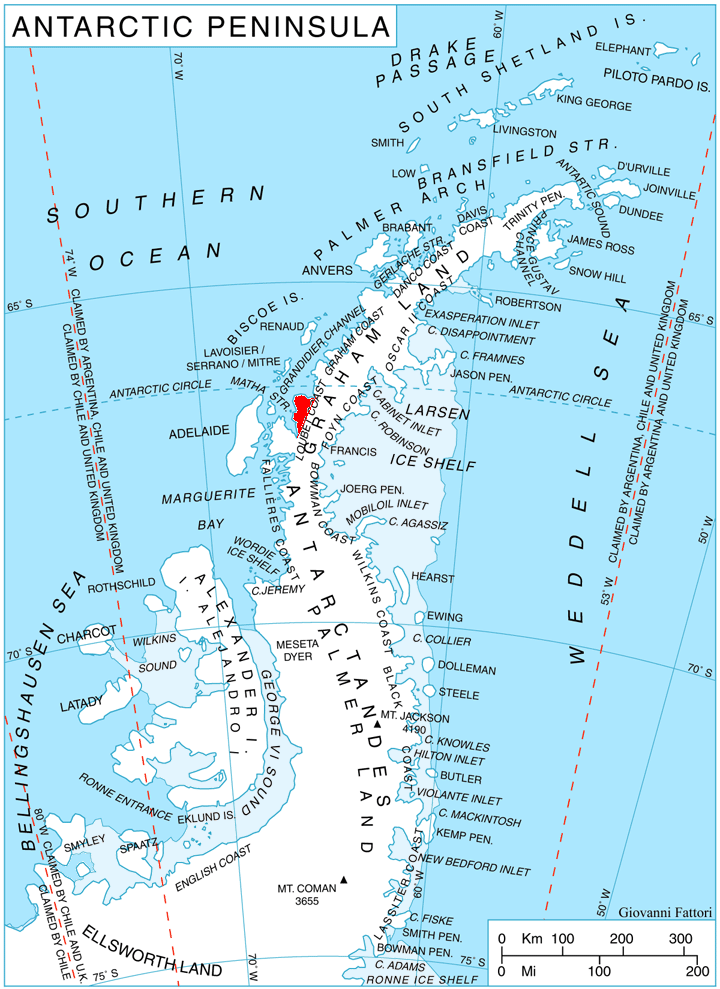
- Location of Pernik Peninsula on Loubet Coast, Antarctic Peninsula.

- Location within Antarctica
- Location: Antarctica
- Coordinates: 66°54′S 66°20′W

Murphy Glacier is a glacier on Pernik Peninsula, Loubet Coast in Graham Land, flowing generally westward to Orford Cliff and merging with Wilkinson Glacier before terminating in Lallemand Fjord. It was mapped from air photos taken by Falkland Islands and Dependencies Aerial Survey Expedition (FIDASE) (1956–57). It was named for Thomas L. Murphy, Falkland Islands Dependencies Survey (FIDS) leader and assistant surveyor at Detaille Island in 1956.
