= Barziya Peak =

Mountain in Antarctica

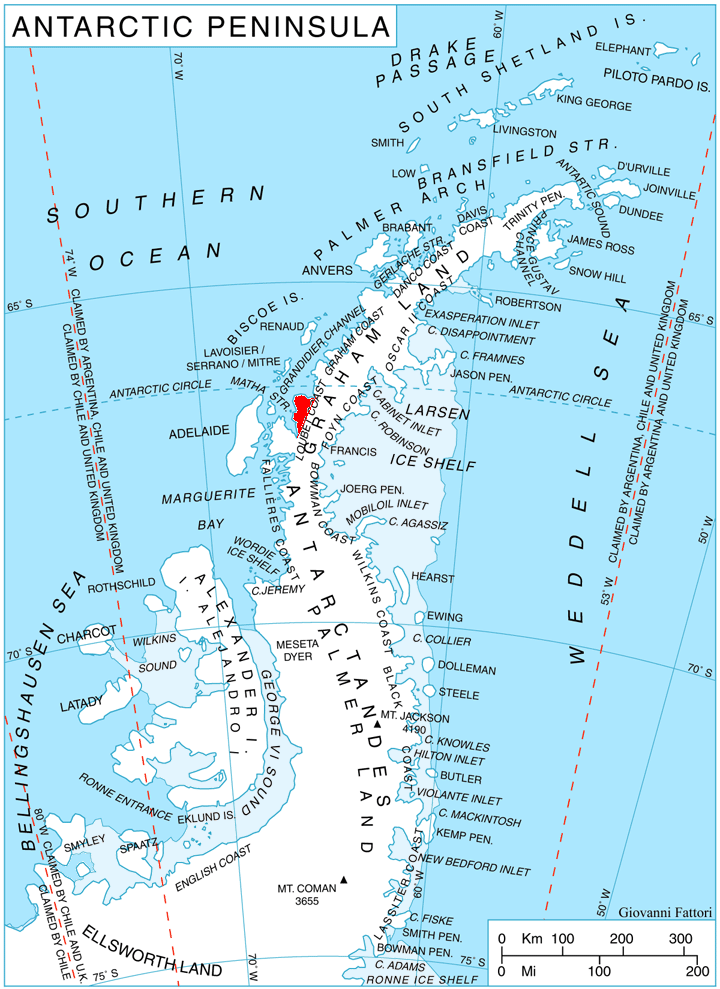
Location of Pernik Peninsula on Loubet Coast, Antarctic Peninsula.

Barziya Peak (Bulgarian: връх Бързия, romanized: vrah Barziya, IPA: [ˈvrɤɣ bɐrˈzijɐ]) is the mostly ice-covered peak rising to 1940 m in the south part of Pernik Peninsula, Loubet Coast in Graham Land, Antarctica. The feature has steep and partly ice-free southwest and northwest slopes, surmounting Field Glacier to the north and west, and its tributary Narezne Glacier to the southwest.

The peak is named after the settlement of Barziya in Northwestern Bulgaria.

== Location ==
Barziya Peak is located at 67°10′00″S 66°12′26″W, which is 15 km east-southeast of Álvarez Point, 15 km south of Mount Deeley and 8.2 km northeast of Zhelev Peak. British mapping in 1978.

== Maps ==
- Antarctic Digital Database (ADD). Scale 1:250000 topographic map of Antarctica. Scientific Committee on Antarctic Research (SCAR). Since 1993, regularly upgraded and updated.
- British Antarctic Territory. Scale 1:200000 topographic map. DOS 610 Series, Sheet W 67 66. Directorate of Overseas Surveys, Tolworth, UK, 1978.
