= Liebig Peak =

Mountain in Graham Land, Antarctica

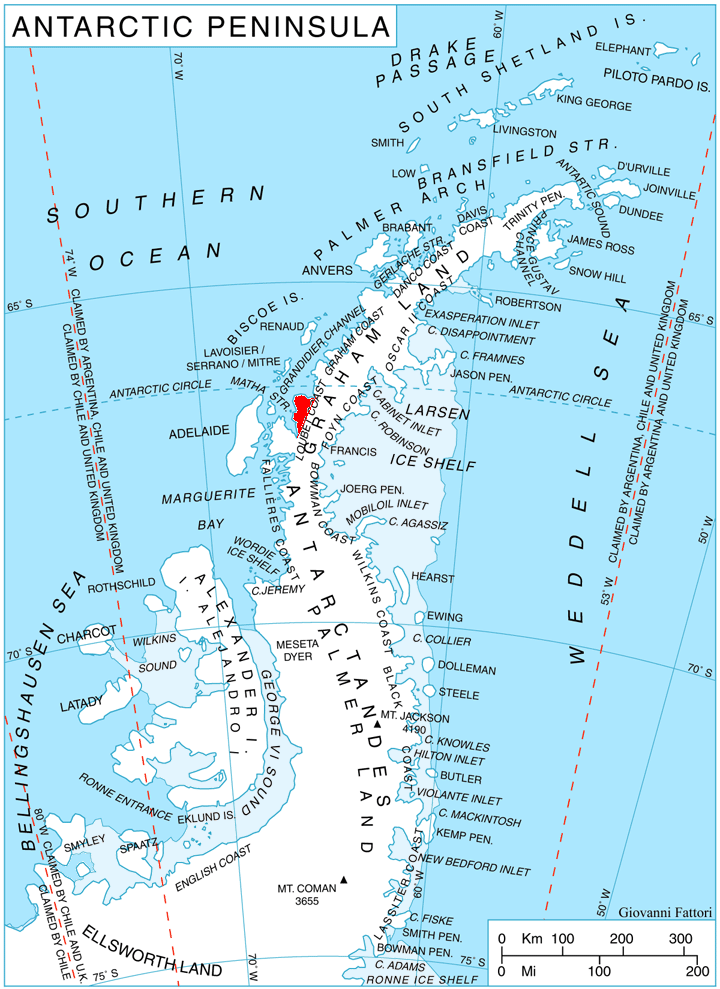
Location of Pernik Peninsula on Loubet Coast, Antarctic Peninsula.

Liebig Peak (66°46′S 66°0′W) is a prominent peak on the Protector Heights, Pernik Peninsula, on the Loubet Coast of Graham Land, Antarctica. It is identifiable from both Darbel Bay and Lallemand Fjord. The peak was mapped from air photos taken by the Falkland Islands and Dependencies Aerial Survey Expedition (1956–57), and was named by the UK Antarctic Place-Names Committee for Justus von Liebig, a German pioneer of physiological chemistry, whose work on metabolism and food constituents laid the foundations for modern nutrition studies.
