= Neb Bluff =

Rock formation in Graham Land, Antarctica

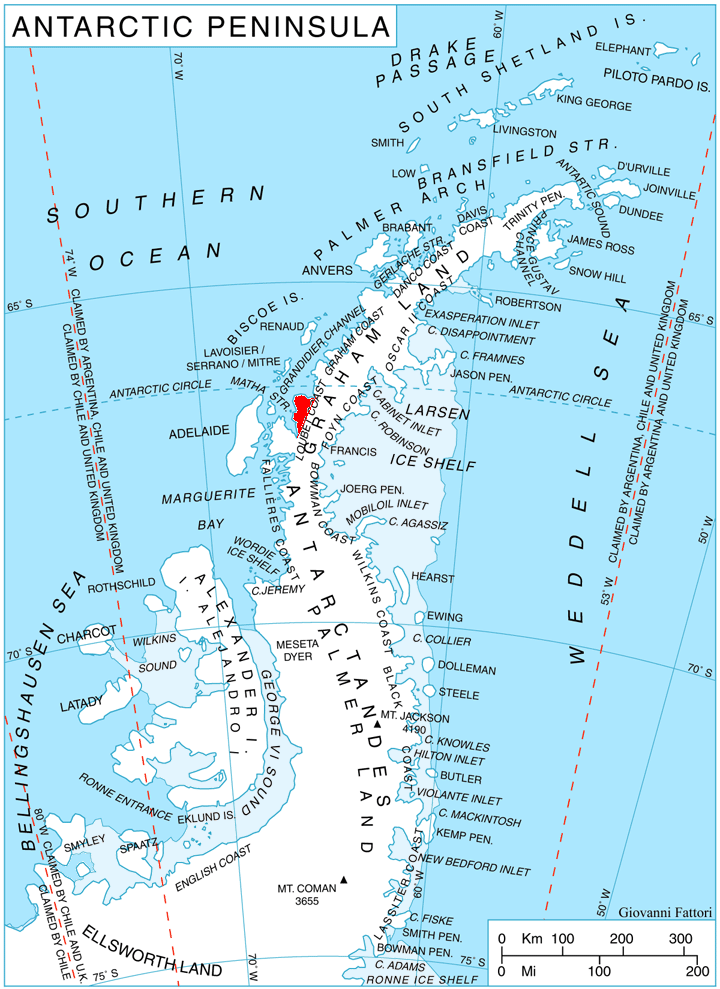
Location of Pernik Peninsula on Loubet Coast, Antarctic Peninsula.

Neb Bluff (67°0′S 66°35′W) is a conspicuous rock bluff 6 nautical miles (11 km) south of Orford Cliff on the west coast of Pernik Peninsula, Loubet Coast in Graham Land, overlooking the east side of Lallemand Fjord. Surveyed by Falkland Islands Dependencies Survey (FIDS) in 1956 and so named because of its snout-like appearance.
