= Armula Peak =

Peak in Graham Land, Antarctica

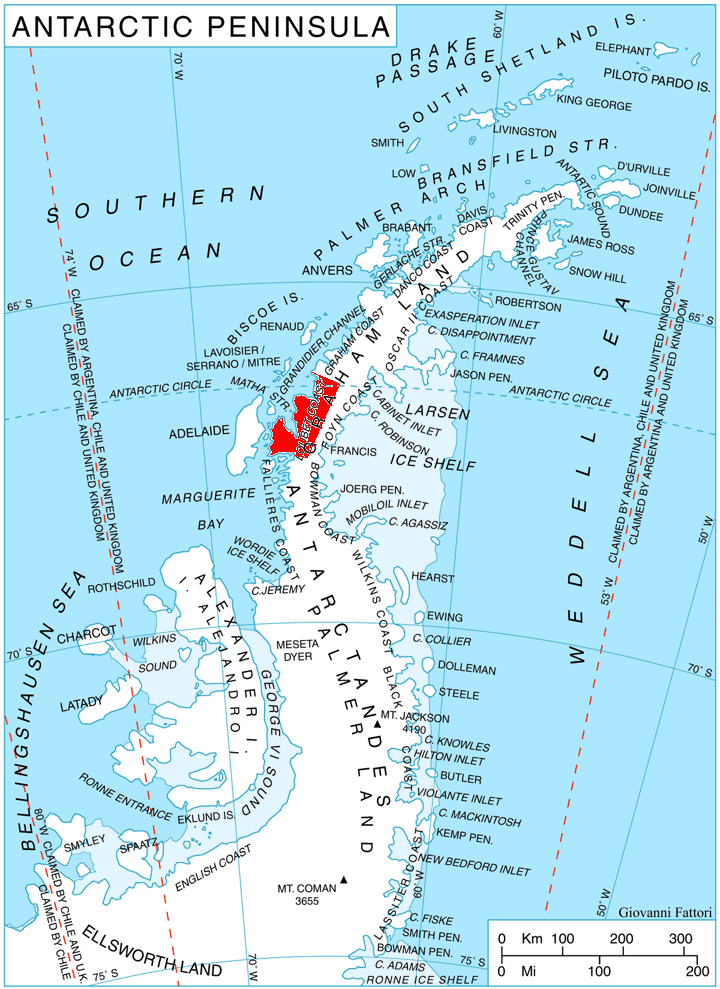
Location of Loubet Coast on the Antarctic Peninsula.

Armula Peak (Bulgarian: връх Армула, romanized: vrah Armula, IPA: [ˈvrɤx ɐrˈmuɫɐ]) is the ice-covered peak rising to 1142 m in the west foothills of Hemimont Plateau, Loubet Coast in Graham Land, Antarctica. The feature has steep and partly ice-free south slopes, and surmounts Klebelsberg Glacier to the south, and Finsterwalder Glacier to the north and northwest.

The peak is named after the ancient Thracian settlement of Armula in Western Bulgaria.

== Location ==
Armula Peak is located at 67°21′51.4″S 66°16′13″W, which is 13.7 km south-southeast of Erovete Peak, 9.14 km north of Smilyan Bastion and 17 km east-northeast of Quervain Peak. British mapping in 1978.

== Maps ==
- Antarctic Digital Database (ADD). Scale 1:250000 topographic map of Antarctica. Scientific Committee on Antarctic Research (SCAR). Since 1993, regularly upgraded and updated.
- British Antarctic Territory. Scale 1:200000 topographic map. DOS 610 Series, Sheet W 67 66. Directorate of Overseas Surveys, Tolworth, UK, 1978.
