= Sölch Glacier =

Glacier in Graham Land, Antarctica

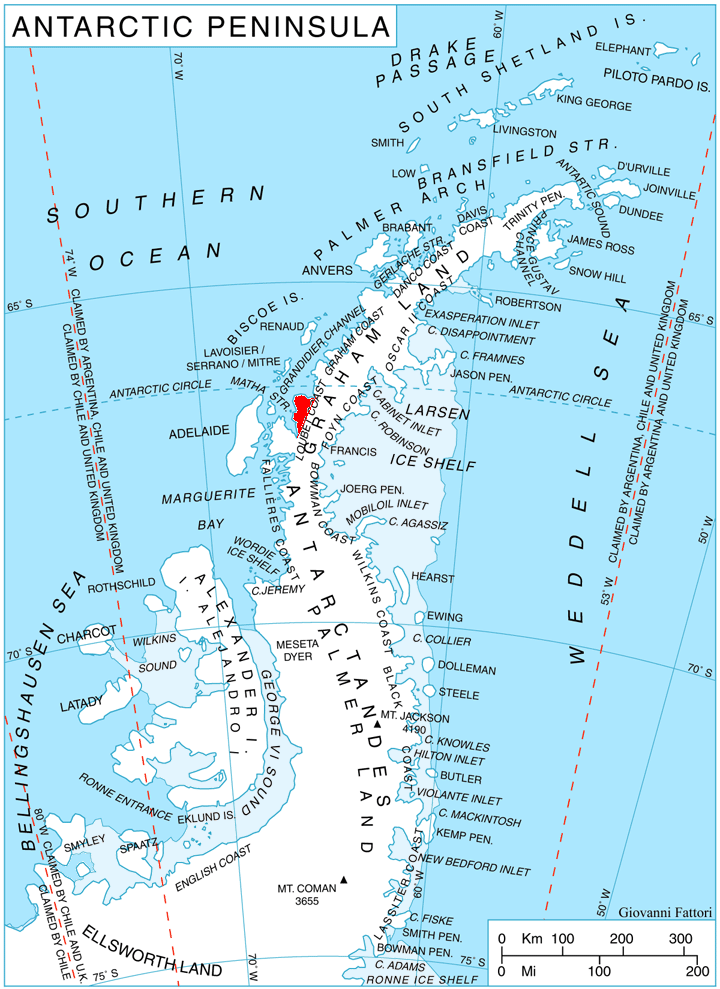
Location of Pernik Peninsula on Loubet Coast, Antarctic Peninsula.

Sölch Glacier (67°4′S 66°23′W) is a glacier on the Pernik Peninsula of the Loubet Coast in Graham Land, flowing west to Salmon Cove just north of Kanchov Peak on the east side of Lallemand Fjord. It was mapped from air photos taken by the Falkland Islands and Dependencies Aerial Survey Expedition, 1956–57, and named by United Kingdom Antarctic Place-Names Committee for Johann Sölch (1883–1951), an Austrian glacial geologist and glaciologist.
