= Narezne Glacier =

Glacier in Graham Land, Antarctica

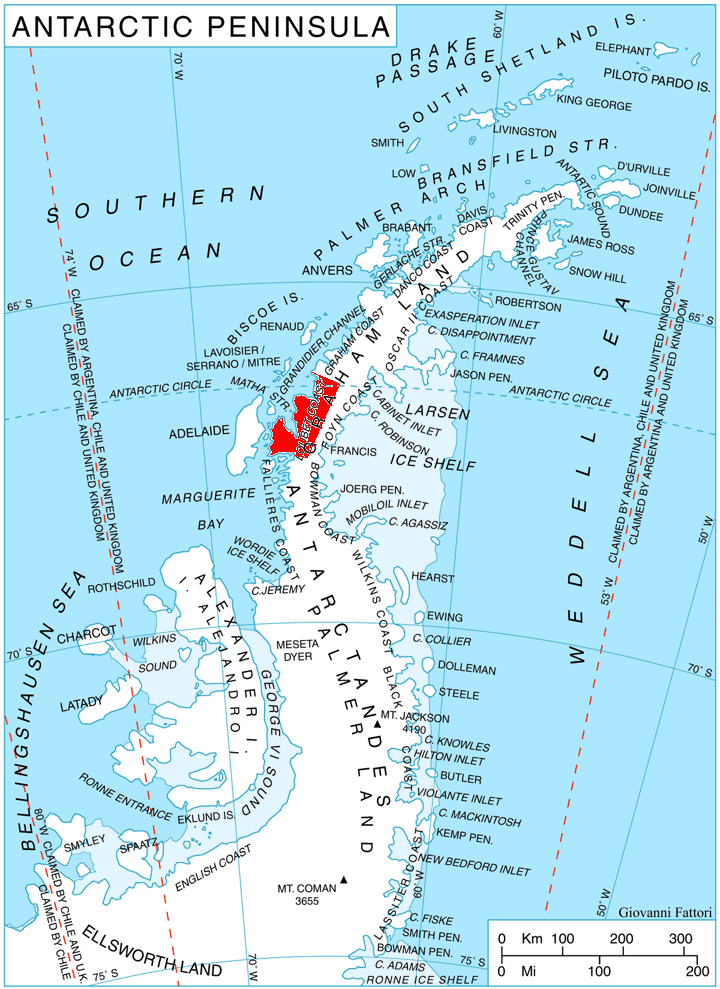
Location of Loubet Coast on the Antarctic Peninsula.

Narezne Glacier (Bulgarian: ледник Нарезне, romanized: lednik Narezne, IPA: [ˈlɛdnik nɐˈrɛznɛ]) is the 7 km long and 2.2 km wide glacier on Loubet Coast in Graham Land, Antarctica situated on the west side of Avery Plateau south of Field Glacier, northwest of the head of Finsterwalder Glacier and north of Haefeli Glacier. It flows northwestwards and joins Field Glacier west of Barziya Peak.

The glacier is named after the cave of Narezne in Northwestern Bulgaria.

== Location ==
Narezne Glacier is centred at 67°11′05″S 66°16′30″W. British mapping in 1978.

== Maps ==
- Antarctic Digital Database (ADD). Scale 1:250000 topographic map of Antarctica. Scientific Committee on Antarctic Research (SCAR). Since 1993, regularly upgraded and updated.
- British Antarctic Territory. Scale 1:200000 topographic map. DOS 610 Series, Sheet W 67 66. Directorate of Overseas Surveys, Tolworth, UK, 1978.
