= Chepra Cove =

Cove in Graham Land, Antarctica

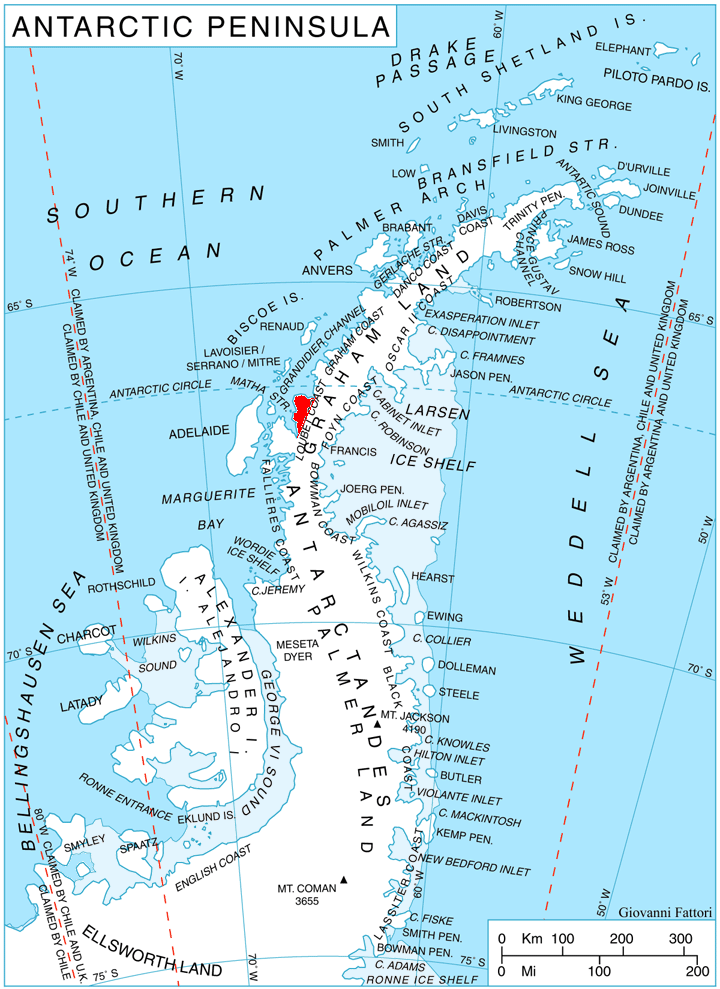
Location of Pernik Peninsula on Loubet Coast, Antarctic Peninsula.

Chepra Cove (Bulgarian: залив Чепра, ‘Zaliv Chepra’ \'za-liv che-'pra\) is the 1.7 km wide cove indenting for 2.3 km the west coast of Pernik Peninsula on Loubet Coast in Graham Land, Antarctica. It is a part of Lallemand Fjord entered south of Holdfast Point, and has its head fed by Koriten Glacier.

The cove is named after the cave of Chepra in Southeastern Bulgaria.

== Location ==
Chepra Cove is centred at 66°48′08″S 66°33′10″W. British mapping in 1976.

== Maps ==
- Antarctic Digital Database (ADD). Scale 1:250000 topographic map of Antarctica. Scientific Committee on Antarctic Research (SCAR). Since 1993, regularly upgraded and updated.
- British Antarctic Territory. Scale 1:200000 topographic map. DOS 610 Series, Sheet W 66 66. Directorate of Overseas Surveys, Tolworth, UK, 1976.
