= Solun Glacier =

Glacier in Antarctica

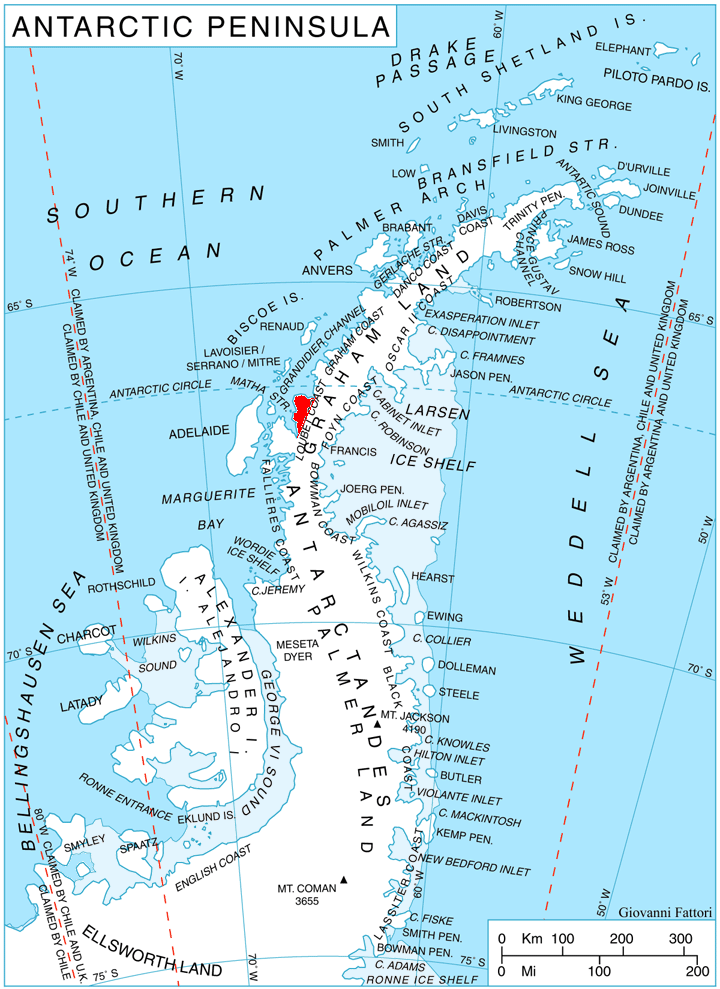
Location of Pernik Peninsula on Loubet Coast, Antarctic Peninsula.

Solun Glacier (Bulgarian: ледник Солун, romanized: lednik Solun, IPA: [ˈlɛdnik ˈsɔɫon]) is the 9.3 km long and 4 km wide glacier on Pernik Peninsula, Loubet Coast on the west side of Antarctic Peninsula, situated east of Škorpil Glacier and northwest of McCance Glacier. It drains the north slopes of Protector Heights, and flows northwards into Darbel Bay.

The glacier is named after the Bulgarian High School of Solun (Thessaloniki), a major Bulgarian education centre during the late 19th and early 20th century; presently located in Blagoevgrad, Southwestern Bulgaria.

== Location ==
Solun Glacier is centred at 66°38′50″S 66°03′00″W. British mapping in 1976.

== Maps ==
- British Antarctic Territory. Scale 1:200000 topographic map. DOS 610 Series, Sheet W 66 66. Directorate of Overseas Surveys, Tolworth, UK, 1976.
- Antarctic Digital Database (ADD). Scale 1:250000 topographic map of Antarctica. Scientific Committee on Antarctic Research (SCAR), 1993–2016.
