= Škorpil Glacier =

Antarctic glacier

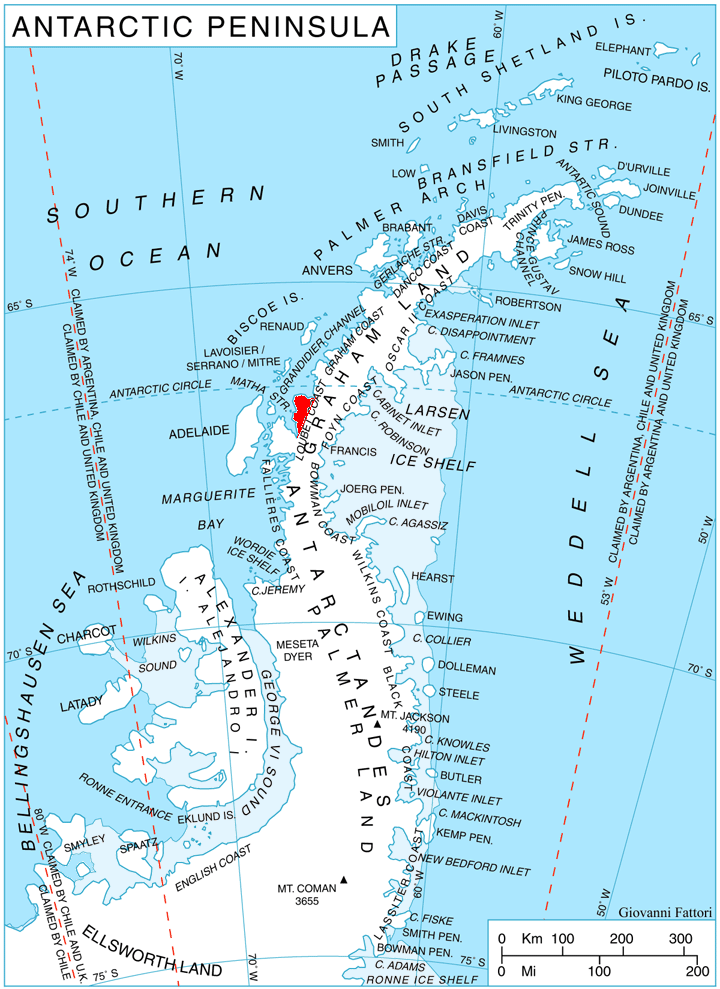
Location of Pernik Peninsula on Loubet Coast, Antarctic Peninsula.

Škorpil Glacier (Bulgarian: ледник Шкорпил, romanized: lednik Škorpil, IPA: [ˈlɛdnik ˈʃkɔrpiɫ]) is the 12 km long and 10 km wide glacier on Pernik Peninsula, Loubet Coast on the west side of Antarctic Peninsula, situated northeast of Stefan Ice Piedmont and W of Solun Glacier. It drains the north slopes of Protector Heights, and flows northwards into Darbel Bay east of Madell Point.

The glacier is named after the Czech Bulgarian archeologist Karel Škorpil (1859–1944).

== Location ==
Škorpil Glacier is centred at 66°37′50″S 66°16′00″W. British mapping in 1976.

== Maps ==
- British Antarctic Territory. Scale 1:200000 topographic map. DOS 610 Series, Sheet W 66 66. Directorate of Overseas Surveys, Tolworth, UK, 1976.
- Antarctic Digital Database (ADD). Scale 1:250000 topographic map of Antarctica. Scientific Committee on Antarctic Research (SCAR), 1993–2016.
