= Smilyan Bastion =

Rounded ice-covered buttress

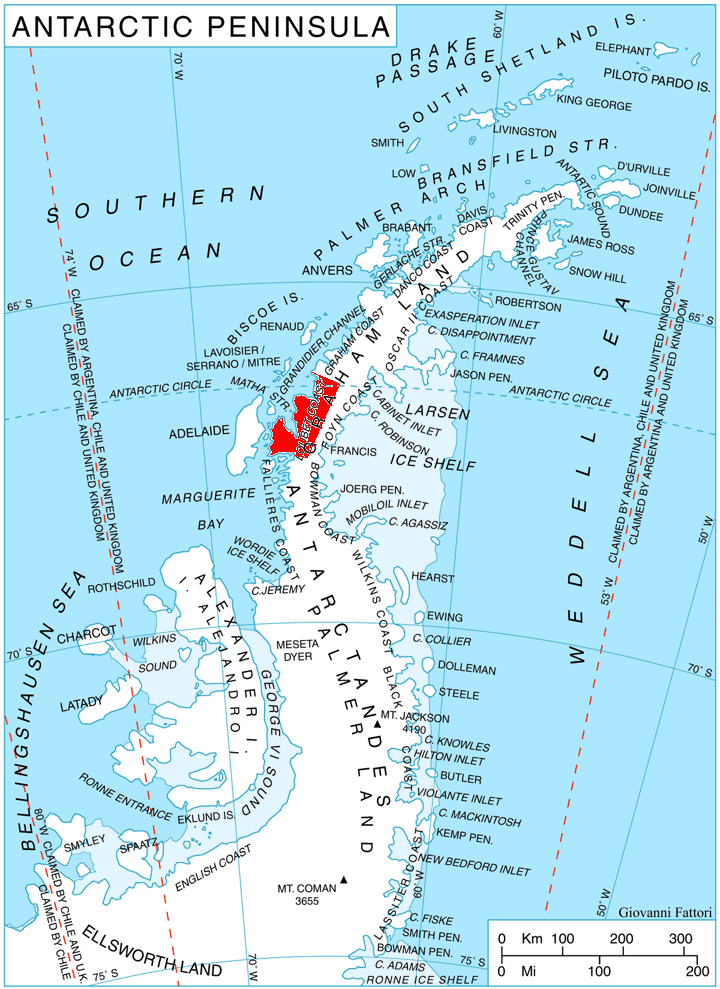
Location of Loubet Coast on the Antarctic Peninsula.

Smilyan Bastion (Bulgarian: Смилянски рид, ‘Smilyanski Rid’ \'smi-lyan-ski 'rid\) is the rounded ice-covered buttress extending 13 km in southeast-northwest direction and 16 km in south-southwest to north-northeast direction, and rising to 1525 m on the west side of Hemimont Plateau on Loubet Coast in Graham Land, Antarctica. The feature has steep and partly ice-free south, west and north slopes, and surmounts Barnes Glacier to the south, Blind Bay to the southwest, Forel Glacier and Sharp Glacier to the west, and Klebelsberg Glacier to the northeast.

The buttress is named after the settlement of Smilyan in Southern Bulgaria.

== Location ==
Smilyan Bastion is located at 67°27′19″S 66°19′40″W, which is 9.14 km south of Armula Peak, 13 km north-northeast of Hayduta Buttress and 15.45 km east-southeast of Quervain Peak. British mapping in 1978.

== Maps ==
- Antarctic Digital Database (ADD). Scale 1:250000 topographic map of Antarctica. Scientific Committee on Antarctic Research (SCAR). Since 1993, regularly upgraded and updated.
- British Antarctic Territory. Scale 1:200000 topographic map. DOS 610 Series, Sheet W 67 66. Directorate of Overseas Surveys, Tolworth, UK, 1978.
