= Wilkinson Glacier =

Glacier in Graham Land, Antarctica

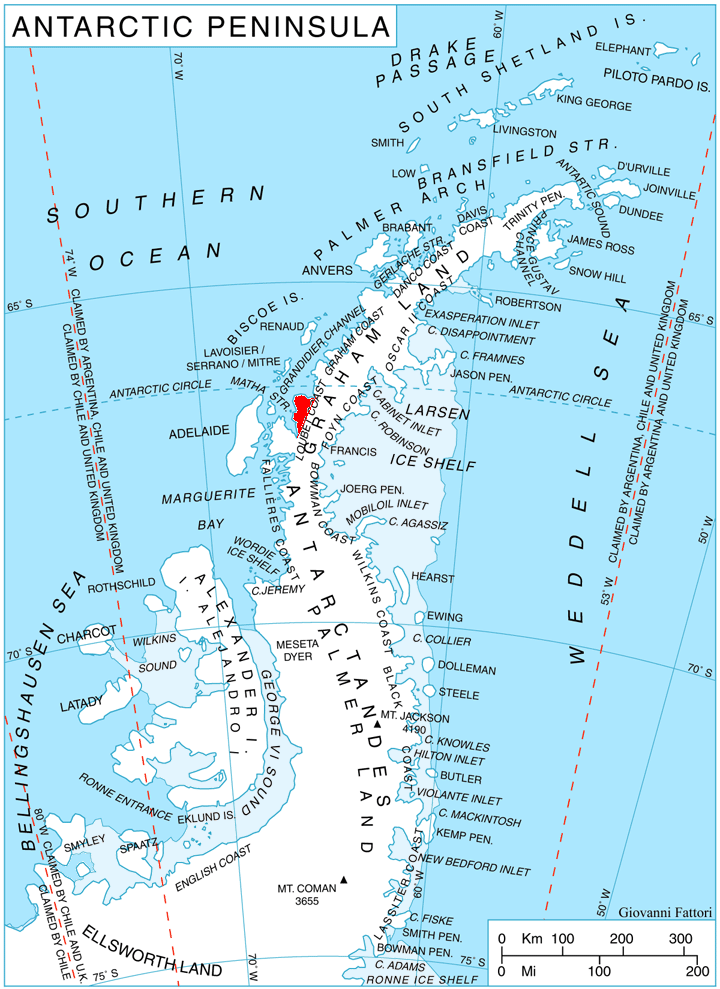
Location of Pernik Peninsula on Loubet Coast, Antarctic Peninsula.

Wilkinson Glacier (66°50′S 66°20′W) is a glacier on the south side of Protector Heights on Pernik Peninsula, Loubet Coast in Graham Land, flowing westward into Lallemand Fjord to the south of Holdfast Point. Mapped from air photos taken by Falkland Islands and Dependencies Aerial Survey Expedition (FIDASE) (1956–57). Named by United Kingdom Antarctic Place-Names Committee (UK-APC) for Captain John V. Wilkinson, Royal Navy, captain of HMS Protector in these waters, 1955–56 and 1956–57.
