= Klebelsberg Glacier =

Glacier in Antarctica

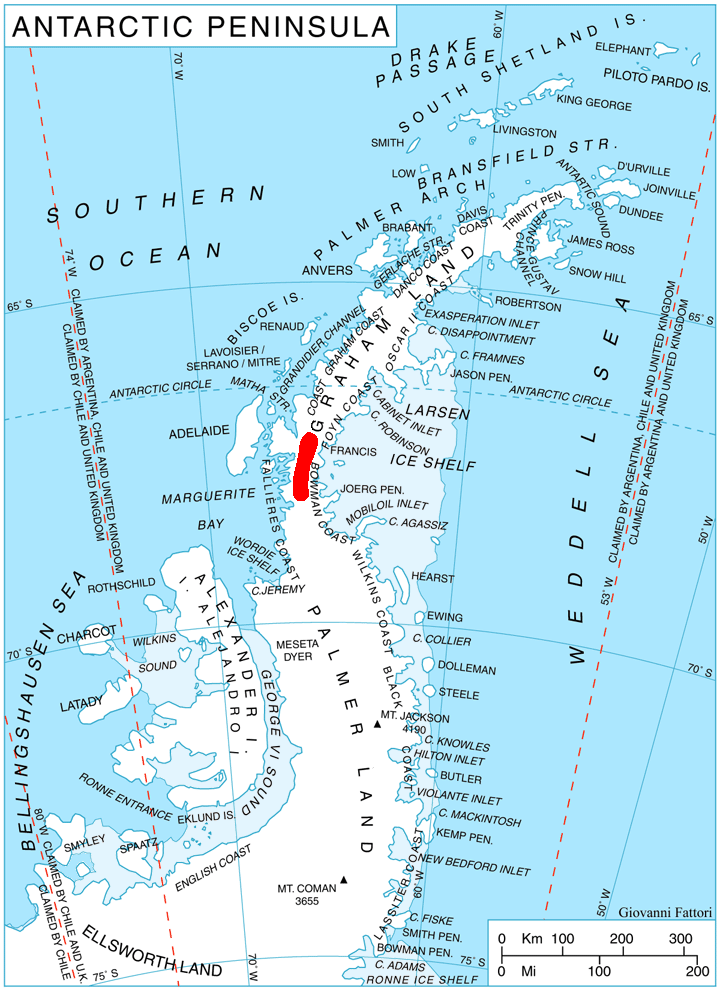
Location of Hemimont Plateau on the Antarctic Peninsula.

Klebelsberg Glacier (67°23′S 66°19′W) is a glacier, 7 nautical miles (13 km) long and 2 nautical miles (4 km) wide, situated at the south side of Finsterwalder Glacier and flowing from Hemimont Plateau northwestward between Armula Peak and Smilyan Bastion on Graham Land, Antarctica, toward the head of Lallemand Fjord. With Finsterwalder Glacier and Haefeli Glacier, its mouth merges with Sharp Glacier where the latter enters the fjord. It was first surveyed from the plateau in 1946–47 by the Falkland Islands Dependencies Survey, and named by them for Raimund von Klebelsberg, an Austrian glaciologist.
