= Hodge Ridge =

Hodge Ridge is a glacial feature located in the south-east of Protector Heights on the Loubet Coast, Antarctica.

It is named thus to commemorate Leading Seaman Reg Hodge of HMS Protector who lost his life on Dec 6th 1963 south of Drake's Passage whilst on active service.

HMS Protector was assisting RSS John Biscoe with seismic research when premature detonation of high explosive depth charges resulted in the deaths of both Reg Hodge and also Michael 'Shady' Lane, a leading seaman charged with the same duties of prepping the explosives.

An account of the incident written by another crew member AB Eddie Large can be read here on the British Antarctic Monument website.

There is also a memorial page to Reg Hodge which can be read here, also on the British Antarctic Monument website.

The trustees of the British Antarctic Monument Trust submitted requests to have features in the Antarctic to be named after both Leading Seaman Reg Hodge and Able Seaman Michael Lane, which were supported by Vice Admiral Sir Barry Wilson.

The map co-ordinates of Hodge Ridge are -66.0153, -66.8219

Both Leading Seaman Reg Hodge and Able Seaman Michael 'Shady' Lane were buried with full military honours in the cemetery, Stanley, Falkland Islands.
