= Mist Rocks =

The Mist Rocks (66°48′S 66°37′W) are a group of insular rocks close northwest of Holdfast Point at the entrance to Lallemand Fjord, Graham Land, Antarctica. They were mapped from air photos taken by the Falkland Islands and Dependencies Aerial Survey Expedition in 1956–57. The name arose locally; the first Falkland Islands Dependencies Survey party sledging north from Detaille Island on August 21, 1956, discovered these rocks by chance while searching in the mist for a secure camp site. It is one of many named rock formations of Graham Land.
