= McCall Point =

Geographical feature in Antarctica

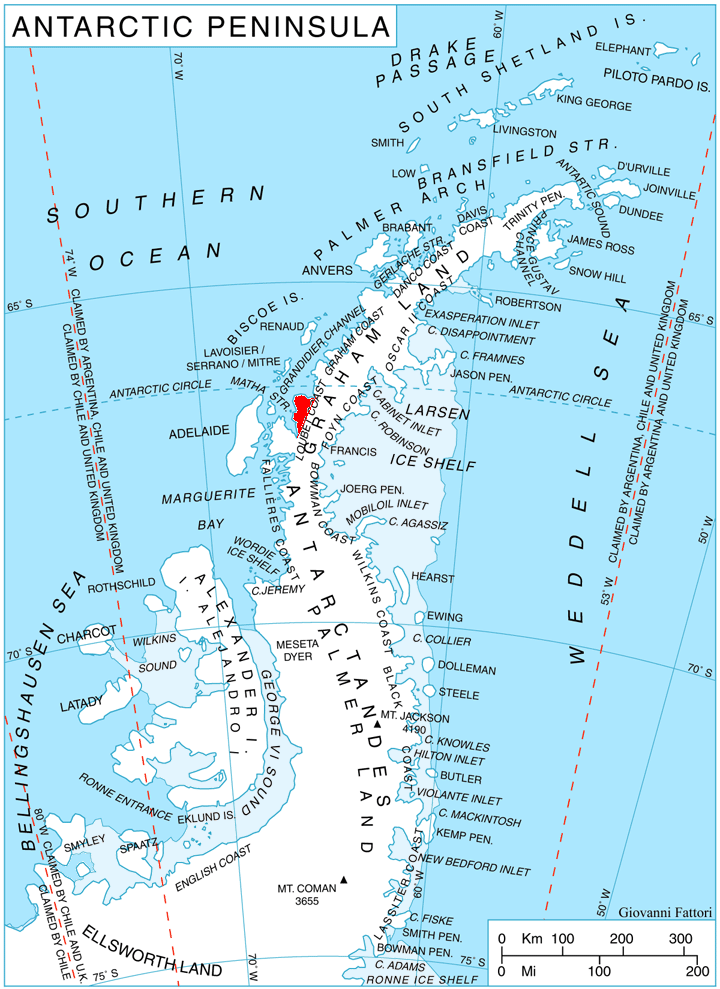
Location of Pernik Peninsula on Loubet Coast, Antarctic Peninsula.

McCall Point (67°2′S 66°38′W) is a point on the east side of Lallemand Fjord, 4 nautical miles (7 km) northwest of Salmon Cove on the west coast of Pernik Peninsula, on the Loubet Coast of Graham Land, Antarctica. It was mapped from air photos taken by the Falkland Islands and Dependencies Aerial Survey Expedition, 1956–57, and was named by the UK Antarctic Place-Names Committee after American engineer John G. McCall (1923–54) of the University of Alaska, who first measured the detailed internal movement of a cirque glacier in 1951–52.
