= Erovete =

Erovete Еровете
- Village
- Location within Bulgaria
- Coordinates: 41.3667°N 25.2833°E
- Country: Bulgaria
- Province: Kardzhali Province
- Municipality: Kirkovo
- Time zone: UTC+2 (EET)
  - Summer (DST): UTC+3 (EEST)

Erovete is a village in Kirkovo Municipality, Kardzhali Province, southern Bulgaria.

== Honours ==
Erovete Peak on Loubet Coast, Antarctica is named after the village.
