= Vasil Kanchov =

Bulgarian geographer, ethnographer and politician

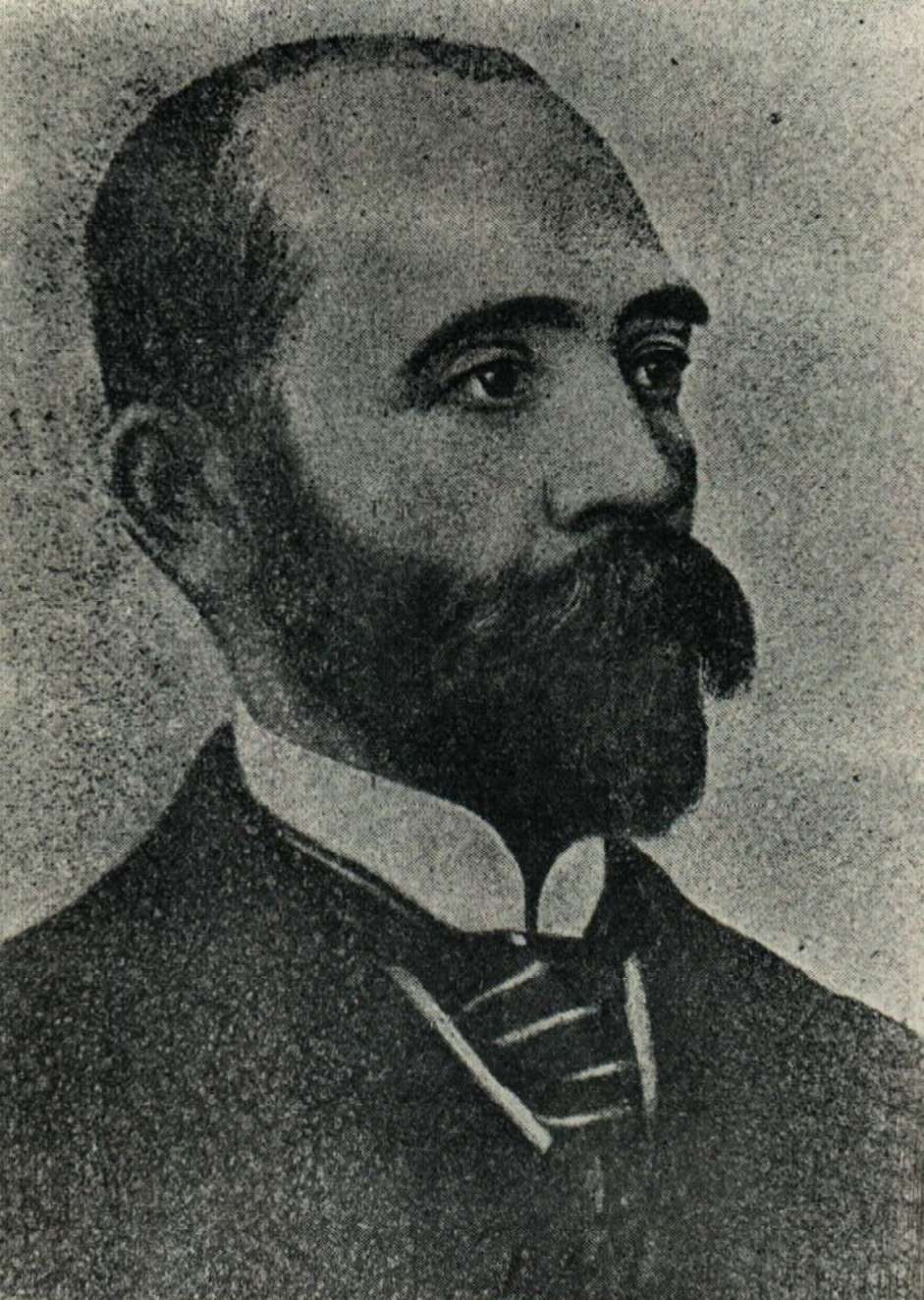
- Born: 26 July 1862
- Died: 6 February 1902 (aged 39)

Vasil Kanchov (Note: Bulgarian: Васил Кънчов, romanized: Vasil Kanchov; Spelled in Old Bulgarian Orthography: Василъ Кѫнчовъ) (26 July 1862 – 6 February 1902) was a geographer, ethnographer and teacher who served as Minister of Education of Bulgaria.

== Early life and education ==
Vasil Kanchov was born in Vratsa. Upon graduating from High school in Lom, Bulgaria, and later he entered the University of Harkov, then in the Russian Empire. During the Serbo-Bulgarian War 1885 he suspended his education and took part in the war. Later, he went on to pursue studies at universities in Munich and Stuttgart, but in 1888 he interrupted his education again due to an illness.

== Career ==
In the following years Kanchov was a Bulgarian teacher in Macedonia. He was a teacher in the Bulgarian Men's High School of Thessaloniki (1888–1891), a director of Bulgarian schools in Serres district (1891–1892), a headmaster of Bulgarian Men's High School of Thessaloniki (1892–1893), а chief school inspector of the Bulgarian schools in Macedonia (1894–1897).

After 1898 Kanchov returned to Bulgaria and went into politics. In the beginning of 1902 he became an educational minister of Bulgaria. He travelled extensively after 1888, visiting and researching all over Macedonia.

== Anatolia travel ==
Vasil Kanchov, who went to Istanbul with the financial support of a Bulgarian magazine at the beginning of 1899, was planning to research and observe the European side of the Marmara, but without giving a full reason, he postponed his visit to the aforementioned region and decided to wander around the Bulgarian settlements on the Anatolian side of the sea Manyas Lake.

He wrote down almost every moment of his 9-day trip. He first went from Istanbul to Mudanya, then to Bursa, then to Karacabey, Bandırma and finally to Gönen, interviewed Bulgarian families, examined the structures of the villages, researched places of worship. The things they wrote had the characteristics of what we can call the "travel book".

== Death ==
Vasil Kanchov was killed in his office by a psychopath.

== In popular culture ==
About him one of the founders of IMRO – Ivan Hadzhinikolov, said that Kanchov once had claimed that he came as a teacher in Thessaloniki to Bulgarianize Macedonia. Hadzhinikolov replied that he was overestimating himself, as Macedonia had long been Bulgarian and that Macedonian Bulgarians had been working for this for a long time.

== Works ==
- The region of Bitola, Prespa and Ohrid. Travel notes.. 1890 ("Битолско, Преспа и Охридско. Пътни бележки").
- The present and the past of the town of Veles. 1892 ("Сегашното и недавнашното минало на гр. Велес").
- Travel along the valleys of Struma, Mesta and Bregalnica. 1894-1896 („Пътуване по долините на Струма, Места и Брегалница“).
- City of Skopje. Notes on His Present and Past. 1898 („Град Скопие. Бележки за неговото настояще и минало“).
- Македония. Етнография и статистика (in Bulgarian). 1900. OCLC 749018540.
- Orohydrography of Macedonia 1911 ("Орохидрография на Македония").

== Honours ==
Kanchov Peak on Loubet Coast, Antarctica is named after Vasil Kanchov.
