= Field Glacier =

Glacier in Antarctica

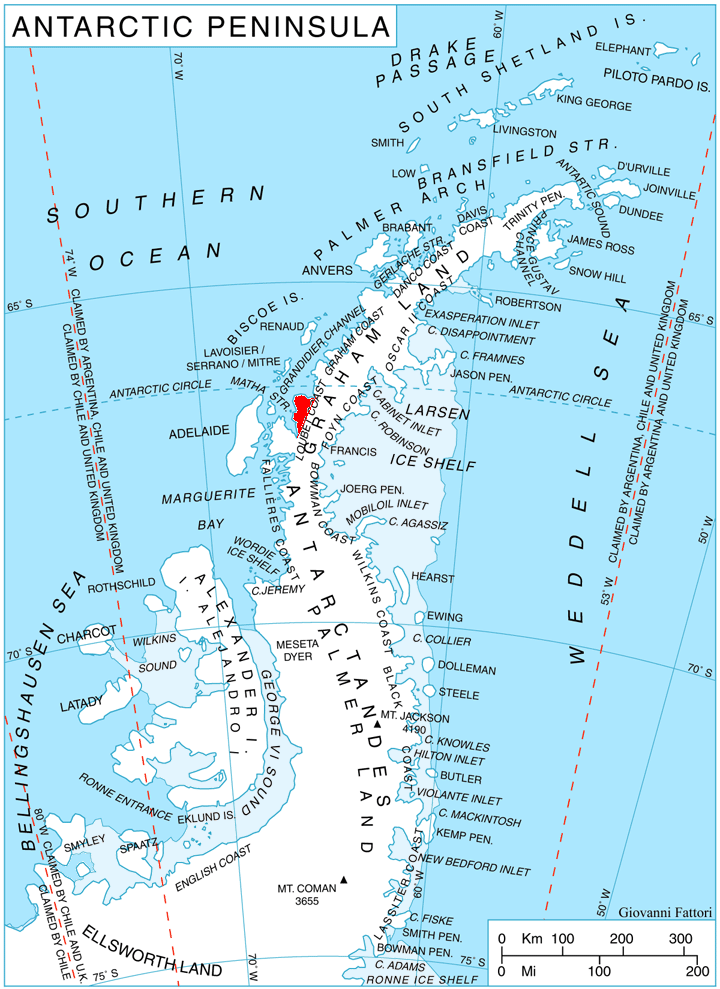
Location of Pernik Peninsula on Loubet Coast, Antarctic Peninsula.

Field Glacier (67°8′S 66°24′W) is a glacier on Pernik Peninsula, Loubet Coast in Graham Land, situated south of Salmon Cove, and flowing west into Lallemand Fjord just south of Kanchov Peak. It was mapped from air photos taken by the Falkland Islands and Dependencies Aerial Survey Expedition, 1956–57. In association with the names of glaciologists grouped in this area, it was named by the UK Antarctic Place-Names Committee after William B.O. Field (born 1904), an American glaciologist and surveyor, sometime Research Fellow of the American Geographical Society.
