= Orford Cliff =

Cliff in Graham Land, Antarctica

Orford Cliff Refuger
- Refuge
- Location of Orford Cliff in Antarctic Peninsula
- Coordinates: 66°54′37″S 66°29′18″W
- Country: United Kingdom
- Location in Antarctica: Lake Fryxell; Taylor Valley; Antarctica
- Administered by: British Antarctic Survey
- Established: 1957
- Demolished: 1959
- Type: Seasonal
- Status: Demolished

Orford Cliff (66°55′S 66°29′W) is a coastal cliff of Pernik Peninsula, Loubet Coast in Graham Land, overlooking the east side of Lallemand Fjord just east of Andresen Island. Surveyed by the Falkland Islands Dependencies Survey (FIDS) in 1956. Named for Michael J.H. Orford, FIDS assistant surveyor at Detaille Island in 1956, who was a member of the party which found a route from Detaille Island to Avery Plateau, via Orford Cliff and Murphy Glacier.

== Orford Cliff Refuge ==
Orford Cliff Refuge (66°54′37″S 66°29′18″W) was a British refuge located in the Lallemand Fjord on the western side of the Antarctic Peninsula. The refuge, managed by the British Antarctic Survey, was inaugurated on 21 February 1957 and remained active intermittently until 10 January 1959. The hut was used by the personnel settled at Station W. The shelter was demolished and removed on 25 March 1997.

== See also ==
- List of Antarctic field camps
- Neb Bluff
