= Roux Island =

Island in Graham Land, Antarctica

- Location within Antarctica

Geography
- Location: Antarctica
- Coordinates: 66°54′S 66°57′W

Administration
- Administered under the Antarctic Treaty System

Demographics
- Population: Uninhabited

Roux Island is an island 3.7 kilometres (2 nmi) long, lying 0.9 kilometres (0.5 nmi) north of Arrowsmith Peninsula at the west side of the entrance to Lallemand Fjord, off the west coast of Graham Land. Discovered by the French Antarctic Expedition under Charcot, 1908–10, who named it for Jules Charles-Roux.

== See also ==
- List of Antarctic and sub-Antarctic islands
