= Holdfast Point =

Point in Graham Land, Antarctica

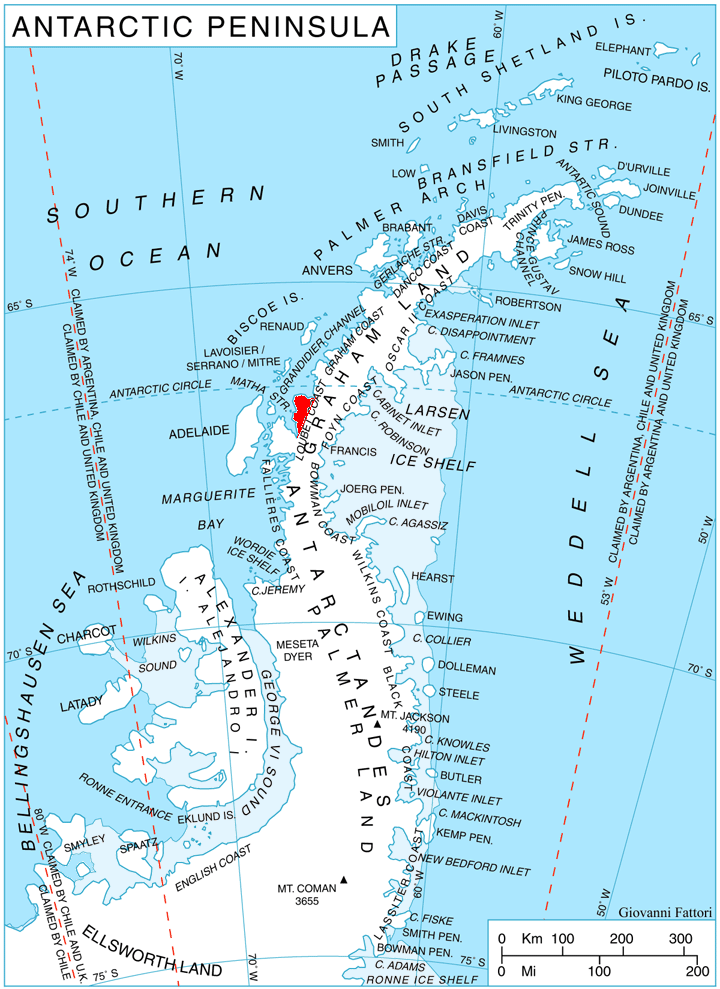
Location of Pernik Peninsula on Loubet Coast, Antarctic Peninsula.

Holdfast Point (66°48′S 66°36′W) is both the northeast side of the entrance to Lallemand Fjord and the northwest side of the entrance to Chepra Cove on Pernik Peninsula in Graham Land, Antarctica, situated about 12 nautical miles (22 km) southwest of Cape Rey. It was mapped from air photos taken by the Falkland Islands and Dependencies Aerial Survey Expedition (1956–57), and was so named because when the pack ice breaks out to the north of Lallemand Fjord, it usually continues to hold fast for some time longer south of this point.

== Maps ==
- Antarctic Digital Database (ADD). Scale 1:250000 topographic map of Antarctica. Scientific Committee on Antarctic Research (SCAR), 1993–2016.
- British Antarctic Territory. Scale 1:200000 topographic map. DOS 610 Series, Sheet W 66 64. Directorate of Overseas Surveys, Tolworth, UK, 1976.

== See also ==
- Mist Rocks, a group of insular rocks close northwest of Holdfast Point
