= Vogel–Fulcher–Tammann equation =

Viscosity equation

The Vogel–Fulcher–Tammann equation, also known as Vogel–Fulcher–Tammann–Hesse equation or Vogel–Fulcher equation (abbreviated: VFT equation), is used to describe the viscosity of liquids as a function of temperature, especially supercooled liquids approaching the glass transition. Glass-forming liquids can stay in a liquid-like state of disorder below their usual melting point if crystallization is prevented, but the viscosity of such a supercooled liquid increases strongly with decreasing temperature.

The VFT equation gives the temperature dependence of the viscosity $\eta$ of a liquid as

$$\eta = \eta_0 \cdot e^{\frac{B}{T - T_\mathrm{VF}}}$$

where $\eta_0$ is the viscosity in the limit where $B \rightarrow 0$ and $B$ is an energy barrier. Both values are empirical material-dependent parameters. $T_\mathrm{VF}$ is also an empirical fitting parameter, and typically lies about 50 °C below the glass transition temperature. These three parameters are normally used as adjustable parameters to fit the VFT equation to experimental data of specific systems. However, some experimental evidence has indicated statistical correlations between these fitting parameters.

An important metric from this equation is the strength parameter $D = B/T_{VT}$, which can relate to fragility of the glass.

This equation is equivalent to the Williams-Landel-Ferry equation which relates viscosity to the fraction of free volume, if free volume decreases linearly with decreasing temperature.

== History ==
The VFT equation is named after Hans Vogel, Gordon Scott Fulcher (1884–1971), and Gustav Tammann (1861–1938) for their contributions to its development. In 1921, Hans Vogel made a brief statement in a journal article that amounted to the VFTH formula, but presented no experimental data. Then in 1925, Gordon Fulcher presented a more complete study, comparing viscosity data from many oxide glasses in the literature to a number of empirical formulas, and in effect chose the VFTH formula as the best. Tammann and Hesse also co-authored an article presenting the same equation in 1926, citing Fulcher but not Vogel. Nonetheless, only Vogel, Fulcher and Tammann were historically credited, with Hesse omitted. In recent years, the naming has been often altered to VFTH to recognize Hesse's contribution.
