= Mount Deeley =

Mountain in Graham Land, Antarctica

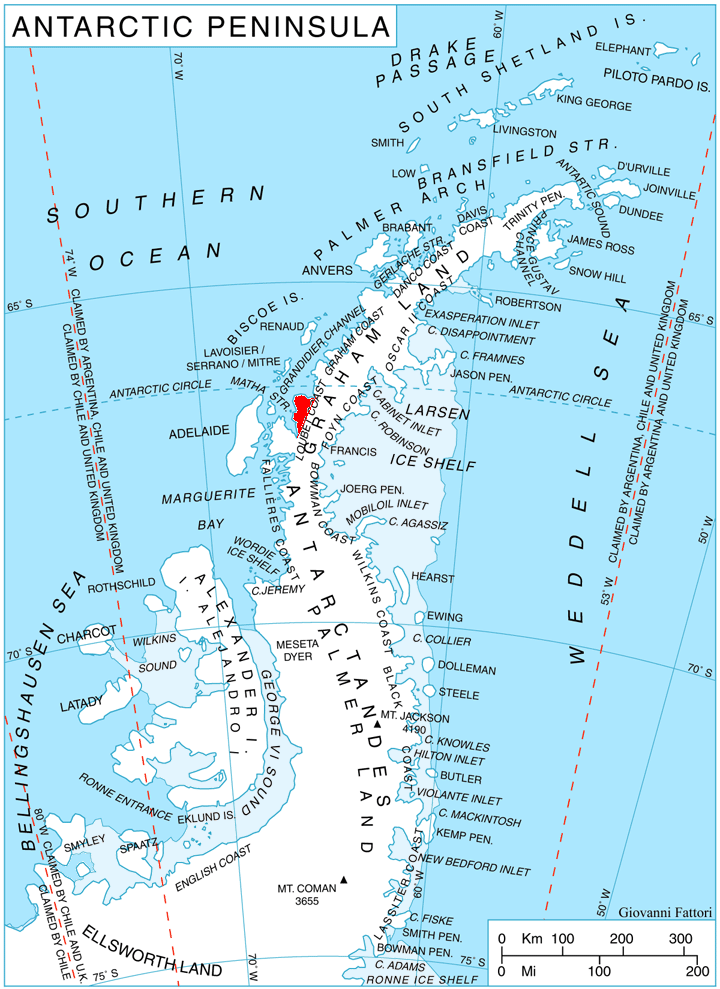
Location of Pernik Peninsula on Loubet Coast, Antarctic Peninsula.

Mount Deeley (67°1′S 66°13′W) is a mountain 2,150 metres (7,050 ft) high, on Pernik Peninsula, Loubet Coast in Graham Land, standing 6 nautical miles (11 km) northeast of Salmon Cove. It was mapped from air photos taken by the Falkland Islands and Dependencies Aerial Survey Expedition of 1956–57, and it was named by the UK Antarctic Place-Names Committee for Richard M. Deeley, a British geologist who made important investigations of the structure and flow of glaciers.
