= Boyle Mountains =

Mountain range in Graham Land, Antarctica

Coordinates: 67°21′S 66°38′W

The Boyle Mountains are a wall of mountains standing between the heads of Lallemand Fjord and Bourgeois Fjord, in Graham Land. They were mapped by the Falkland Islands Dependencies Survey from surveys and from air photos, 1946–59, and named by the UK Antarctic Place-Names Committee for Robert Boyle, the English natural philosopher whose book New Experiments and Observations Touching Cold provided the first major scientific and practical approach to a philosophy of cold in all its aspects.

Quervain Peak is among the peaks in the range.

== See also ==
- Lliboutry Glacier
- Bartholin Peak
