= Haefeli Glacier =

Glacier in Graham Land, Antarctica

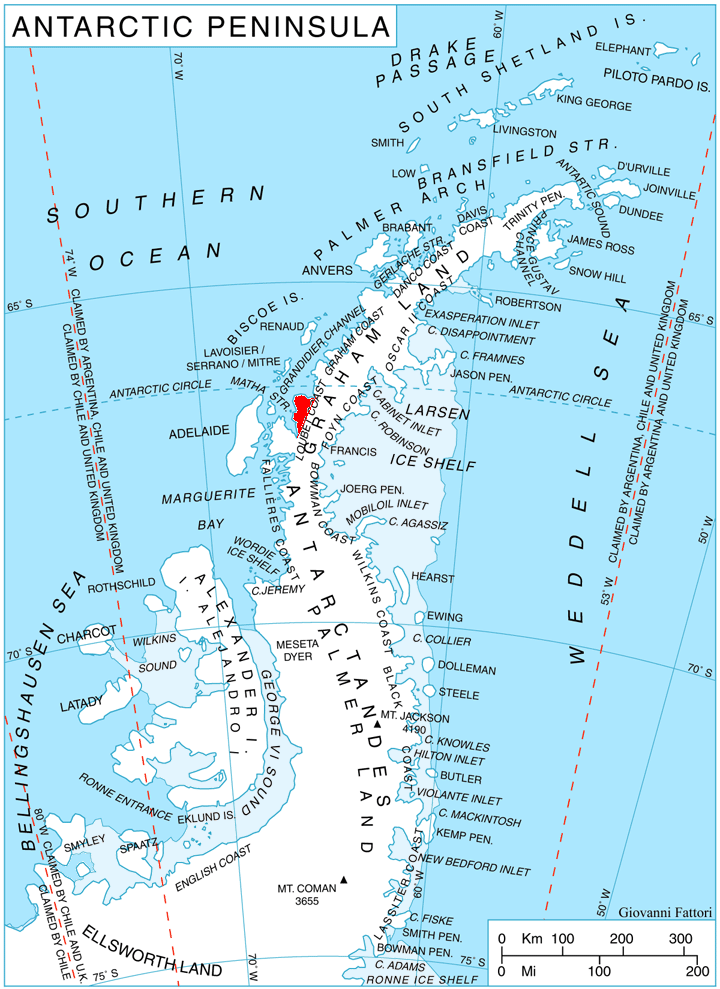
- Location of Pernik Peninsula on Loubet Coast, Antarctic Peninsula

- Location within Antarctica
- Location: Graham Land
- Coordinates: 67°18′S 66°23′W
- Length: 6 nmi (11 km; 7 mi)
- Width: 2 nmi (4 km; 2 mi)
- Thickness: unknown
- Terminus: Lallemand Fjord
- Status: unknown

Haefeli Glacier (67°18′S 66°23′W) is a glacier, 2 miles (3 km) wide and 6 miles (10 km) long, situated on Pernik Peninsula, Loubet Coast in Graham Land, Antarctica, at the northwest side of Finsterwalder Glacier and flowing south-southwest toward the head of Lallemand Fjord. With Finsterwalder and Klebelsberg Glaciers, its mouth merges with Sharp Glacier where the latter enters the fjord. It was first surveyed in 1946–47 by the Falkland Islands Dependencies Survey and named by them for Robert Haefeli, a Swiss glaciologist.

== See also ==
- List of glaciers in the Antarctic
- Glaciology
