= Gustav Heinrich Tammann =

Baltic-German metallurgist (1861–1938)

Gustav Tammann
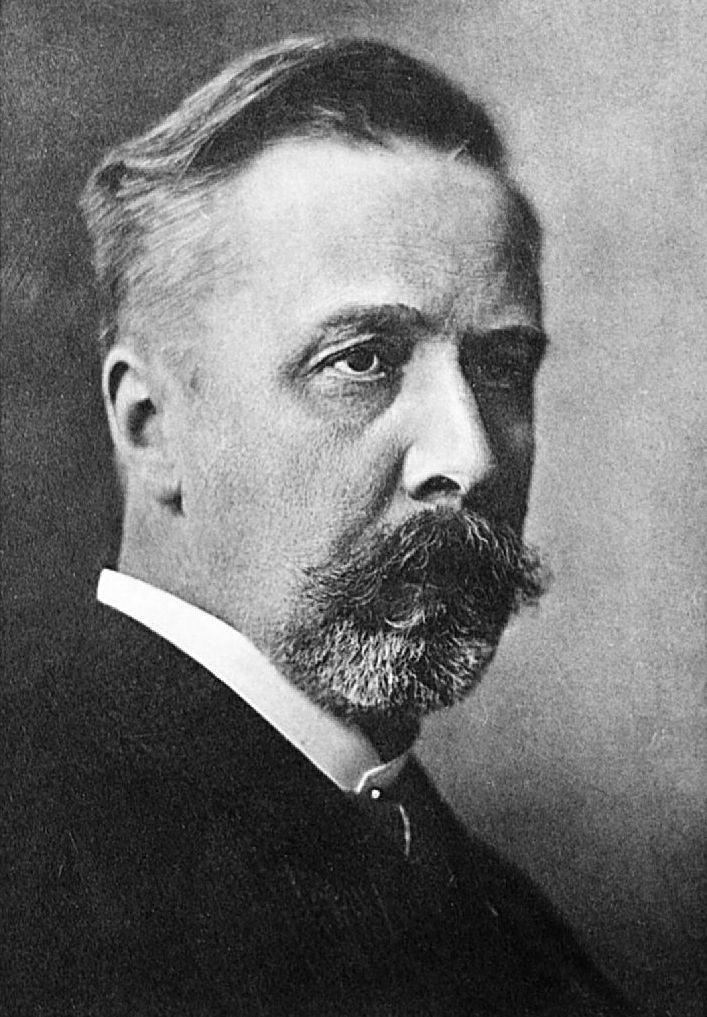
- Gustav Tammann in 1913
- Born: Gustav Heinrich Johann Apollon Tammann; 9 June 1861; Yamburg, Russian Empire
- Died: 17 December 1938 (aged 77); Göttingen, Nazi Germany
- Education: University of Dorpat
- Known for: Tait–Tammann equation of state Vogel-Fulcher-Tammann equation Order-disorder transition
- Relatives: Gustav Andreas Tammann (grandson)
- Awards: Liebig Medal; Heyn Medal; Eagle Shield of the German Empire
- Scientific career
- Fields: Physical chemistry
- Academic advisors: Carl Schmidt
- Doctoral students: Iris Runge

Gustav Heinrich Johann Apollon Tammann (9 June [O.S. 28 May] 1861 – 17 December 1938) was a Baltic German chemist-physicist who made important contributions in the fields of glassy and solid solutions, heterogeneous equilibria, crystallization, and metallurgy. He first predicted the order-disorder transition in alloys.

== Biography ==
Tammann was born in Yamburg (now Kingisepp, Leningrad Oblast). His father, Heinrich Tammann (1833–1864) was of Estonian peasant origin and his mother, Matilda Schünmann, was of German origin. Tammann graduated from University of Dorpat in chemistry. He went to Göttingen University in 1903 where he established the first Institute of Inorganic Chemistry in Germany. In 1908 he was appointed director of the Physico-Chemical Institute.

Tammann died in Göttingen at age 77.

== Research ==
In 1900, he discovered the phases of ice, now known as ice II and ice III.

Later, his interests focused on the physics and physical chemistry of metals and alloys (metallurgy). He was also known for the Vogel–Fulcher–Tammann equation, and the Tait–Tammann equation of state which seeks to account for the compressibility of liquids.

in 1919, Tammann predicted the order-disorder transition that is found in alloys at low temperatures. Tamman and Otto Heusler also observed an anomaly in the specific heat of a bronze alloy in 1926, related to the critical points of the disorder-order transition. This transition was demonstrated in 1929 by C. H. Johannsen and J. O Linde using x-ray diffraction.

== Honours and awards ==
In 1925, Tammann was awarded Liebig Medal. On 28 May 1936, Tammann was awarded the Eagle Shield of the German Empire (Adlerschild des Deutschen Reiches), with dedication "The Doyen of German Metallurgy".

== Awards ==
Tammann was awarded the following prizes:

- Liebig Medal of the Association of German Chemists (Verein Deutscher Chemiker) in 1925
- Heyn Medal of the German Society for Materials Science (Deutsche Gesellschaft für Materialkunde) in 1929
- Eagle Shield of the German Empire in 1936

The Tammann Commemorative Medal of the Deutsche Gesellschaft für Materialkunde is named after him.

== Bibliography ==
- Tammann, G. (1890). Über die Metamerie der Metaphosphate [On the Metamerism of Metaphosphates] (in German). Kaiserlichen Universität Dorpat. hdl:10062/3029.
- —— (1903). Kristallisieren und Schmelzen: ein Beitrag zur Lehre der Änderungen des Aggregatzustandes [Crystallisation and Melting: a Contribution to the Teaching of the Change in the Physical State] (in German). Leipzig: Johann Ambrosius Barth. S2CID 92941631.
- —— (1907). Über die Beziehungen zwischen den inneren Kräften und Eigenschaften der Lösungen: ein Beitrag zur Theorie homogener Systeme [On the Relations between Internal Forces and Properties of the Solution: a Contribution to the Theory of Homogeneous Systems] (in German). Hamburg: Leopold Voss.
- —— (1914). Lehrbuch der Metallographie: Chemie und Physik der Metalle und ihrer Legierungen [Textbook of Metallography: Chemistry and Physics and Metals and their Alloys] (in German). Leipzig: Leopold Voss. DNB-IDN 362391114.
- —— (1919). Die chemischen und galvanischen Eigenschaften von Mischkristallreihen und ihre Atomverteilung: Ein Beitrag zur Kenntnis der Legierungen [The Chemical and Galvanic Properties of Mixed Crystal Series and their Atomic Distribution: A Contribution to the Knowledge of Alloys] (in German). Leipzig: Leopold Voss. DNB-IDN 362391092.
- —— (1919). "Über den Einfluß des Druckes auf die Explosionstemperatur" [On the Influence of Pressure on the Explosion Temperature]. Nachrichten von der Königlichen Gesellschaft der Wissenschaften zu Göttingen, Mathematisch-Physikalische Klasse aus dem Jahre 1919 (in German). Berlin: Weidmannsche Buchhandlung. pp. 220–224.
- —— (1922). Über die Anlauffarben von Metallen [On the Tarnishing of Metals]. Berichte des Werkstoffausschuß (in German). Düsseldorf: Verein deutscher Eisenhüttenleute. DNB-IDN 362863512.
- —— (1922). Über die Diffusion des Kohlenstoffs in Metalle und die Mischkristalle des Eisens (Nach von K. Schönert ausgeführten Versuchen) [On the Diffusion of Carbon in Metals and the Mixed Crystals of Iron (based on Experiments carried out by K. Schönert)]. Berichte des Werkstoffausschuß (in German). Düsseldorf: Verein deutscher Eisenhüttenleute. DNB-IDN 362863520.
- —— (1922). Die spontane Passivität der Chromstähle [The Spontaneous Passivity of Chromium Steels]. Berichte des Werkstoffausschuß (in German). Düsseldorf: Verein deutscher Eisenhüttenleute. DNB-IDN 362863547.
- —— (1922). Die Umwandlung des Zementits bei 210 °C [The Transformation of Cementite at 210 °C]. Berichte des Werkstoffausschuß (in German). Düsseldorf: Verein deutscher Eisenhüttenleute. DNB-IDN 362863555.
- —— (1922). Aggregatzustände: Die Zustandsänderungen der Materie in Abhängigkeit von Druck und Temperatur [States of Matter: The Changes in the State of Matter as a Function of Pressure and Temperature] (in German). Leipzig: Leopold Voss. DNB-IDN 576624160.
- —— (1924). Lehrbuch der heterogenen Gleichgewichte [Textbook of Heterogeneous Equilibria] (in German). Braunschweig: Vieweg & Solm. DNB-IDN 576624195.
- ——; Heinzel, A. (1928). Die Kristalliten-Orientierung gereckter und gestauchter Metalle und die kristallographische Deutung der Gleitvorgänge beim Recken, Stauchen und Walzen von Metallen [The Crystallite Orientation of Stretched and Compressed Metals, and the Crystallographic Interpretation of the Sliding Processes during Stretching, Upsetting, and Rolling of Metals]. Berichte des Werkstoffausschuß des Verein deutscher Eisenhüttenleute (in German). Düsseldorf: Verlag Stahleisen. DNB-IDN 362863539.
- —— (1930). "Zur Molekular-Dynamik in Kristallen" [On Molecular Dynamics in Crystals]. Nachrichten von der Gesellschaft der Wissenschaften zu Göttingen aus dem Jahre 1930, Mathematisch-Physikalische Klasse (in German). Berlin: Weidmannsche Buchhandlung. pp. 227–254.
- —— (1931). Physikalisch-chemische Unterlagen zur Beurteilung der Beziehungen zwischen Stahlbad und Schlacke [Physico-chemical Documentation for Assessing the Relationship between Steel Bath and Slag]. Berichte des Stahlwerksausschußes des Verein deutscher Eisenhüttenleute (in German). Düsseldorf: Verlag Stahleisen. DNB-IDN 362863563.
- ——; Oelsen, W. (1931). Die Verteilung der Eisenbegleiter zwischen Stahlbad und Schlacke bei der Stahlerzeugung [The Distribution of the Accompanying Iron Between the Steel Bath and Slag in Steel Production]. Berichte des Stahlwerksausschußes des Verein deutscher Eisenhüttenleute (in German). Düsseldorf: Verlag Stahleisen. DNB-IDN 362863571.
- —— (1932). "Zur Entwicklung der Metallkunde: Vortrag, gehalten in der öffentlichen Sitzung am 7. Nov. 1931" [On the Development of Metallurgy: Lecture given in the public session on 7 Nov 1931]. Sonderdrucke aus den Nachrichten von der Gesellschaft der Wissenschaften zu Göttingen, Geschäftliche Mitteilungen (in German). Berlin: Weidmannsche Buchhandlung. pp. 38–49. DNB-IDN 365102091.
- ——; Bandel, G. (1933). Sichtbarmachung des Primärgefüges der Stähle durch Zusatz von radioaktivem Thorium B [Visualization of the Primary Structure of the Steel by Adding Radioactive Thorium B] (in German). Düsseldorf: Verlag Stahleisen. DNB-IDN 362391130.
- —— (1933). Der Glaszustand [The Glassy State] (in German). Leipzig: Leopold Voss. DNB-IDN 576624187.
- ——; Bandel, G. (1934). Wärmeinhalt und spezifisches Volumen der Eisen-Kohlenstoff-Legierungen [Heat Content and Specific Volume of Iron-Carbon Alloys] (in German). Düsseldorf: Verlag Stahleisen. DNB-IDN 36286358X.
- ——; Bandel, G. (1934). "Die Schmelz- und Umwandlungskurven der Eisarten aus schwerem Wasser" [The Melting and Transformation Curves of the Ice Species of Heavy Water]. Nachrichten von der Gesellschaft der Wissenschaften zu Göttingen aus dem Jahre 1934, Mathematisch-Physikalische Klasse (in German). Berlin: Weidmannsche Buchhandlung. pp. 23–38. DNB-IDN 365102113.

== See also ==
- Tammann temperature
- Tammann Peaks
