= Bartholin Peak =

Mountain peak in Graham Land, Antarctica

Highest point
- Elevation: 1,946 m (6,385 ft)
- Prominence: 1,479 m (4,852 ft)
- Listing: Ribu

Bartholin Peak (67°17′S 66°42′W) is a conspicuous peak near the north end of the Boyle Mountains in Graham Land. It was named by the UK Antarctic Place-Names Committee in 1958 for Erasmus Bartholin, of Copenhagen, whose De Figura Nivis Dissertatio, 1661, includes the earliest known scientific description of snow crystals.
