= Hooke Point =

Point in Graham Land, Antarctica

Hooke Point (67°11′S 66°42′W) is a point near the head of Lallemand Fjord, in Graham Land, Antarctica. It was mapped by the Falkland Islands Dependencies Survey from surveys and air photos, 1946–59, and was named by the UK Antarctic Place-Names Committee for Robert Hooke, an English experimental physicist and author of Micrographia, which contains one of the earliest known descriptions of ice crystals.
