= Finsterwalder Glacier =

Glacier in Graham Land, Antarctica

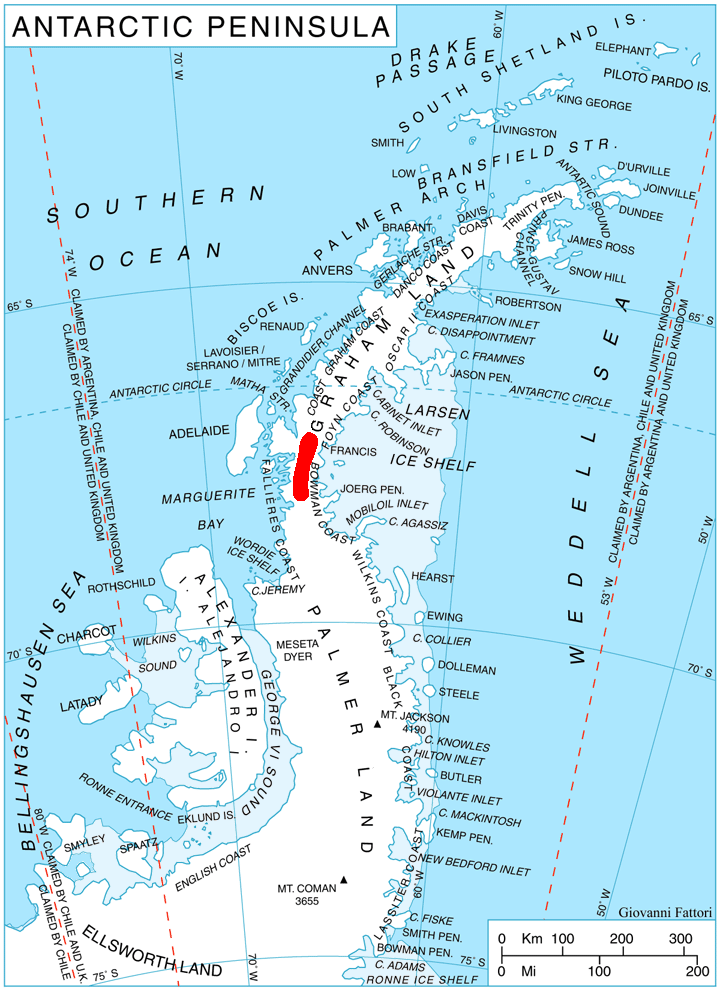
- Location of Hemimont Plateau on the Antarctic Peninsula

- Location within Antarctica
- Location: Graham Land
- Coordinates: 79°30′S 84°49′W
- Length: 10 nautical miles (19 km; 12 mi)
- Width: 2 nautical miles (4 km; 2 mi)
- Thickness: unknown
- Terminus: Sharp Glacier
- Status: unknown

Finsterwalder Glacier (67°19′S 66°20′W) is a glacier on the northwest side of Hemimont Plateau, 2 nautical miles (4 km; 2 mi) wide and 10 nautical miles (19 km; 12 mi) long, flowing southwest from the central plateau of Graham Land, Antarctica, toward the head of Lallemand Fjord. Its mouth lies between the mouths of Haefeli Glacier and Klebelsberg Glacier, the three glaciers merging with Sharp Glacier where the latter enters the fjord. It was first surveyed from the plateau in 1946–47 by the Falkland Islands Dependencies Survey, and named by them for Sebastian Finsterwalder and his son, Richard Finsterwalder, German glaciologists.

== See also ==
- List of glaciers in the Antarctic
- Glaciology
