= Quervain Peak =

Mountain in Antarctica

Quervain Peak (67°23′S 66°39′W) is a peak in the central part of the Boyle Mountains in Graham Land, Antarctica. Mapped by Falkland Islands Dependencies Survey (FIDS) from surveys and air photos, 1956–59, it was named by the United Kingdom Antarctic Place-Names Committee (UK-APC) for Alfred de Quervain, a Swiss glaciologist who in 1909 first applied photogrammetric methods to the measurement of surface glacier flow.
