= Salmon Cove (Antarctica) =

Body of water in Graham Land, Antarctica

Salmon Cove (67°06′00″S 66°28′00″W) is a cove 4 nautical miles (7.4 km) southeast of McCall Point on the east side of Lallemand Fjord in Graham Land. It was mapped by the Falkland Islands Dependencies Survey from surveys and air photos, 1956–59. It was named by the UK Antarctic Place-names Committee for Eric M.P. Salmon, an assistant Falklands Islands Dependencies Survey meteorologist who spent several seasons in Antarctica between 1950 and 1956, and visited this cove in 1956.
