= Sharp Glacier =

Glacier in Graham Land, Antarctica

- Location within Antarctica
- Location: Graham Land
- Coordinates: 67°20′S 66°27′W
- Thickness: unknown
- Terminus: Lallemand Fjord
- Status: unknown

Sharp Glacier is a glacier flowing north to the head of Lallemand Fjord, close east of the Boyle Mountains, in Graham Land. Mapped by Falkland Islands Dependencies Survey (FIDS) from surveys and air photos, 1948–59. Named by United Kingdom Antarctic Place-Names Committee (UK-APC) for Robert P. Sharp, American geologist who has undertaken numerous studies on glaciers and their flow.
