= Protector Heights =

Mountain range in Graham Land, Antarctica

Coordinates: 66°42′S 66°15′W

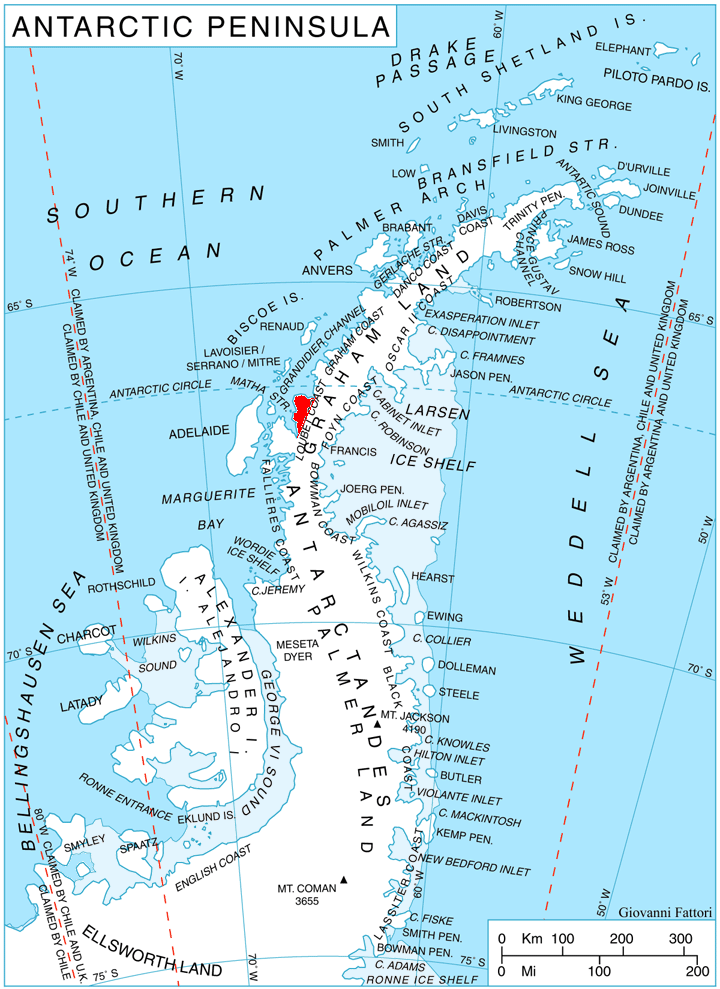
Location of Pernik Peninsula on Loubet Coast, Antarctic Peninsula.

Protector Heights are mountainous coastal heights (2,245 m) on Pernik Peninsula, Antarctica, which are separated from the Graham Land plateau by a narrow col, dominating the area between Wilkinson Glacier and southern Darbel Bay. Mapped from air photos taken by Falkland Islands and Dependencies Aerial Survey Expedition (FIDASE) (1956–57). Named by United Kingdom Antarctic Place-Names Committee (UK-APC) after HMS work and served in the Antarctic every season from 1955 until 1967.
