= Detaille Island =

Island off the coast of Antarctica

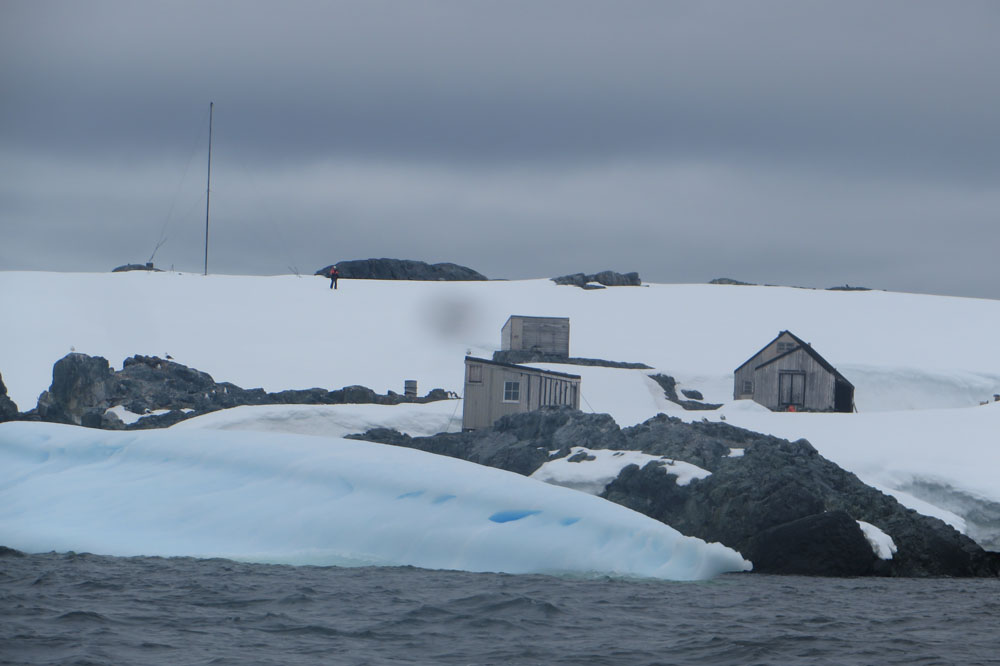
- Detaille Island, Antarctica

- Location within Antarctic Peninsula

Geography
- Location: Antarctica
- Coordinates: 66°52′S 66°47′W

Administration
- Administered under the Antarctic Treaty System

Demographics
- Population: Uninhabited

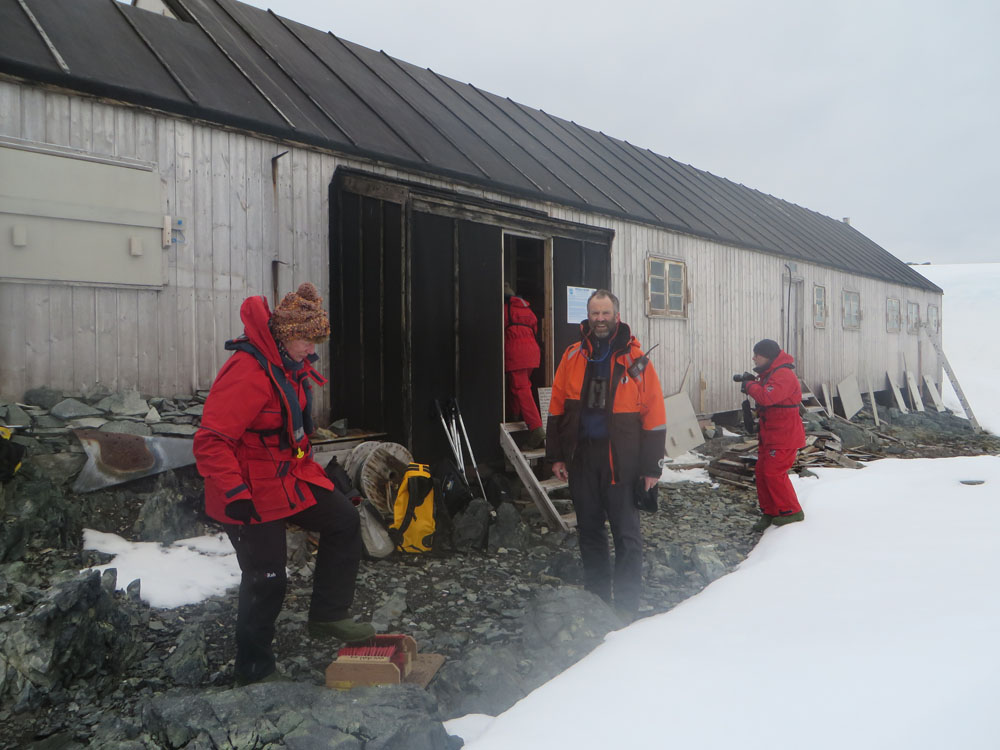
Tourists visit Base W on Detaille Island

Detaille Island is a small island off the northern end of the Arrowsmith Peninsula in Graham Land, Antarctica. From 1956 to 1959 it was home to "Base W" of the British Antarctic Survey and closed after the end of the International Geophysical Year (IGY). Detaille was a key monitoring sites during the IGY. It is now often visited by Antarctic cruise ships but is otherwise unoccupied.

Because the men departed hastily and could take little with them, Base W remains an eerily preserved time capsule of 1950s Antarctic life. It was intended to support dog-sledging survey parties crossing the sea ice to the nearby Antarctic Peninsula, but the ice proved dangerously unstable. When Base W was vacated, heavy sea ice prevented resupply ship John Biscoe from approaching closer than 50 kilometres (31 mi), despite the assistance of two U.S. icebreakers. So the men were forced to close up the base, load sledges with only their most valuable gear and use dog teams to reach the ship.

== Base W ==
Base W
- Antarctic research station
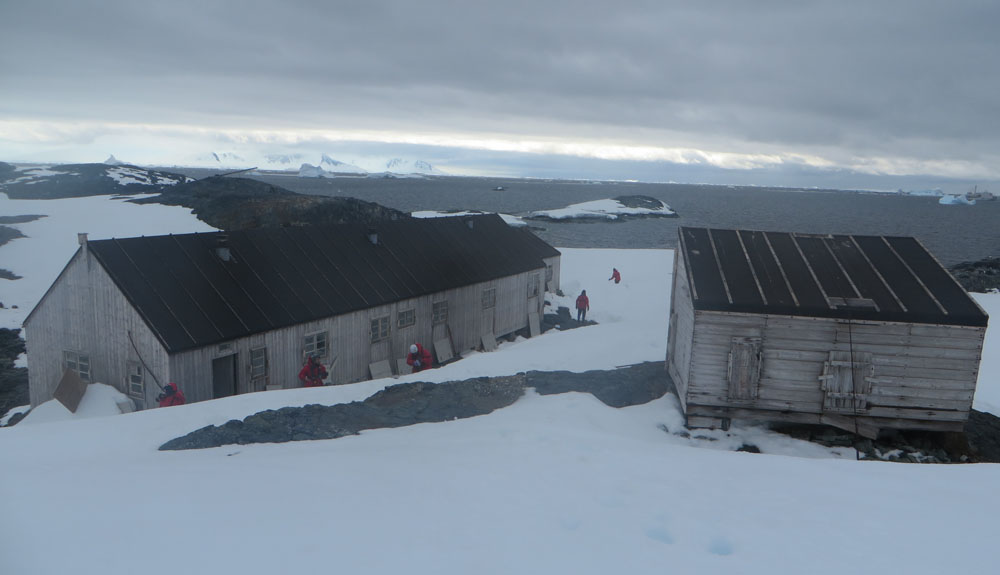
- Interactive map of Base W
- Coordinates: 66°52′01″S 66°47′53″W
- Established: 1956
- Closed: 1 April 1959

Government
  - Type: Administration
  - Body: BAS, United Kingdom
- Active times: All year-round

Station W was established in 1956 as a British research station primarily for survey, geology and meteorology and to contribute to the International Geophysical Year in 1957. It consists of a hut and associated structures and outbuildings, including a small emergency storage building, bitch and pup pens, anemometer tower, and two tubular steel radio masts. As a relatively unaltered research station of the late 1950s, it provides a reminder of the science and living conditions that existed when the Antarctic Treaty was first signed in 1959.

In 2009, the base was designated a Historic Site and Monument (HSM 83) with the name Base W, following a proposal by the United Kingdom to the Antarctic Treaty Consultative Meeting.

Artefacts include a Hoover washing machine with instruction manuals, jackets and longjohns, a calendar from December 1957, survey books, astronomical observation logs, radio communication equipment, numerous books, dozens of paint-size cans of Scotch oats, bottles of Heinz mayonnaise, and empty bottles of gin and whisky.

Detaille Island is maintained by the United Kingdom Antarctic Heritage Trust. The organization works to conserve Antarctic buildings and artefacts, and to promote and encourage the public's interest in its Antarctic heritage.

The normal occupancy of Station W was eight to 10 people, according to an information panel. In addition to the main building, there are two nearby huts. One was used as an emergency store and the other to keep dogs.

Detaille Island was surveyed by the 1908-1910 French Antarctic Expedition and named Îlot Detaille after M. Detaille, a French resident of Punta Arenas and shareholder in the Sociedad Ballenera Magallanes (Magellan Whaling Company), who assisted the expedition to obtain supplies at Deception Island.

The island was re-surveyed by the Falkland Islands Dependencies Survey (FIDS and the precursor to British Antarctic Survey) from John Biscoe in February 1956 and the name Lent Islands was applied to this along with some off-lying islands as Lent was beginning on 15 February in 1956.

A FIDS station, originally called "Base W" or "Loubet Coast" (later "Detaille Island"), was established on the island on 24 February 1956 and occupied continuously until 1 April 1959.

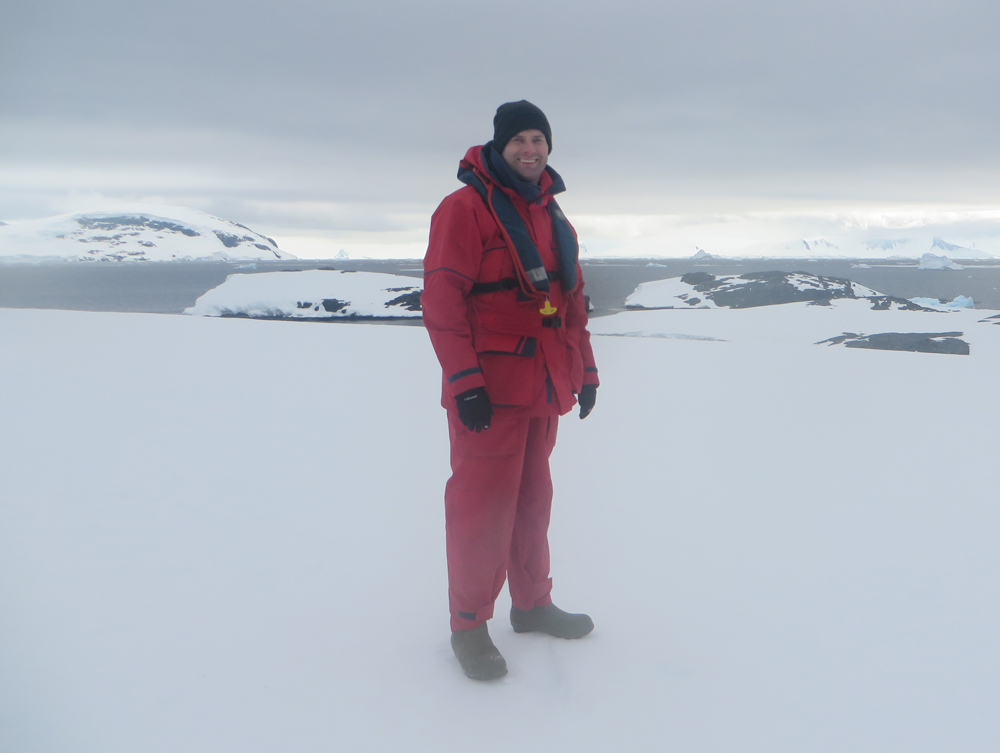
Detaille Island, Antarctica

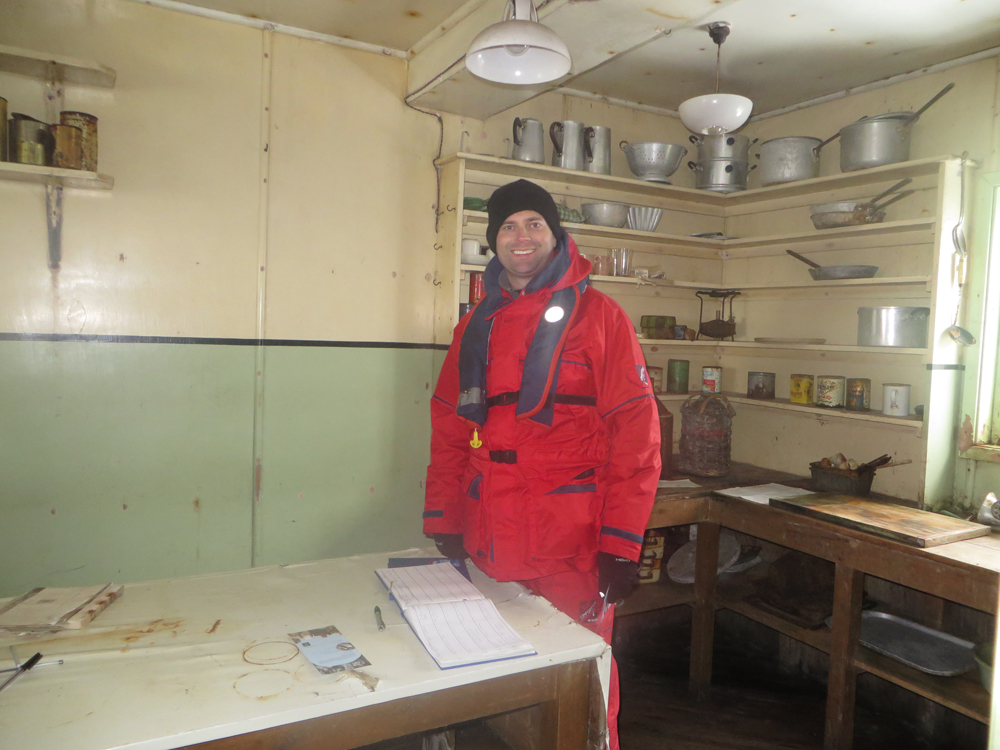
Kitchen of Base W on Detaille Island

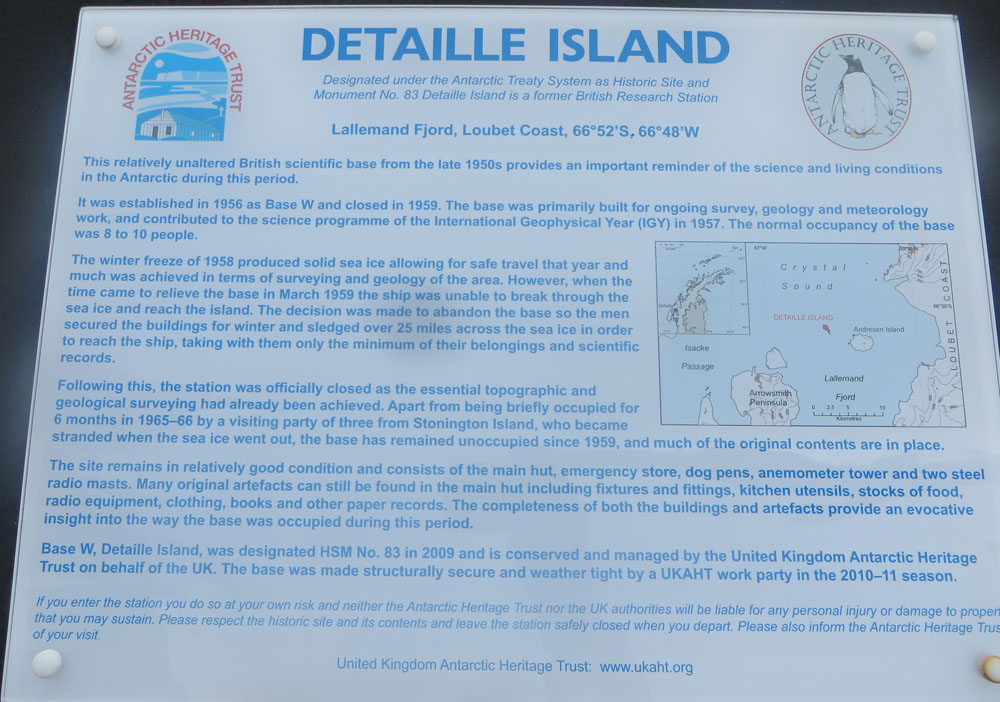
Historical marker at Base W on Detaille Island

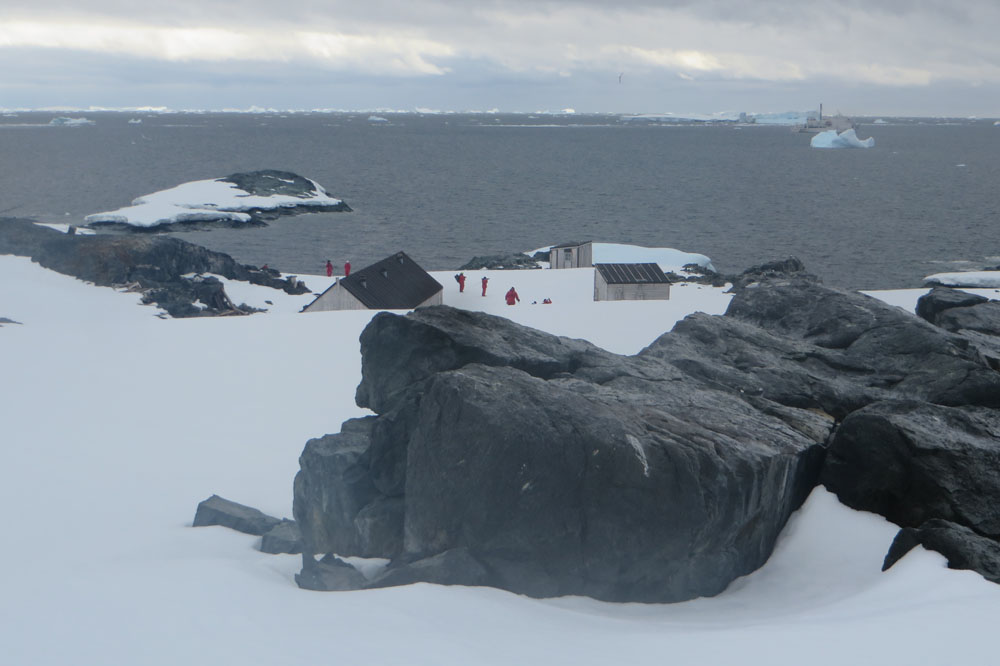
Detaille Island, Antarctica

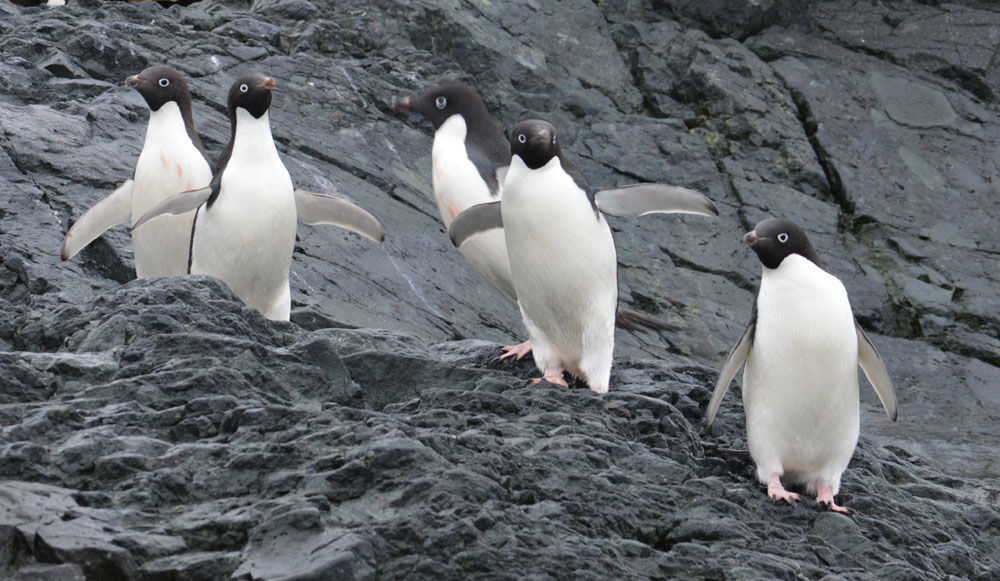
Adelie penguins on Detaille Island

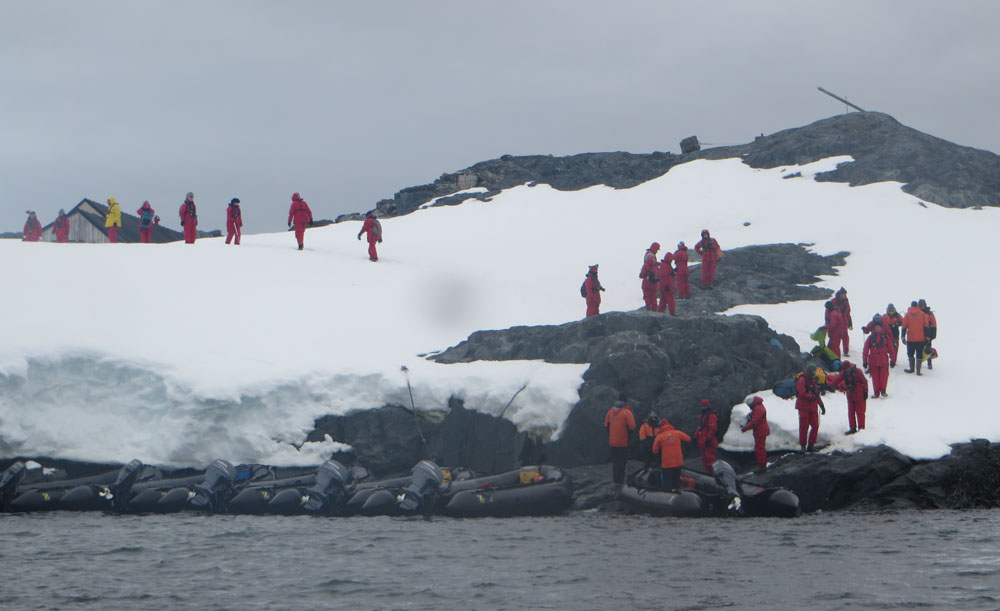
Tourists visit Detaille Island

== See also ==
- List of Antarctic and subantarctic islands
- List of Antarctic research stations
- List of Antarctic field camps
- Crime in Antarctica
