= Lallemand Fjord =

Fjord in Loubet Coast, Antarctic Peninsula

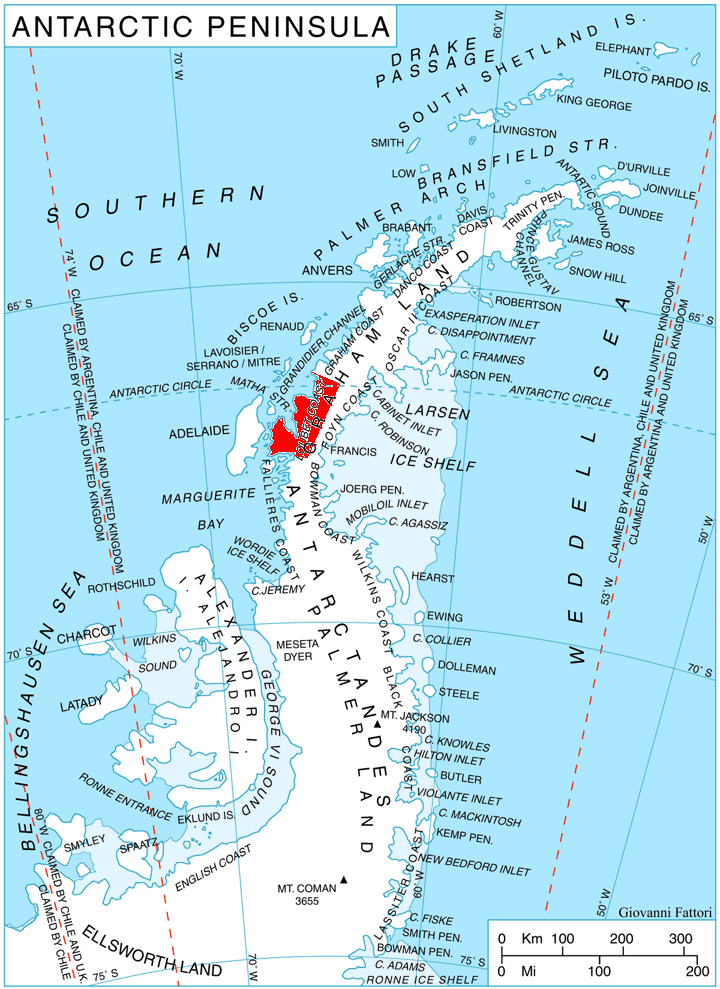
Location of Loubet Coast on the Antarctic Peninsula.

The Lallemand Fjord (67°06′S 66°42′W) is a fjord located east of Arrowsmith Peninsula and west of Pernik Peninsula on Loubet Coast on the western side of the Antarctic Peninsula, Antarctica. It begins at Sharp Glacier and runs over 48 km roughly south to north, flowing into Crystal Sound near Detaille Island, and entered between Roux Island and Holdfast Point. The fjord was named by Jean-Baptiste Charcot after the French geographer Charles Lallemand.

== Glaciers ==
Haefeli Glacier, Finsterwalder Glacier, Sharp Glacier, Sölch Glacier, Wilkinson Glacier, Koriten Glacier, Dabrava Glacier, Brückner Glacier and Antevs Glacier feed the fjord.

== See also ==
- Shmidt Point

== Maps ==
- British Antarctic Territory. Scale 1:200000 topographic map. DOS 610 Series, Sheet W 66 66. Directorate of Overseas Surveys, Tolworth, UK, 1976.
- Antarctic Digital Database (ADD). Scale 1:250000 topographic map of Antarctica. Scientific Committee on Antarctic Research (SCAR). Since 1993, regularly upgraded and updated.
