= Pernik Peninsula =

Peninsula of Loubet Coast, Antarctic Peninsula

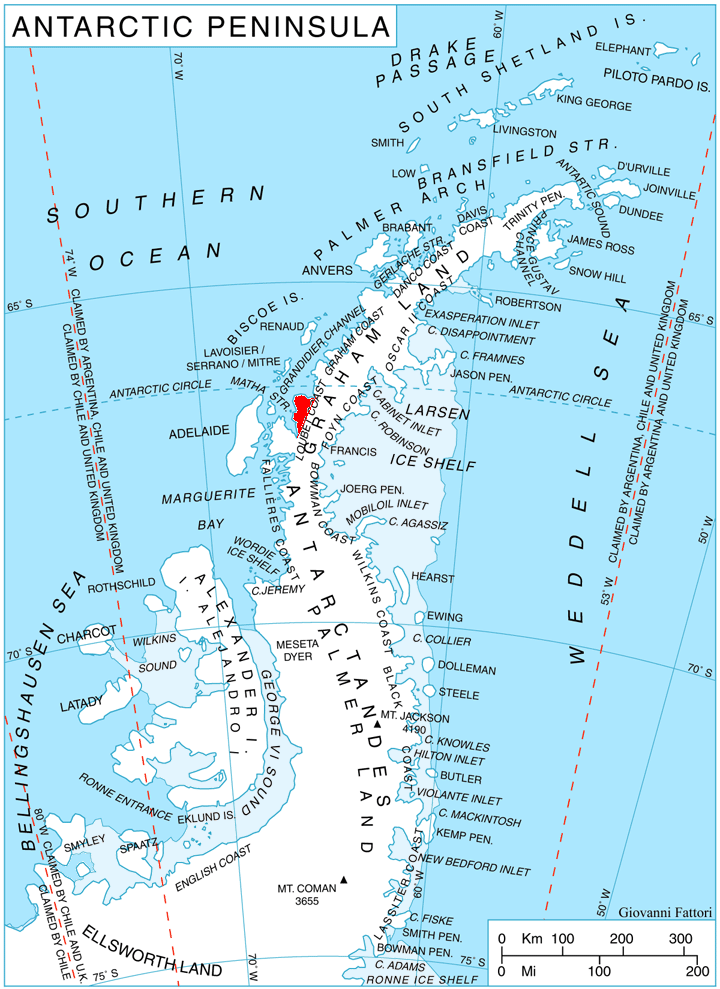
Location of Pernik Peninsula on Loubet Coast, Antarctic Peninsula.

Pernik Peninsula (Bulgarian: полуостров Перник, romanized: poluostrov Pernik, IPA: [poɫuˈɔstrof ˈpɛrnik]) is the ice-covered peninsula projecting 40 km in northwest direction from Loubet Coast on the west side of Antarctic Peninsula. It is bounded by Darbel Bay to the northeast, Lallemand Fjord to the west and Crystal Sound to the northwest, and its northern part is dominated by Protector Heights.

The peninsula is named after the city of Pernik in Western Bulgaria.

== Location ==
Pernik Peninsula is centred at 66°45′50″S 66°12′00″W. British mapping in 1976.

== Maps ==
- British Antarctic Territory. Scale 1:200000 topographic map. DOS 610 Series, Sheet W 66 66. Directorate of Overseas Surveys, Tolworth, UK, 1976.
- Antarctic Digital Database (ADD). Scale 1:250000 topographic map of Antarctica. Scientific Committee on Antarctic Research (SCAR). Since 1993, regularly upgraded and updated.
