= Loubet Coast =

Coast in Graham Land, Antarctica

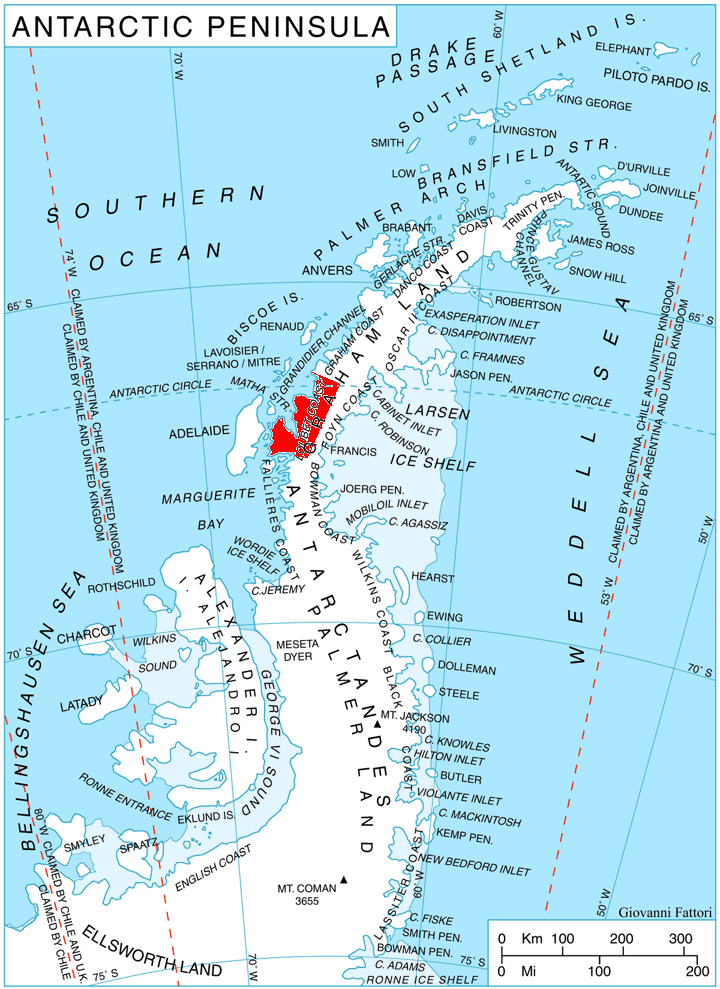
Location of Loubet Coast on the Antarctic Peninsula.

Loubet Coast is the portion of the west coast of Graham Land in Antarctic Peninsula, extending 158 km between Cape Bellue to the northeast and Bourgeois Fjord to the southwest. South of Loubet Coast is Fallières Coast, north is Graham Coast.

The coast is named after Émile Loubet, President of France during the exploration of the area by the French Antarctic Expedition under Jean-Baptiste Charcot in January 1905.

== Location ==
Loubet Coast is centred at 67°00′S 66°00′W. British mapping in 1976 - 78.

== Maps ==
- British Antarctic Territory. Scale 1:200000 topographic map. DOS 610 Series, Sheet W 66 64. Directorate of Overseas Surveys, Tolworth, UK, 1976.
- British Antarctic Territory. Scale 1:200000 topographic map. DOS 610 Series, Sheet W 66 66. Directorate of Overseas Surveys, Tolworth, UK, 1976.
- British Antarctic Territory. Scale 1:200000 topographic map. DOS 610 Series, Sheet W 67 66. Directorate of Overseas Surveys, Tolworth, UK, 1978.
