= Mount Kozyak =

Mountain in Graham Land, Antarctica

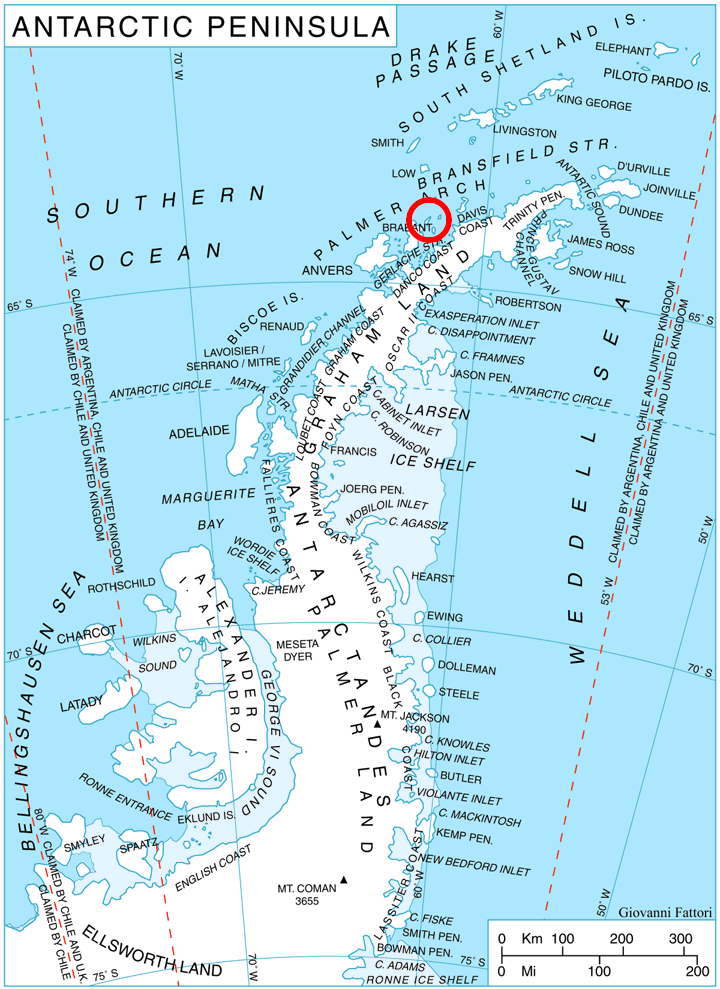
Location of Liège Island in the Antarctic Peninsula region.

Mount Kozyak (Bulgarian: връх Козяк, romanized: vrah Kozyak, IPA: [ˈvrɤx ˈkɔzʲɐk]) is the ice-covered peak rising to 709 m in Brugmann Mountains on Liège Island in the Palmer Archipelago, Antarctica. It surmounts Coria Cove to the northeast, Beripara Cove to the south and Sigmen Glacier to the northwest.

The feature is named after the settlement of Kozyak in Northeastern Bulgaria.

== Location ==
Mount Kozyak is located at 64°01′29″S 61°54′50″W, which is 1.67 km south of Vazharov Peak, 1.72 km northwest of Leshko Point and 3.5 km northeast of Pavlov Peak. British mapping in 1978.

== Maps ==
- British Antarctic Territory. Scale 1:200000 topographic map. DOS 610 Series, Sheet W 64 60. Directorate of Overseas Surveys, UK, 1978.
- Antarctic Digital Database (ADD). Scale 1:250000 topographic map of Antarctica. Scientific Committee on Antarctic Research (SCAR). Since 1993, regularly upgraded and updated.
