= Mishev Bluff =

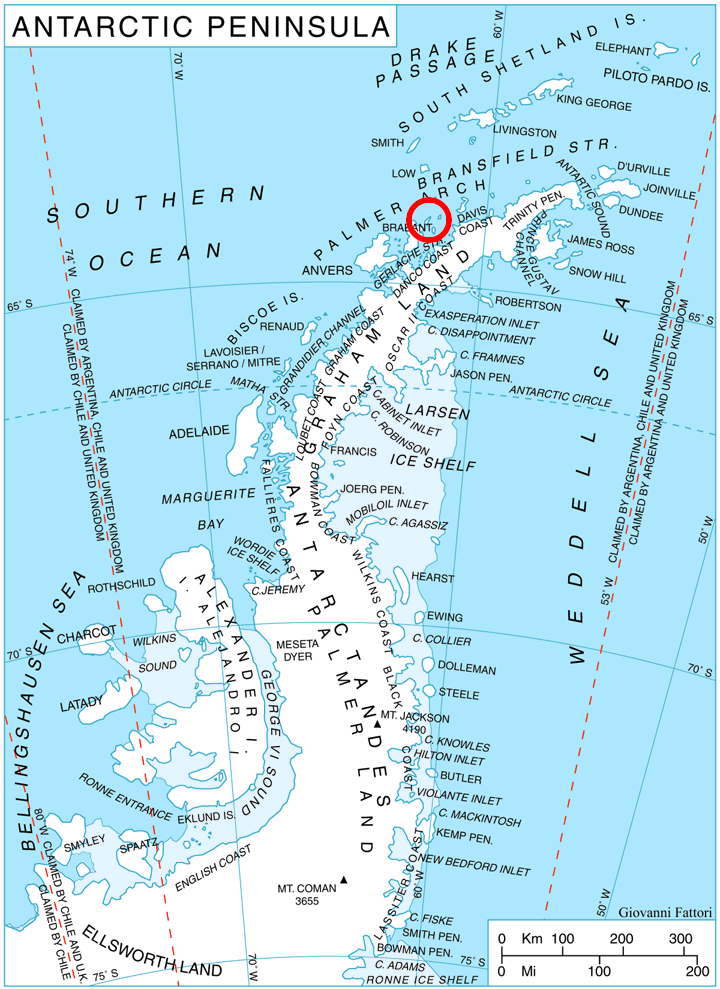
Location of Liège Island in the Antarctic Peninsula region.

Mishev Bluff (Bulgarian: Мишев рид, romanized: Mishev rid, IPA: [ˈmiʃɛv ˈrid]) is the mostly ice-covered bluff rising to 600 m in Brugmann Mountains on Liège Island in the Palmer Archipelago, Antarctica. It has precipitous and partly ice-free southwest slopes, and surmounts Zbelsurd Glacier to the north and Pleystor Glacier to the south.

The feature is named after Emil Mishev, geologist at St. Kliment Ohridski base in 2004/05 and subsequent seasons, and base commander during part of the 2006/07 season.

== Location ==
Mishev Bluff is located at 64°02′33″S 62°00′04″W, which is 1.42 km west of Pavlov Peak, 2.34 km east by north of Polezhan Point and 1.93 km east-southeast of Disilitsa Point. British mapping in 1980.

== Maps ==
- British Antarctic Territory. Scale 1:200000 topographic map. DOS 610 Series, Sheet W 64 62. Directorate of Overseas Surveys, UK, 1980.
- Antarctic Digital Database (ADD). Scale 1:250000 topographic map of Antarctica. Scientific Committee on Antarctic Research (SCAR). Since 1993, regularly upgraded and updated.
