= Sigmen Glacier =

Glacier in Antarctica

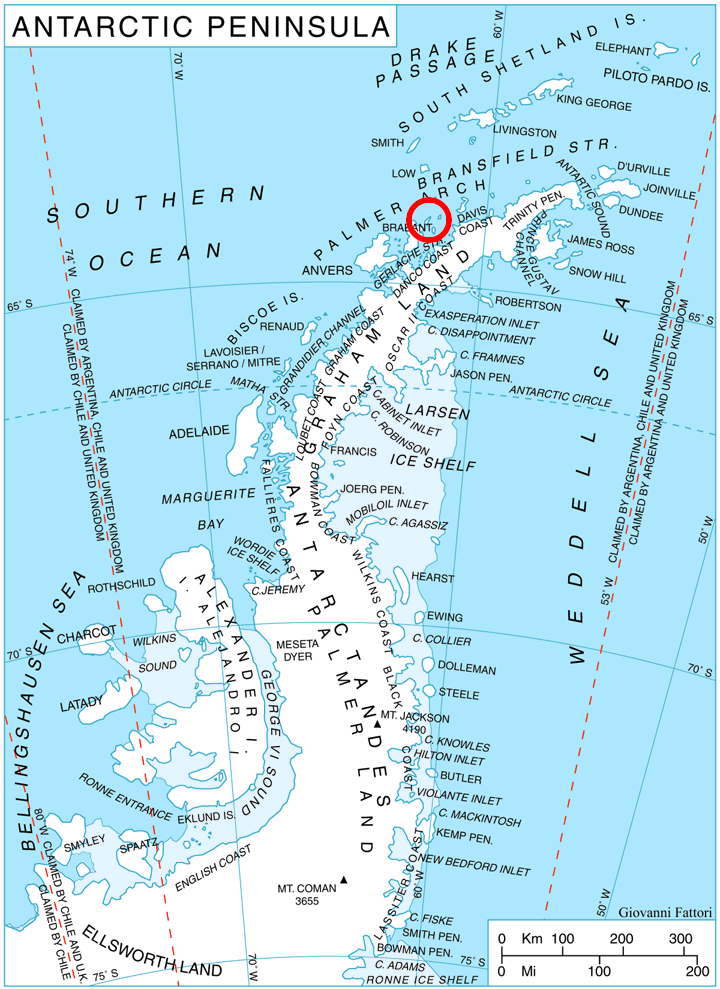
- Location of Liège Island in the Antarctic Peninsula region

- Location within Antarctica
- Location: Palmer Archipelago
- Coordinates: 64°01′S 61°56′W
- Length: 1.2 nmi (2 km; 1 mi)
- Width: 1 nmi (2 km; 1 mi)
- Thickness: unknown
- Terminus: Palakariya Cove
- Status: unknown

Sigmen Glacier (Bulgarian: ледник Сигмен, romanized: lednik Sigmen, IPA: [ˈlɛdnik ˈsiɡmɛn]) is a 2.2 km long and 2 km wide glacier draining the northwest slopes of Brugmann Mountains on Liège Island in the Palmer Archipelago, Antarctica. It is situated northeast of Zbelsurd Glacier and southwest of Shterna Glacier, draining the west-southwest slopes of Vazharov Peak and the northwest slopes of Mount Kozyak, and flows northwestwards to enter Palakariya Cove.

The glacier is named after the settlement of Sigmen in southeastern Bulgaria.

== Location ==
Sigmen Glacier is centred at 64°01′00″S 61°56′00″W. British mapping in 1978.

== See also ==
- List of glaciers in the Antarctic
- Glaciology

== Maps ==
- British Antarctic Territory. Scale 1:200000 topographic map. DOS 610 Series, Sheet W 64 60. Directorate of Overseas Surveys, UK, 1978.
- Antarctic Digital Database (ADD). Scale 1:250000 topographic map of Antarctica. Scientific Committee on Antarctic Research (SCAR), 1993–2016.
