= Balkanov Peak =

Mountain in Antarctica

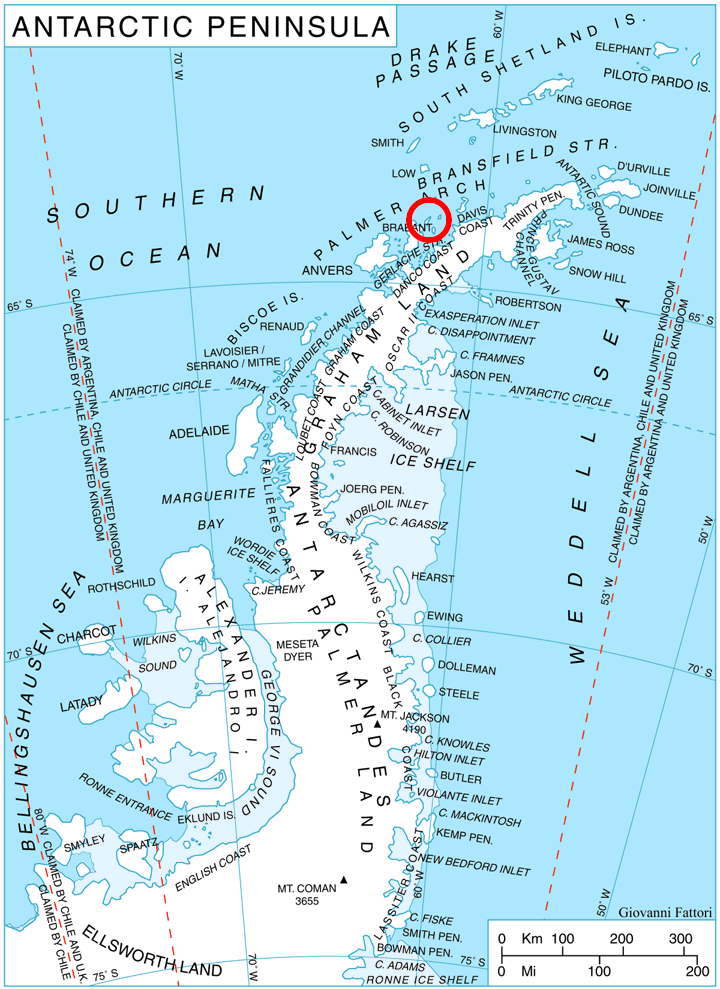
Location of Liège Island in the Antarctic Peninsula region.

Balkanov Peak (Bulgarian: Балканов връх, romanized: Balkanov vrah, IPA: [bɐɫˈkanov ˈvrɤx]) is the ice-covered twin peak rising to 646 and 648 m in Brugmann Mountains on Liège Island in the Palmer Archipelago, Antarctica. It surmounts Coria Cove to the south and Shterna Glacier to the north.

The feature is named after Ivan Balkanov, boatman at St. Kliment Ohridski base in 2002/03 and subsequent seasons.

== Location ==
Balkanov Peak is located at 64°00′24″S 61°52′11″W, which is 2.14 km east by north of Vazharov Peak and 5.8 km southwest of Neyt Point. British mapping in 1978.

== Maps ==
- British Antarctic Territory. Scale 1:200000 topographic map. DOS 610 Series, Sheet W 64 60. Directorate of Overseas Surveys, UK, 1978.
- Antarctic Digital Database (ADD). Scale 1:250000 topographic map of Antarctica. Scientific Committee on Antarctic Research (SCAR). Since 1993, regularly upgraded and updated.
