= Vazharov Peak =

Geographic Feature

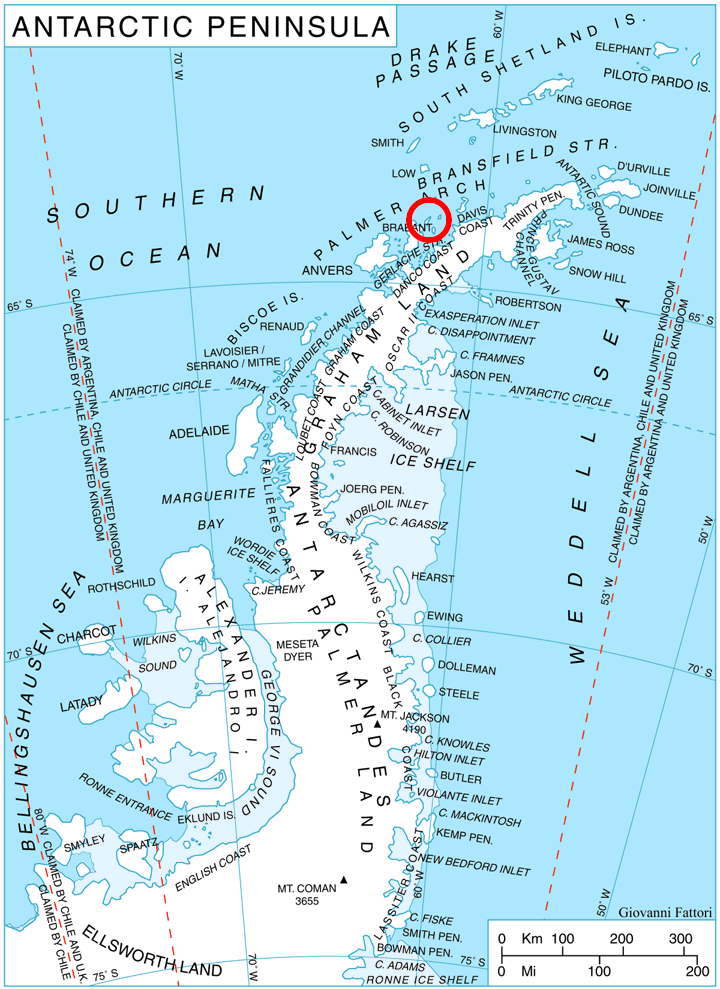
Location of Liège Island in the Antarctic Peninsula region.

Vazharov Peak (Bulgarian: Въжаров връх, romanized: Vazharov vrah, IPA: [vɐˈʒarov ˈvrɤx]) is the ice-covered peak rising to 780 m in Brugmann Mountains on Liège Island in the Palmer Archipelago, Antarctica. It surmounts Shterna Glacier to the north, Coria Cove to the east-southeast and Sigmen Glacier to the west-southwest.

The feature is named after Mihail Vazharov, a mechanic at St. Kliment Ohridski base in 1999/2000 and subsequent seasons, and base commander during part of the 2005/06 season.

== Location ==
Vazharov Peak is located at 64°00′35″S 61°54′44″W, which is 2.14 km west by south of Balkanov Peak, 1.67 km north of Mount Kozyak and 3 km southeast of Bebresh Point. British mapping in 1978.

== Maps ==
- British Antarctic Territory. Scale 1:200000 topographic map. DOS 610 Series, Sheet W 64 60. Directorate of Overseas Surveys, UK, 1978.
- Antarctic Digital Database (ADD). Scale 1:250000 topographic map of Antarctica. Scientific Committee on Antarctic Research (SCAR). Since 1993, regularly upgraded and updated.
