= Raklitsa Island =

Antarctic island

- Location within Antarctic Peninsula

Geography
- Location: Antarctica
- Coordinates: 63°58′43″S 61°51′16″W
- Archipelago: Palmer Archipelago
- Length: .35 km (0.217 mi)
- Width: .12 km (0.075 mi)

Administration
- Administered under the Antarctic Treaty System

Demographics
- Population: 0

Raklitsa Island (Bulgarian: остров Раклица, romanized: ostrov Raklitsa, IPA: [ˈɔstrof ˈraklit͡sɐ]) is the rocky island in Boisguehenneuc Bay lying 650 m off the northwest coast of Liège Island in the Palmer Archipelago, Antarctica. The island is 350 m long in east-west direction and 120 m wide.

The island is named after the settlement of Raklitsa in Southeastern Bulgaria.

== Location ==
Raklitsa Island is located at 63°58′43″S 61°51′16″W, 2.7 km southwest of Moureaux Point and 5.38 km east-northeast of Bebresh Point. British mapping in 1978.

== Maps ==
- British Antarctic Territory. Scale 1:200000 topographic map. DOS 610 Series, Sheet W 63 60. Directorate of Overseas Surveys, UK, 1978.
- Antarctic Digital Database (ADD). Scale 1:250000 topographic map of Antarctica. Scientific Committee on Antarctic Research (SCAR). Since 1993, regularly upgraded and updated.
