= Boisguehenneuc Bay =

Bay of Graham Land, Antarctica

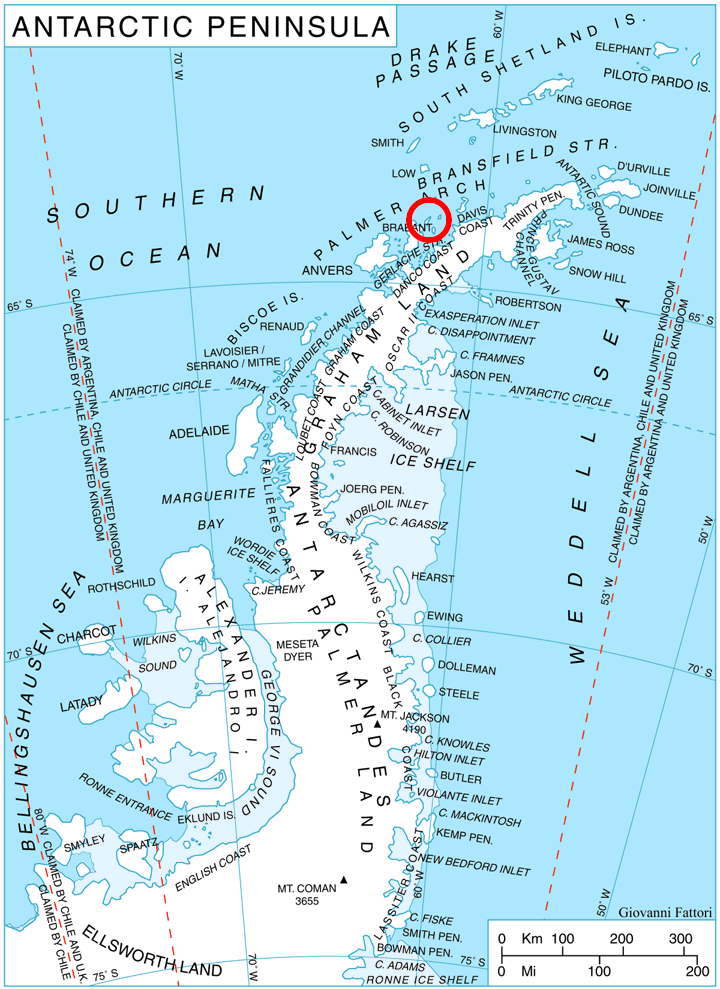
Location of Liège Island in the Antarctic Peninsula region.

Boisguehenneuc Bay (Bulgarian: залив Боагееньок, ‘Zaliv Boisguehenneuc’ \'za-liv bo-a-ge-e-'nyok\) is the 6.9 km wide bay indenting for 2.4 km the northwest coast of Liège Island in the Palmer Archipelago, Antarctica. It is entered northeast of Bebresh Point and southwest of the west extremity of Kran Peninsula, with its head fed by Shterna Glacier. Raklitsa Island is lying in the central part of the bay.

The bay is named after Lieutenant Charles Marc du Boisguehenneuc (1740-1778), a member of the French expedition of Kerguelen-Trémarec who made the first recorded landing south of the Antarctic Convergence, on Kerguelen Island on 14 February 1772.

== Location ==
Boisguehenneuc Bay is centred at 63°58′40″S 61°51′40″W. British mapping in 1978.

== Maps ==
- British Antarctic Territory. Scale 1:200000 topographic map. DOS 610 Series, Sheet W 63 60. Directorate of Overseas Surveys, UK, 1978.
- Antarctic Digital Database (ADD). Scale 1:250000 topographic map of Antarctica. Scientific Committee on Antarctic Research (SCAR). Since 1993, regularly upgraded and updated.
