= Balija Point =

Headland in the Palmer Archipelago, Antarctica

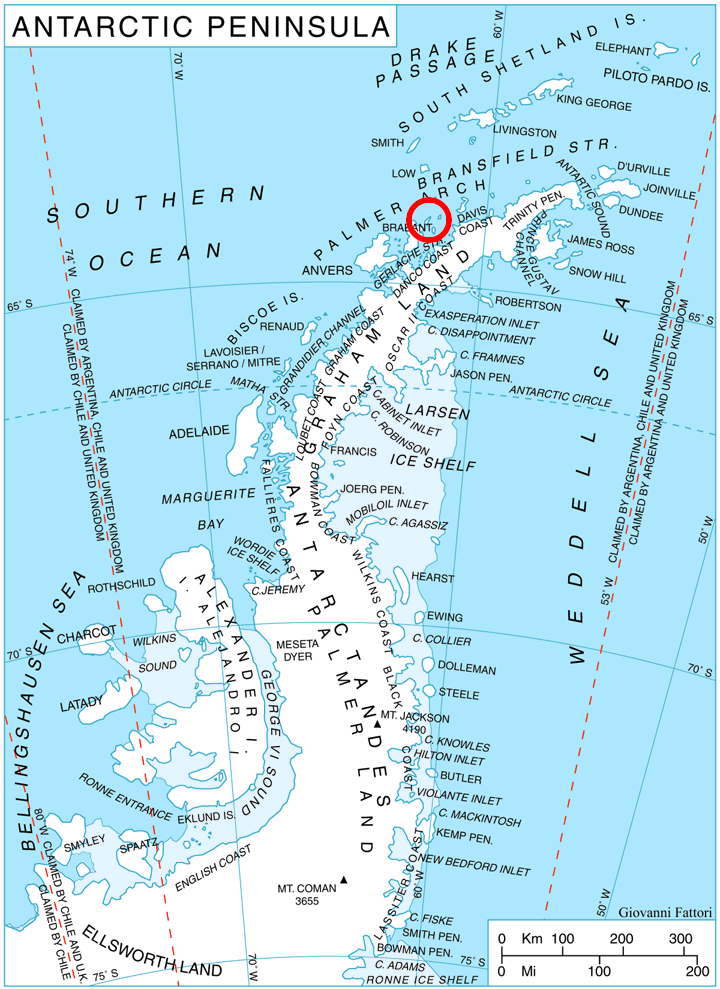
Location of Liège Island in the Antarctic Peninsula region.

Balija Point is the point on the south side of the entrance to Beripara Cove on the southeast coast of Liège Island in the Palmer Archipelago, Antarctica. It is located at 64°03′21.4″S 61°54′18″W, which is 4.75 km northeast of Macleod Point and 2.45 km south-southwest of Leshko Point. British mapping in 1978.

== Maps ==
- British Antarctic Territory. Scale 1:200000 topographic map. DOS 610 Series, Sheet W 64 60. Directorate of Overseas Surveys, UK, 1978.
- Antarctic Digital Database (ADD). Scale 1:250000 topographic map of Antarctica. Scientific Committee on Antarctic Research (SCAR). Since 1993, regularly upgraded and updated.
