= Pleystor Glacier =

Glacier in Palmer Archipelago, Antarctica

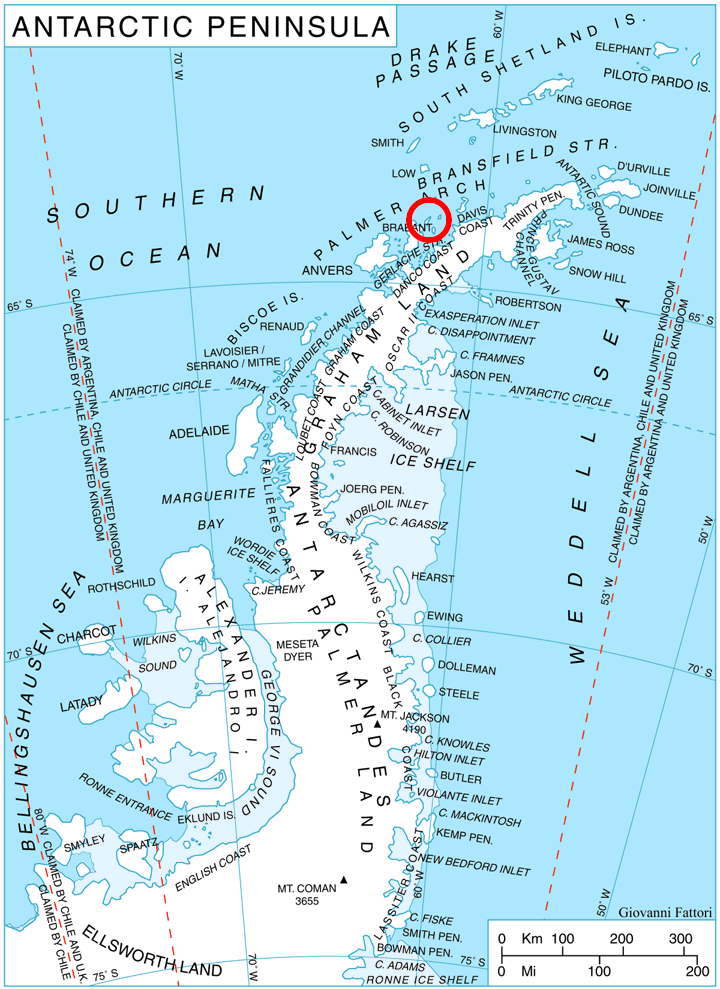
- Location of Liège Island in the Antarctic Peninsula region

- Location within Antarctica
- Location: Palmer Archipelago
- Coordinates: 64°03′18″S 62°00′35″W
- Length: 1 nmi (2 km; 1 mi)
- Width: 0.6 nmi (1 km; 1 mi)
- Thickness: unknown
- Terminus: Vapa Cove
- Status: unknown

Pleystor Glacier (Bulgarian: ледник Плейстор, romanized: lednik Pleystor, IPA: [ˈlɛdnik ˈplɛjstor]) is the 2.2 km long and 1.2 km wide glacier on the west side of Brugmann Mountains on Liège Island in the Palmer Archipelago, Antarctica. It is situated south-southwest of Zbelsurd Glacier, draining the south slopes of Mishev Bluff, the southwest slopes of Pavlov Peak and the northwest slopes of Mount Vesalius, and flowing west-northwestwards into Vapa Cove.

The glacier is named after the Thracian god Pleystor.

== Location ==
Pleystor Glacier is centred at 64°03′18″S 62°00′35″W. British mapping in 1978 and 1980.

== See also ==
- List of glaciers in the Antarctic
- Glaciology

== Maps ==
- British Antarctic Territory. Scale 1:200000 topographic map. DOS 610 Series, Sheet W 64 60. Directorate of Overseas Surveys, UK, 1978.
- British Antarctic Territory. Scale 1:200000 topographic map. DOS 610 Series, Sheet W 64 62. Directorate of Overseas Surveys, UK, 1980.
- Antarctic Digital Database (ADD). Scale 1:250000 topographic map of Antarctica. Scientific Committee on Antarctic Research (SCAR). Since 1993, regularly upgraded and updated.
