= Zbelsurd Glacier =

Glacier in Antarctica

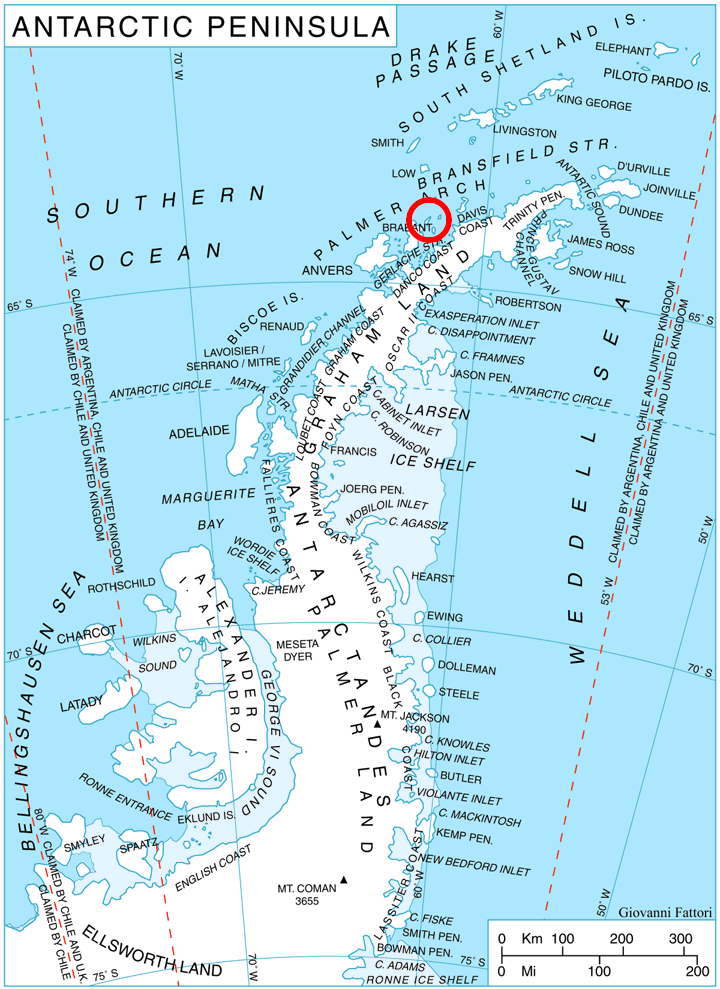
- Location of Liège Island in the Antarctic Peninsula region

- Location within Antarctica
- Location: Palmer Archipelago
- Coordinates: 64°01′55″S 61°59′30″W
- Length: 1.2 nmi (2 km; 1 mi)
- Width: 0.8 nmi (1 km; 1 mi)
- Thickness: unknown
- Terminus: Bolbabria Cove
- Status: unknown

Zbelsurd Glacier (Bulgarian: ледник Збелсурд, romanized: lednik Zbelsurd, IPA: [ˈlɛdniɡ ˈzbɛɫsort]) is the 2.25 km long and 1.6 km wide glacier on the west side of Brugmann Mountains on Liège Island in the Palmer Archipelago, Antarctica. It is situated southwest of Sigmen Glacier and north-northeast of Pleystor Glacier, draining the northwest slopes of Pavlov Peak and the north slopes of Mishev Bluff, and flowing northwestwards into Bolbabria Cove.

The glacier is named after the Thracian god Zbelsurd.

== Location ==
Zbelsurd Glacier is centred at 64°01′55″S 61°59′30″W. British mapping in 1978 and 1980.

== See also ==
- List of glaciers in the Antarctic
- Glaciology

== Maps ==
- British Antarctic Territory. Scale 1:200000 topographic map. DOS 610 Series, Sheet W 64 60. Directorate of Overseas Surveys, UK, 1978.
- British Antarctic Territory. Scale 1:200000 topographic map. DOS 610 Series, Sheet W 64 62. Directorate of Overseas Surveys, UK, 1980.
- Antarctic Digital Database (ADD). Scale 1:250000 topographic map of Antarctica. Scientific Committee on Antarctic Research (SCAR). Since 1993, regularly upgraded and updated.
