= Mount Allo =

Peak in the Palmer Archipelago

Coordinates: 63°58′S 61°48′W

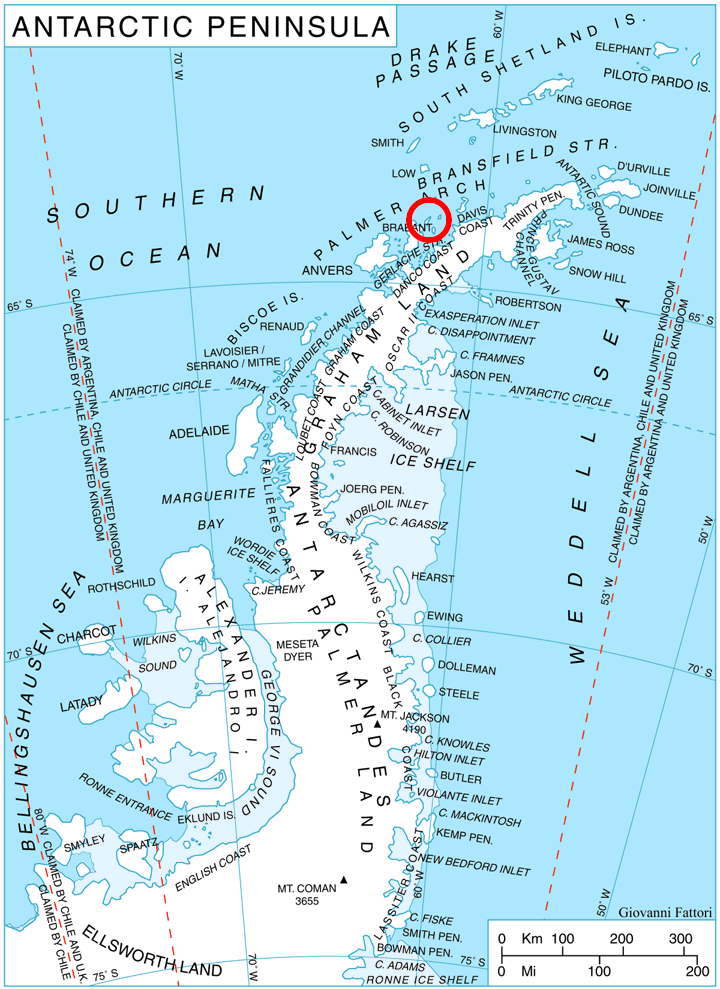
Location of Liège Island in the Antarctic Peninsula region.

Mount Allo is a conspicuous conical, snow-covered peak, 285 m in height, which rises from Neyt Point on Kran Peninsula at the northeast end of Liege Island, in the Palmer Archipelago. Discovered by the Belgian Antarctic Expedition, 1897–99, and named after M. Allo, Director General de la Marine at Anvers (Antwerp).

== See also ==
- List of Antarctic expeditions
