= Vapa Cove =

Cove in the Palmer Archipelago, Antarctica

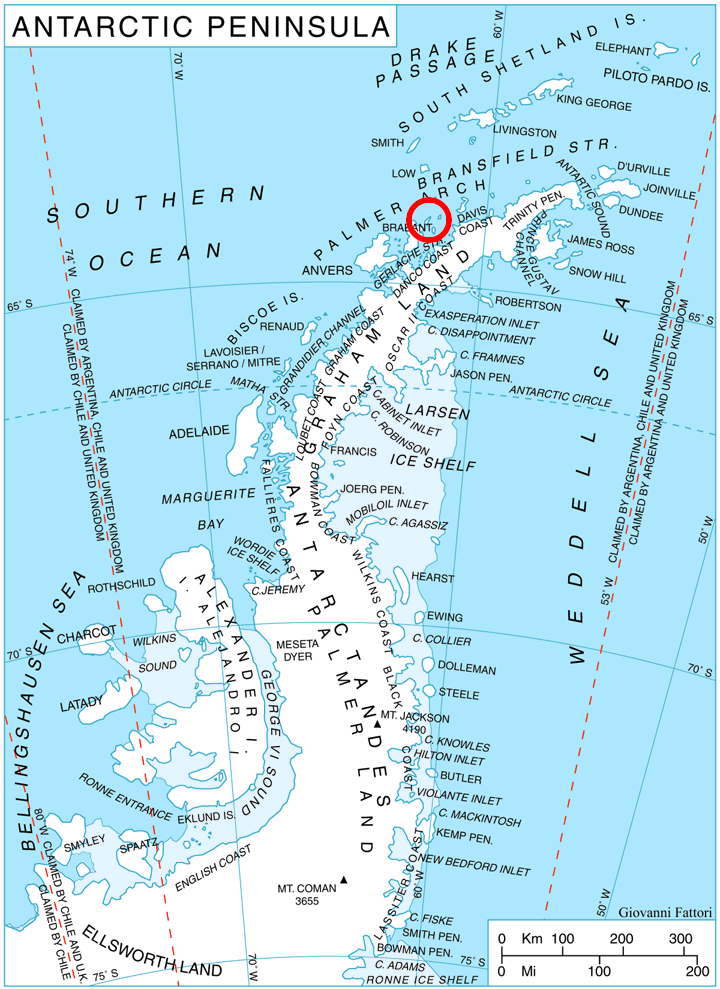
Location of Liège Island in the Antarctic Peninsula region.

Vapa Cove (Bulgarian: залив Вапа, romanized: zaliv Vapa, IPA: [ˈzaliv ˈvapɐ]) is the 1.65 km wide cove indenting for 1.1 km the west coast of Liège Island in the Palmer Archipelago, Antarctica. It is entered north of Polezhan Point and south of Disilitsa Point, and has its head fed by Pleystor Glacier.

The cove is named after Vapa Peak in Rila Mountain, Bulgaria.

== Location ==
Vapa Cove is centred at 64°02′45″S 62°02′10″W. British mapping in 1980.

== Maps ==
- British Antarctic Territory. Scale 1:200000 topographic map. DOS 610 Series, Sheet W 64 62. Directorate of Overseas Surveys, UK, 1980.
- Antarctic Digital Database (ADD). Scale 1:250000 topographic map of Antarctica. Scientific Committee on Antarctic Research (SCAR), 1993–2016.
