= Disilitsa Point =

Rocky point in the Palmer Archipelago, Antarctica

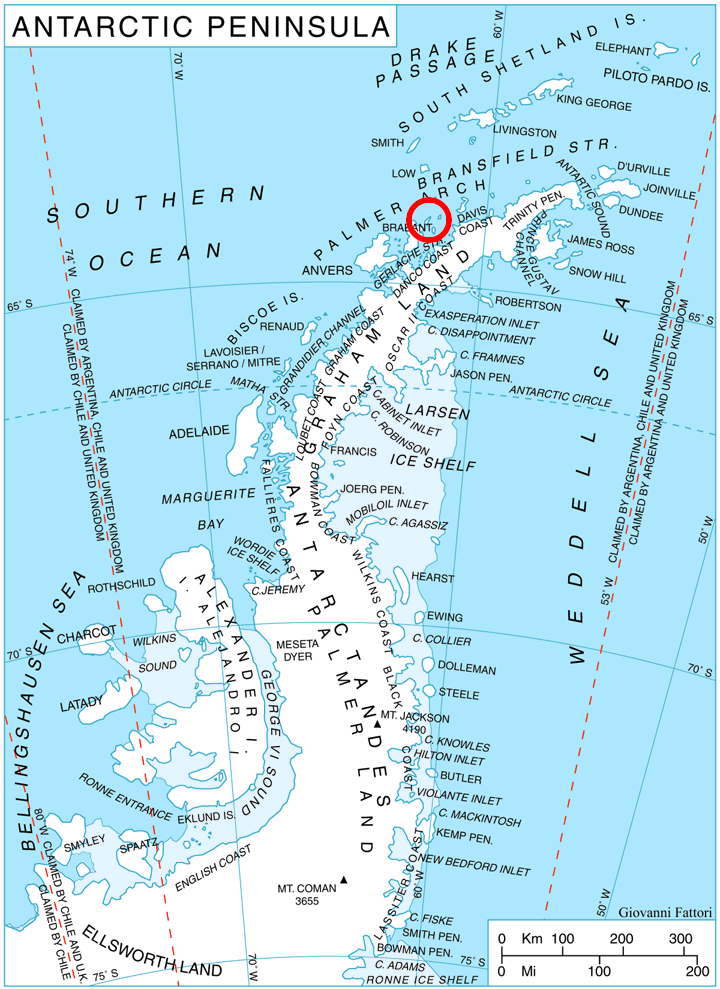
Location of Liège Island in the Antarctic Peninsula region.

Disilitsa Point (Bulgarian: нос Дисилица, ‘Nos Disilitsa’ \'nos di-'si-li-tsa\) is the rocky point on the south side of the entrance to Bolbabria Cove and the north side of the entrance to Vapa Cove on the west coast of Liège Island in the Palmer Archipelago, Antarctica.

The point is named after Disilitsa Peak in Pirin Mountain, Bulgaria.

== Location ==
Disilitsa Point is located at 64°02′02″S 62°02′06″W, which is 1.65 km north-northeast of Polezhan Point and 5.9 km southwest of Bebresh Point. British mapping in 1980.

== Maps ==
- British Antarctic Territory. Scale 1:200000 topographic map. DOS 610 Series, Sheet W 64 62. Directorate of Overseas Surveys, UK, 1980.
- Antarctic Digital Database (ADD). Scale 1:250000 topographic map of Antarctica. Scientific Committee on Antarctic Research (SCAR). Since 1993, regularly upgraded and updated.
