= Bolbabria Cove =

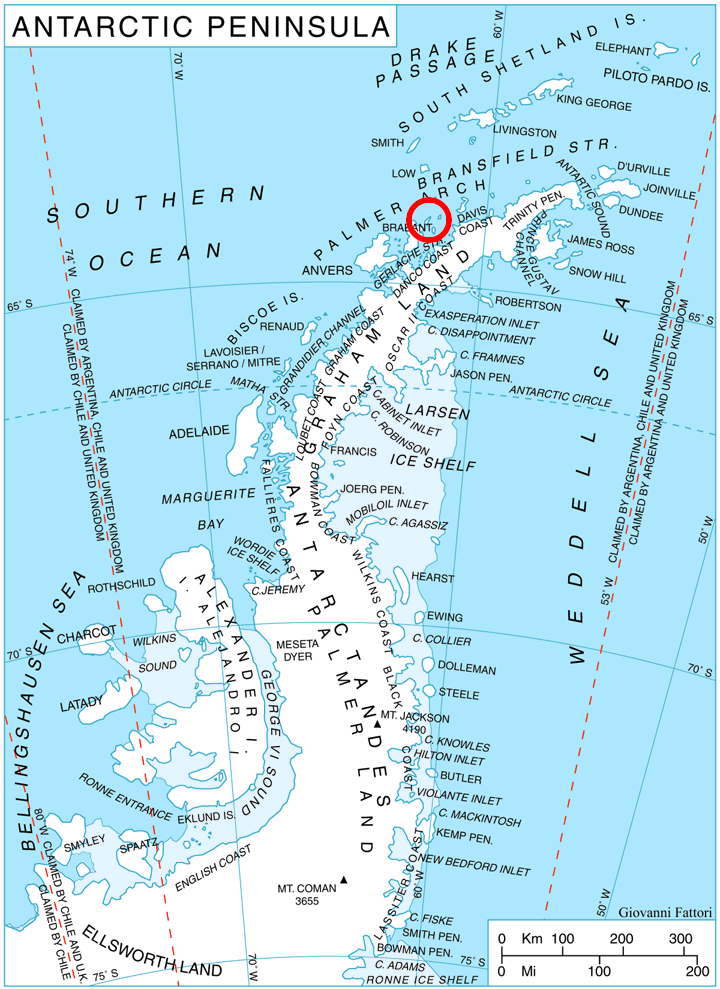
Location of Liège Island in the Antarctic Peninsula region.

Bolbabria Cove (Bulgarian: залив Болбабрия, ‘Zaliv Bolbabria’ \'za-liv bol-'ba-bri-ya\) is the 2 km wide cove indenting for 1.85 km the west coast of Liège Island in the Palmer Archipelago, Antarctica. It is entered north of Disilitsa Point and south of the westerly offshoot of Beaumont Hill, and has its head fed by Zbelsurd Glacier.

The cove is named after the ancient Thracian settlement of Bolbabria in Western Bulgaria.

== Location ==
Bolbabria Cove is located at 64°01′22″S 62°01′00″W. British mapping in 1978.

== Maps ==
- British Antarctic Territory. Scale 1:200000 topographic map. DOS 610 Series, Sheet W 64 62. Directorate of Overseas Surveys, UK, 1980.
- Antarctic Digital Database (ADD). Scale 1:250000 topographic map of Antarctica. Scientific Committee on Antarctic Research (SCAR). Since 1993, regularly upgraded and updated.
