= Leshko Point =

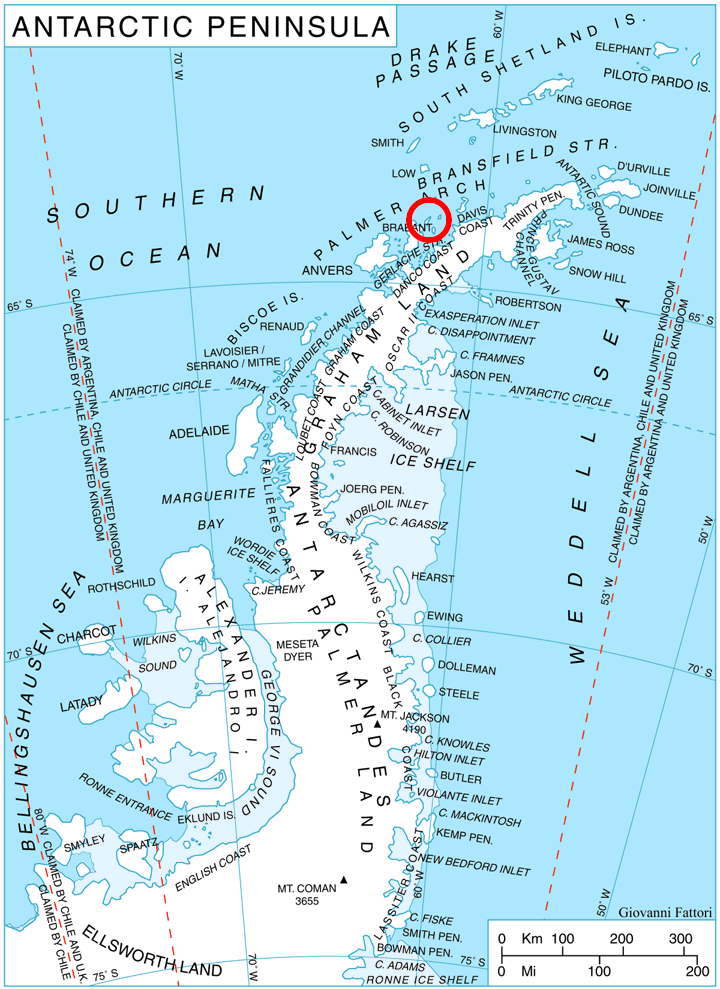
Location of Liège Island in the Antarctic Peninsula region.

Leshko Point (Bulgarian: нос Лешко, ‘Nos Leshko’ \'nos 'le-shko\) is the point on the north side of the entrance to Beripara Cove on the southeast coast of Liège Island in the Palmer Archipelago, Antarctica.

The point is named after the settlement of Leshko in Southwestern Bulgaria.

== Location ==
Leshko Point is located at 64°02′07″S 61°53′18″W, which is 8.95 km southwest of Neyt Point and 2.45 km north-northeast of Balija Point. British mapping in 1978.

== Maps ==
- British Antarctic Territory. Scale 1:200000 topographic map. DOS 610 Series, Sheet W 64 60. Directorate of Overseas Surveys, UK, 1978.
- Antarctic Digital Database (ADD). Scale 1:250000 topographic map of Antarctica. Scientific Committee on Antarctic Research (SCAR). Since 1993, regularly upgraded and updated.
