= Garbel Point =

Rocky point in the Palmer Archipelago, Antarctica

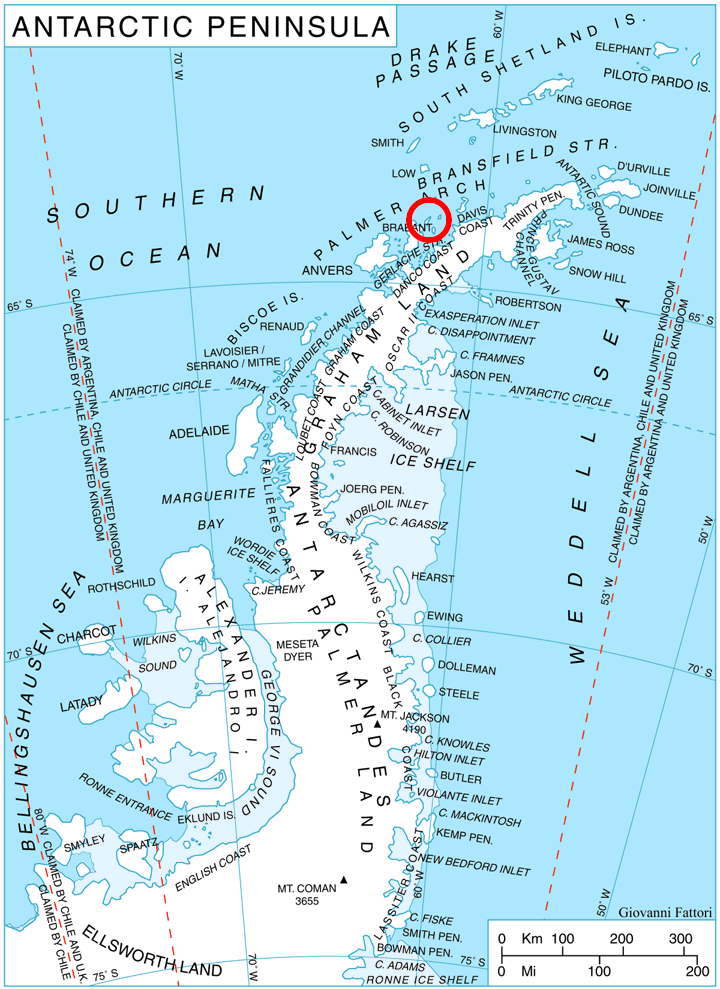
Location of Liège Island in the Antarctic Peninsula region.

Garbel Point (Bulgarian: нос Гърбел, ‘Nos Garbel’ \'nos 'g&r-bel\) is the rocky point forming the west extremity of Liège Island in the Palmer Archipelago, Antarctica.

The point is named after Garbel Peak in central Balkan Mountains, Bulgaria..

== Location ==
Garbel Point is located at 64°03′58″S 62°04′17″W, which is 2.25 km north-northwest of Chauveau Point and 2.36 km south-southwest of Polezhan Point. British mapping in 1980.

== Maps ==
- British Antarctic Territory. Scale 1:200000 topographic map. DOS 610 Series, Sheet W 64 62. Directorate of Overseas Surveys, UK, 1980.
- Antarctic Digital Database (ADD). Scale 1:250000 topographic map of Antarctica. Scientific Committee on Antarctic Research (SCAR). Since 1993, regularly upgraded and updated.
