= Sigmen =

Village of Bulgaria

Coordinates: 42°42′29″N 26°58′19″E

Sigmen (Bulgarian: Сигмен) is a village situated in the Burgas Province of Bulgaria. It is one of the 29 villages in the Karnobat Municipality located in the south-east of the country.

The village is 23.952 km² in size and has a population of 327 as of 1 January 2007.

Sigmen Glacier on Liège Island in the Palmer Archipelago, Antarctica is named after Sigmen.
