= Palakariya Cove =

Cove in the Palmer Archipelago, Antarctica

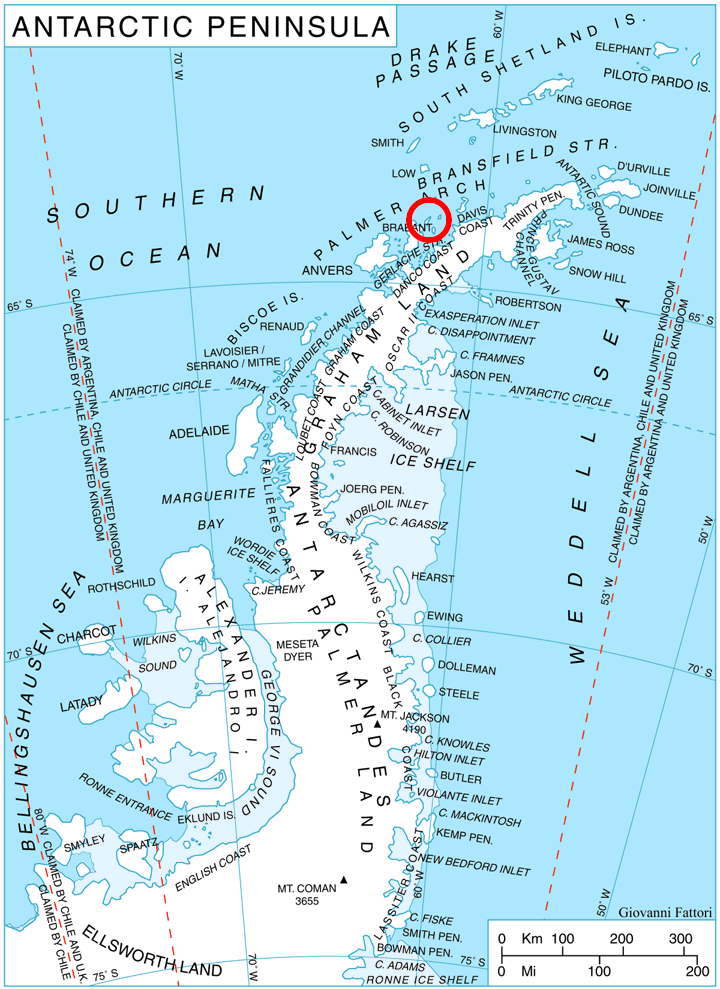
Location of Liège Island in the Antarctic Peninsula region.

Palakariya Cove (Bulgarian: залив Палакария, romanized: zaliv Palakariya, IPA: [ˈzalif pɐɫɐˈkarijɐ]) is a 3.2 km wide cove indenting for 2 km the northwest coast of Liège Island in the Palmer Archipelago, Antarctica. Entered south of Bebresh Point.

The cove is named after Palakariya River in western Bulgaria.

== Location ==
Palakariya Cove is centred at 64°00′05″S 61°58′10″W. British mapping in 1978.

== Maps ==
- British Antarctic Territory. Scale 1:200000 topographic map No. 3197. DOS 610 - W 63 60. Tolworth, UK, 1978.
- British Antarctic Territory. Scale 1:200000 topographic map No. 3198. DOS 610 - W 64 60. Tolworth, UK, 1978.
- Antarctic Digital Database (ADD). Scale 1:250000 topographic map of Antarctica. Scientific Committee on Antarctic Research (SCAR). Since 1993, regularly upgraded and updated.
