= Polezhan Point =

Rocky point in the Palmer Archipelago, Antarctica

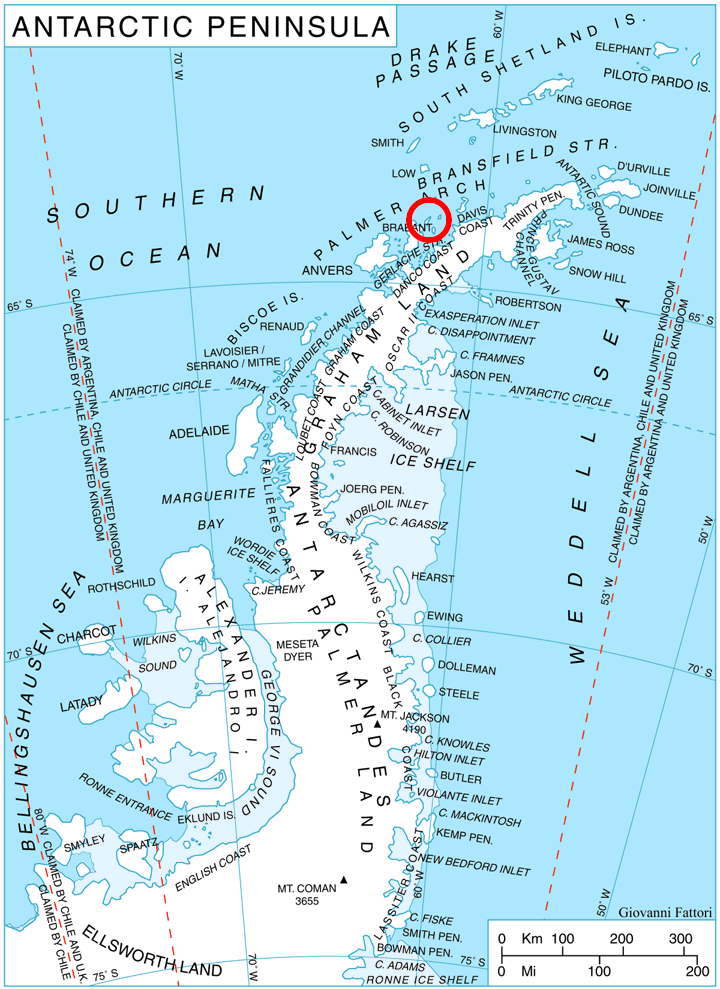
Location of Liège Island in the Antarctic Peninsula region.

Polezhan Point (Bulgarian: нос Полежан, ‘Nos Polezhan’ \'nos po-le-'zhan\) is the rocky point on the west coast of Liège Island in the Palmer Archipelago, Antarctica projecting 750 m northwestwards and forming the south side of the entrance to Vapa Cove.

The point is named after Polezhan Peak in Pirin Mountain, Bulgaria.

== Location ==
Polezhan Point is located at 64°02′52″S 62°02′50″W, which is 2.36 km north-northeast of Garbel Point and 1.65 km south-southwest of Disilitsa Point. British mapping in 1980.

== Maps ==
- British Antarctic Territory. Scale 1:200000 topographic map. DOS 610 Series, Sheet W 64 62. Directorate of Overseas Surveys, UK, 1980.
- Antarctic Digital Database (ADD). Scale 1:250000 topographic map of Antarctica. Scientific Committee on Antarctic Research (SCAR). Since 1993, regularly upgraded and updated.
