= Mount Pierre (Palmer Archipelago) =

Peak on Liège Island, Antarctica

Coordinates: 63°58′S 61°50′W

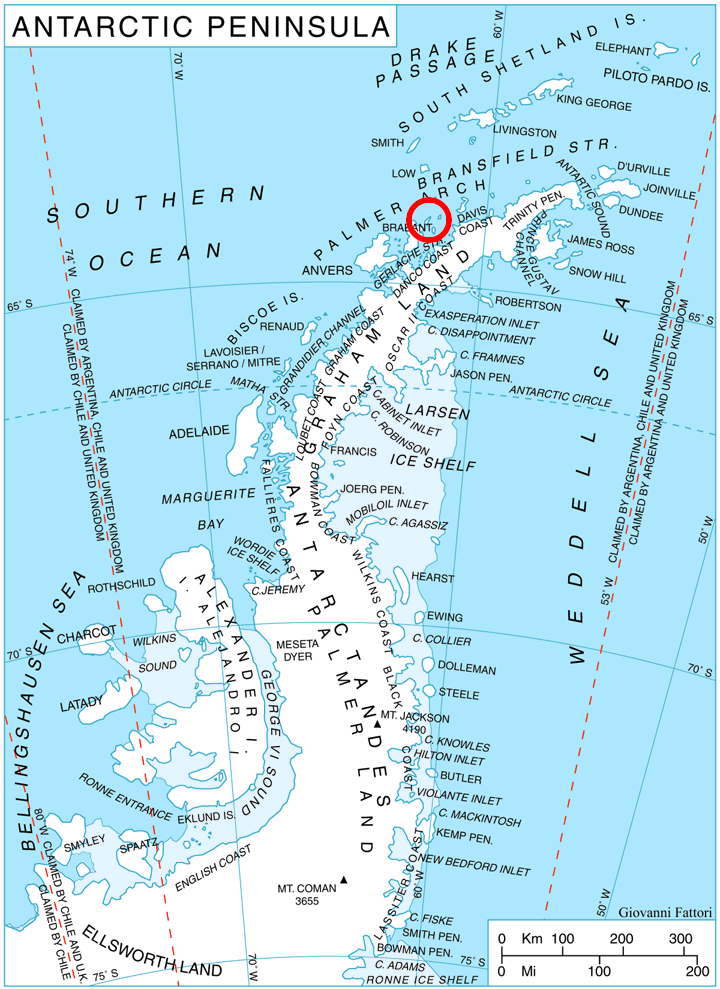
Location of Liège Island in the Antarctic Peninsula region.

Mount Pierre is a sharp conical peak, 210 m, standing immediately south of Moureaux Point on Kran Peninsula, Liège Island, in the Palmer Archipelago of Antarctica. It was discovered and named by the Belgian Antarctic Expedition under Adrien de Gerlache, 1897–99.
