= Christiania Islands =

Group of islands off Antarctica

- Location of Christiania Islands

- Location within Antarctica

Geography
- Location: Antarctica
- Coordinates: 63°57′S 61°27′W
- Archipelago: Palmer Archipelago

Administration
- Administered under the Antarctic Treaty System

The Christiania Islands (63°57′S 61°27′W) are a group of islands and rocks between Liège Island and Trinity Island, in the Palmer Archipelago, Antarctica.

== Location ==
The Christiania Islands are in the Palmer Archipelago to the west of the Antarctic Peninsula. They are south of Hoseason Island, west of Trinity Island, northwest of Cape Herschel on the Davis Coast, and northeast of Two Hummock Island and Liège Island. Intercurrence Island is the largest of the group.

- Copernx satellite image

== Mapping and name ==
The Christiania Islands were charted by the Belgian Antarctic Expedition, 1897–99, under Adrien de Gerlache, who named the group for Christiania (now Oslo), Norway, where he obtained assistance and equipment for the expedition.

== Features ==
Features include:

=== Intercurrence Island ===
63°55′S 61°24′W. An island 4.5 nautical miles (8.3 km; 5.2 mi) long, the largest of the Christiania Islands, lying 8 nautical miles (15 km; 9.2 mi) east-northeast of Liege Island. Though the origin of this name is unknown, it has appeared on maps for over a hundred years and its usage has been established internationally.

=== Franklin Point ===
63°57′S 61°29′W. Conspicuous rock point forming the west end of Intercurrence Island. First roughly charted and named Cape Franklin by Henry Foster in 1829.

=== Babel Rock ===
63°53′S 61°24′W. The northernmost of a small group of rocks lying north of Intercurrence Island, in the Palmer Archipelago. Two of the rocks lying off the north end of Intercurrence Island were first charted and named Penguin Islands by James Hoseason, First Mate of the sealer Sprightly, in 1824. Since the name has not been used in recent years, it has been rejected to avoid confusion with the many other "Penguin" names. Babel Rock, the largest and most conspicuous of the rocks, is the site of a penguin rookery and the name arises from the ceaseless noise.

=== Grinder Rock ===
63°58′S 61°26′W. The southernmost of a group of rocks extending from the southeast end of Intercurrence Island. Shown on Argentine and Chilean government charts of 1957. The name, given by the UK Antarctic Place-Names Committee (UK-APC) in 1960, is descriptive of this toothlike feature.

=== Gulch Island ===
63°59′S 61°29′W. An island lying northwest of Small Island in the Christiania Islands. Shown on an Argentine government chart of 1952. So named by the UK-APC in 1960 because the island is deeply indented.

=== Small Island ===
64°00′S 61°27′W. Island 1 nautical mile (1.9 km; 1.2 mi) long, lying 3 nautical miles (5.6 km; 3.5 mi) south of Intercurrence Island in the Christiania Islands. Though the origin of this name is unknown, it has appeared on maps for over 100 years and its usage has been established internationally.

== Sources ==
- Alberts, Fred G., ed. (1995), Geographic Names of the Antarctic (PDF) (2 ed.), United States Board on Geographic Names This article incorporates public domain material from websites or documents of the United States Board on Geographic Names.
- Graham Land and South Shetland Islands, BAS: British Antarctic Survey, 2005
