= Mount Vesalius =

Mountain on Liege Island, Palmer Archipelago, Antarctica

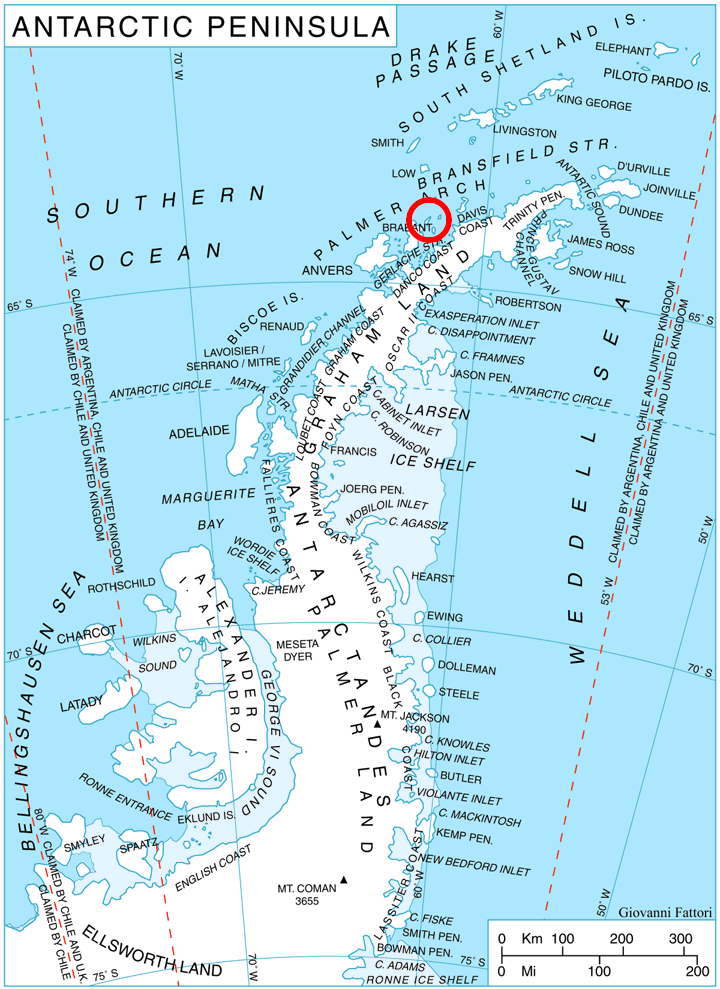
Location of Liège Island in the Antarctic Peninsula region.

Mount Vesalius (64°4′S 61°59′W) is a mountain (765 m) standing northwest of Macleod Point, Liege Island, in the Palmer Archipelago. It surmounts Pleystor Glacier to the northwest.

The peak was shown on an Argentine government chart of 1950, but was named by the United Kingdom Antarctic Place-Names Committee (UK-APC) in 1960 for Vesalius (1514–1564), a Flemish anatomist who wrote a pioneer work on the structure of the human body which revolutionized the whole concept of the subject.
