= Hoseason Island =

Island in Antarctica

- Location of Hoseason Island

- Location within Antarctic Peninsula Location within Antarctica

Geography
- Location: Palmer Archipelago, Antarctica
- Coordinates: 63°44′S 61°41′W
- Archipelago: Palmer Archipelago
- Length: 11.112 km (6.9047 mi)
- Width: 5.556 km (3.4523 mi)
- Highest elevation: 495 m (1624 ft)
- Highest point: Stopford Peak

Administration
- Administered under the Antarctic Treaty System

Hoseason Island (63°44′S 61°41′W) is an island 6 nautical miles (11 km; 6.9 mi) long and 3 nautical miles (5.6 km; 3.5 mi) wide, lying 20 nautical miles (37 km; 23 mi) west of Trinity Island in the Palmer Archipelago, Antarctica.

== Location ==
Hoseason Island is in the Palmer Archipelago to the west of the Antarctic Peninsula. It is south of Low Island, west of Trinity Island and north of the Christiania Islands and Liège Island. It is northeast of Cape Herschel, which divides the Danco Coast from the Davis Coast on the west of the Antarctic Peninsula. Features include Cape Possession in the northwest and Angot Point in the south.

== Name ==
The name of Hoseason Island, which has appeared on charts for over 100 years, commemorates James Hoseason, first mate on the Sprightly, an Enderby Brothers sealing ship which operated in these waters in 1824–25.

== Features ==
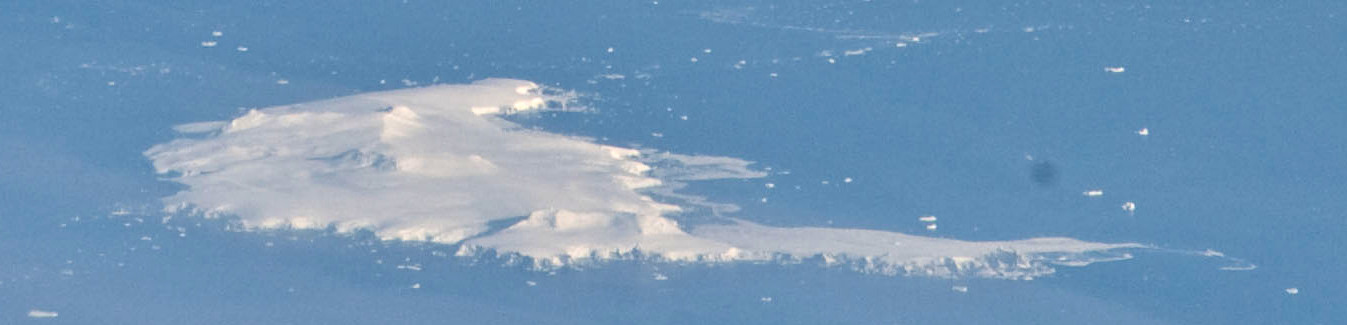
Hoseason Island (view from ISS)

Features and nearby features include:

=== Chanticleer Island ===
63°43′S 61°48′W. A nearly snow-free island, 1 nautical mile (1.9 km; 1.2 mi) long, lying off the northwest end of Hoseason Island. The island was named by the UK Antarctic Place-Names Committee (UK-APC) in 1960 after HMS Chanticleer (Captain Henry Foster), whose party made a landing in this vicinity on 7 January 1829.

=== Cape Possession ===
63°43′S 61°51′W. A cape which forms the west extremity of Chanticleer Island. The name was applied by Captain Henry Foster of the Chanticleer, whose party made a landing in this vicinity on 7 January 1829.

=== Cape Barrow ===
63°42′S 61°43′W. A steep cliff forming the north end of Hoseason Island. The cape appears in rough outline on an 1828 chart published by Richard Holmes Laurie, and was presumably observed in 1824 by James Hoseason, mate of the British sealing expedition under Edward Hughes. It was named by a British expedition under Henry Foster, 1828–1831, probably for Sir John Barrow, Secretary of the Admiralty, 1804–1806 and 1807–1845, and founder of the Royal Geographical Society. The cape was more accurately charted by the French Antarctic Expedition (FrAE), 1903-05, under Jean-Baptiste Charcot.

=== Cetacea Rocks ===
63°43′S 61°37′W. Small group of rocks off the northeast side of Hoseason Island. Charted by the French Antarctic Expedition (FrAE) under Jean-Baptiste Charcot, 1908–1910. Named by the UK-APC in 1960 after the zoological order Cetacea (whales and porpoises); these rocks lie in one of the chief Antarctic whaling areas.

=== Stopford Peak ===
63°46′S 61°38′W. A peak, 495 metres (1,624 ft) high, on the east side of Hoseason Island. First roughly charted and named "Cape Stopford" by Henry Foster in 1829 for Admiral Sir Robert Stopford (1768–1847), Commander-in-Chief at Portsmouth, 1827–1930, where Foster's ship, the Chanticleer, fitted out for the voyage. The most prominent feature on the east side of Hoseason Island is this peak which rises steeply from a straight piece of coast.

=== Angot Point ===
63°48′S 61°41′W. A point which marks the south tip of Hoseason Island. Named by the FrAE under Jean-Baptiste Charcot, 1903–1905, for Alfred Angot, Assistant Director. of the French Meteorological Service and member of the commission which published the scientific results of the expedition.

=== Croker Passage ===
64°00′S 61°42′W. A passage lying between Christiania Islands and Two Hummock Island to the east and Hoseason Island and Liège Island to the west, in the Palmer Archipelago. The northern entrance of this passage was very roughly charted and named "Croker Inlet" by Henry Foster in 1829 for John Wilson Croker (1780–1857), Secretary to the Admiralty at that time. The name has since been applied to the whole of this deep water passage, which provides an alternative entrance to the north end of Gerlache Strait.

== Sources ==
- Alberts, Fred G., ed. (1995), Geographic Names of the Antarctic (PDF) (2 ed.), United States Board on Geographic Names This article incorporates public domain material from websites or documents of the United States Board on Geographic Names.
- Graham Land and South Shetland Islands, BAS: British Antarctic Survey, 2005
