= Pavlov Peak =

Mountain in Antarctica

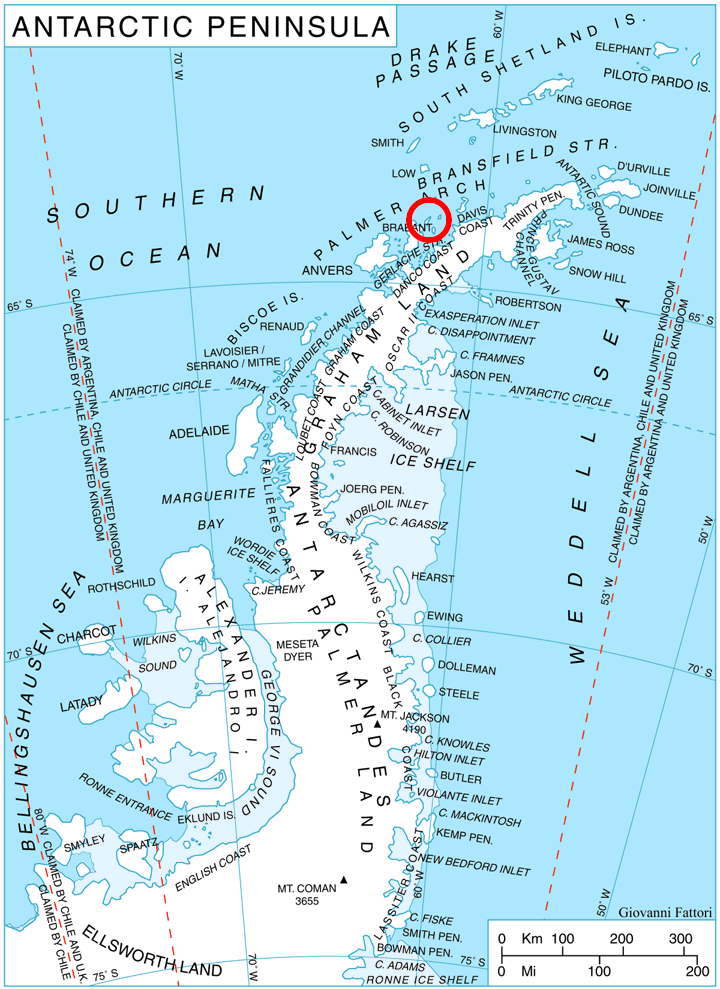
Location of Liège Island in the Antarctic Peninsula region.

Pavlov Peak (64°3′S 61°58′W) is a peak lying north of Mount Vesalius on Liege Island, in the Palmer Archipelago. It rises to 805 m and surmounts Beripara Cove to the east, Pleystor Glacier to the southwest and Zbelsurd Glacier to the northwest.

== History ==
The peak was shown on an Argentine government chart of 1954. It was named by the United Kingdom Antarctic Place-Names Committee (UK-APC) in 1960 for Ivan P. Pavlov (1849–1936), Russian experimental physiologist noted for his work on conditioned reflexes.
