= Neyt Point =

Coordinates: 63°58′S 61°48′W

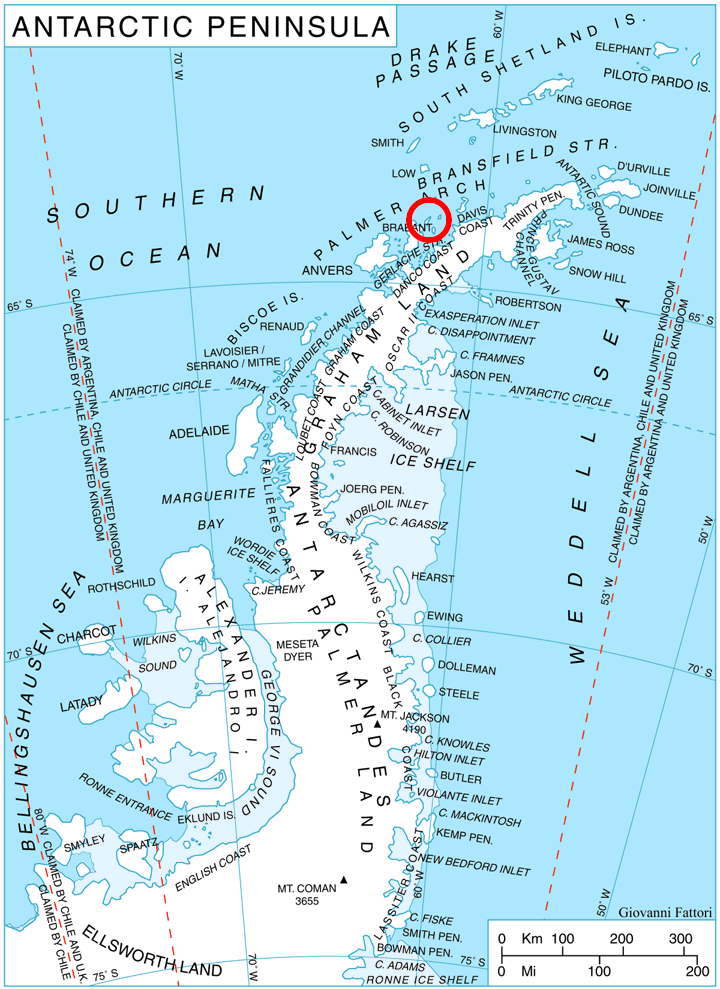
Location of Liège Island in the Antarctic Peninsula region.

Neyt Point () is a point forming the east extremity of Kran Peninsula which lies 1 nautical mile (1.9 km) southeast of Moureaux Point, the north extremity of Liege Island in the Palmer Archipelago, Antarctica. It was discovered by the Belgian Antarctic Expedition, 1897–99, under Gerlache, and named by him for General Neyt, of the Belgian Army, a supporter of the expedition. The point was photographed from the air by FIDASE, 1956–57.

== See also ==
- Mount Allo
