= Kran Peninsula =

Peninsula in Antarctica

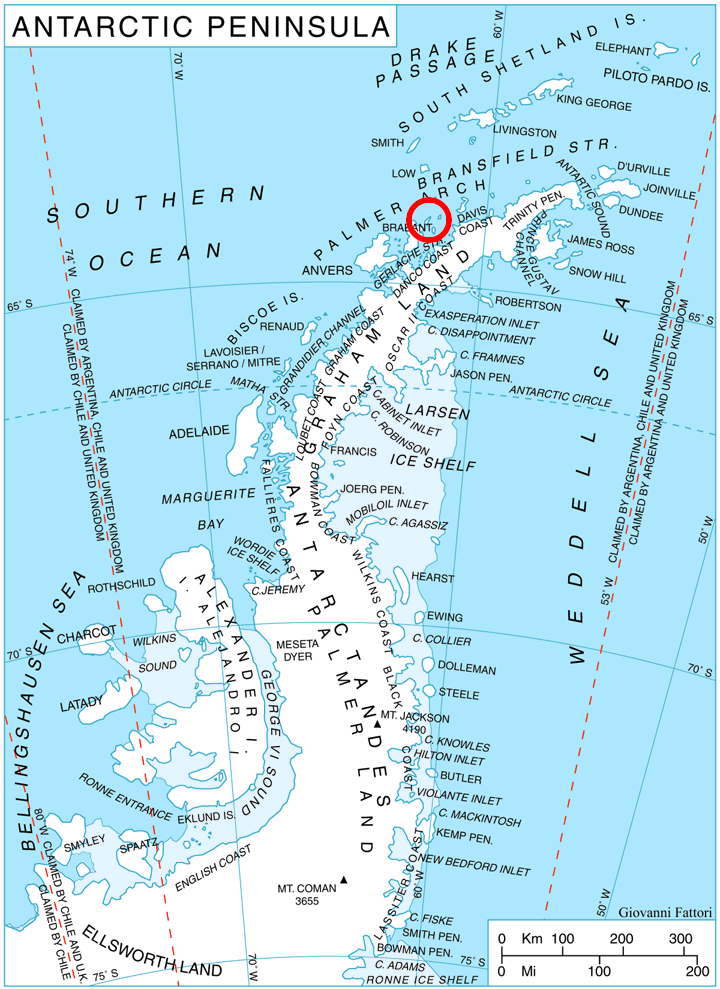
Location of Liège Island in the Antarctic Peninsula region

Kran Peninsula (Bulgarian: полуостров Крън, romanized: poluostrov Kran, IPA: [poɫuˈɔstrof ˈkrɤn]) is the heavily indented peninsula forming the northeast extremity of Liège Island in the Palmer Archipelago, Antarctica. It extends 2.85 km (1.77 mi) in north-south direction and 2.35 km (1.46 mi) in east-west direction, ending up in Moureaux Point to the north and Neyt Point to the east, and connected to the rest of the island by a 200 m (660 ft) wide neck to the south.

The feature is named after the town of Kran in Southern Bulgaria.

== Location ==
Kran Peninsula is centred at 63°58′20″S 61°49′00″W. British mapping in 1978.

== Maps ==
- British Antarctic Territory. Scale 1:200000 topographic map. DOS 610 Series, Sheet W 63 60. Directorate of Overseas Surveys, UK, 1978.
- Antarctic Digital Database (ADD). Scale 1:250000 topographic map of Antarctica. Scientific Committee on Antarctic Research (SCAR), 1993–2016.

== See also ==
- Mount Pierre (Palmer Archipelago)
