= Bebresh Point =

Point in the Palmer Archipelago, Antarctica

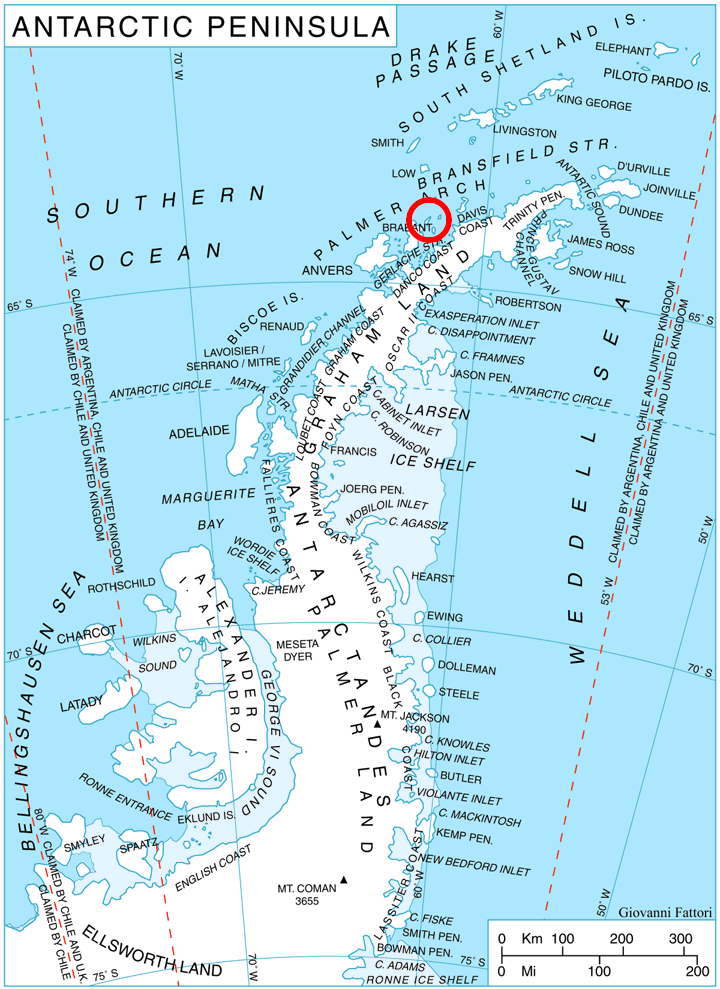
Location of Liège Island in the Antarctic Peninsula region.

Bebresh Point (Bulgarian: нос Бебреш, ‘Nos Bebresh’ \'nos 'be-bresh\) is a point projecting 1.3 km from the northwest coast of Liège Island in the Palmer Archipelago, Antarctica forming the north side of the entrance to Palakariya Cove and the west side of the entrance to Boisguehenneuc Bay. Situated 7.7 km southwest of Moureaux Point and 11.3 km north-northeast of Chauveau Point.

The point is named after the settlement of Bebresh in northern Bulgaria.

== Location ==
Bebresh Point is located at 63°59′36″S 61°57′33″W. British mapping in 1978.

== Map ==
- British Antarctic Territory. Scale 1:200000 topographic map No. 3197. DOS 610 - W 63 60. Tolworth, UK, 1978.
- Antarctic Digital Database (ADD). Scale 1:250000 topographic map of Antarctica. Scientific Committee on Antarctic Research (SCAR), 1993–2016.
