= Macleod Point =

Macleod Point (64°6′S 61°58′W) is a point forming the southeastern tip of Liège Island, in the Palmer Archipelago, Antarctica. It was shown on an Argentine government chart in 1957, but not named. The point was photographed from the air by Hunting Aerosurveys Ltd in 1956–57, and mapped from these photos by the Falkland Islands Dependencies Survey in 1959. It was named by the UK Antarctic Place-Names Committee for John Macleod, a Scottish physiologist who was one of the discoverers of insulin in 1922.
