= Coria Cove =

Cove in the Palmer Archipelago, Antarctica

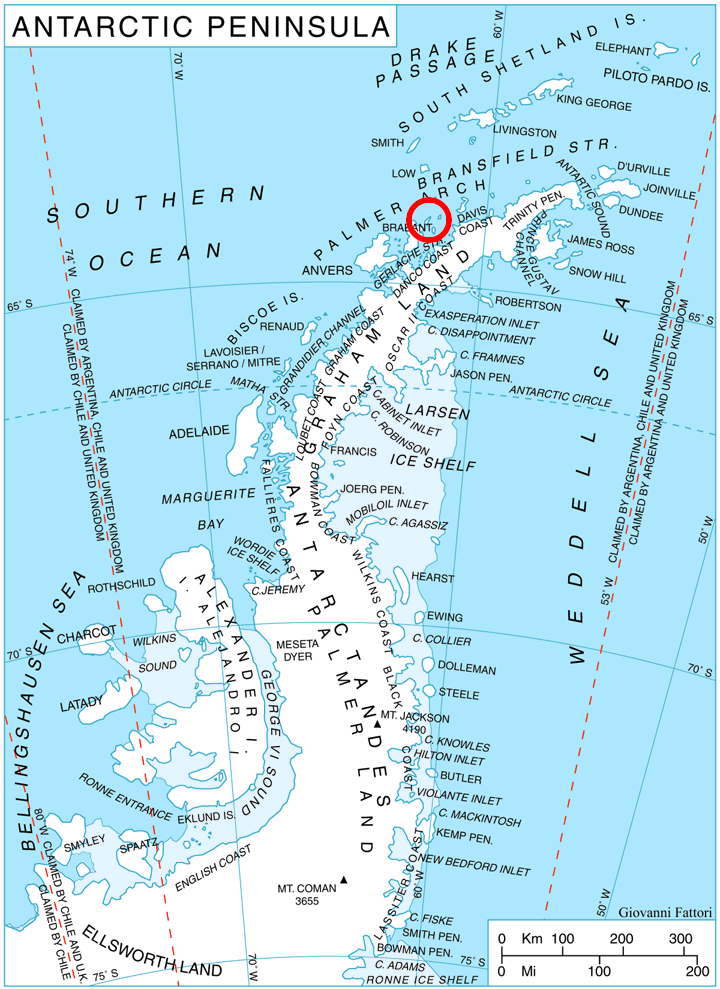
Location of Liège Island in the Antarctic Peninsula region.

Coria Cove is the 1 km wide cove indenting for 1.15 km the east coast of Liège Island in the Palmer Archipelago, Antarctica. The cove is centred at 64°01′07″S 61°52′50″W, which is 7.2 km southwest of Neyt Point. British mapping in 1978.

== Maps ==
- British Antarctic Territory. Scale 1:200000 topographic map. DOS 610 Series, Sheet W 64 60. Directorate of Overseas Surveys, UK, 1978.
- Antarctic Digital Database (ADD). Scale 1:250000 topographic map of Antarctica. Scientific Committee on Antarctic Research (SCAR). Since 1993, regularly upgraded and updated.

== Bibliography ==
- Caleta Coria. SCAR Composite Antarctic Gazetteer.
