= Brugmann Mountains =

Mountain range in Antarctica

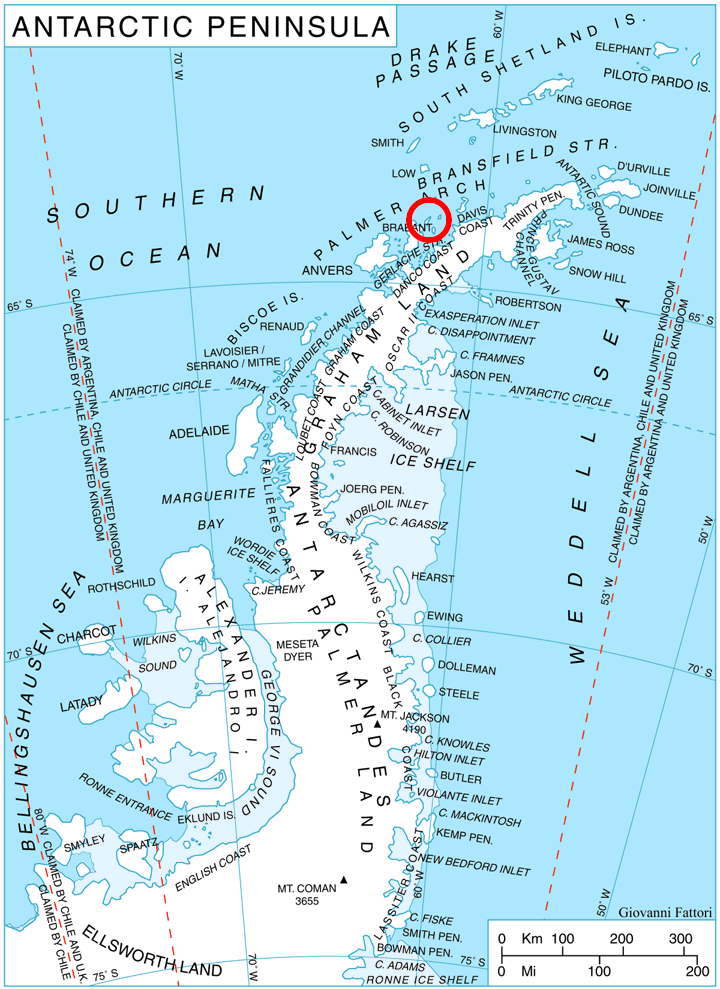
Location of Liège Island in the Antarctic Peninsula region.

The Brugmann Mountains (64°2′S 61°55′W), rising to 805 metres (2,600 ft), are steep and rugged on the east slopes but are icecapped and descend gently toward the west, extending in a northeast–southwest arc along the east side of Liège Island, in the Palmer Archipelago. Their principal peaks are Mount Vesalius, Pavlov Peak (summit of the feature), Mishev Bluff, Mount Kozyak, Vazharov Peak, and Balkanov Peak.

The mountains were discovered by the Belgian Antarctic Expedition under Gerlache, 1897–99, and named by him for Georges Brugmann, a patron of the expedition.
