= Beripara Cove =

Antarctic cove

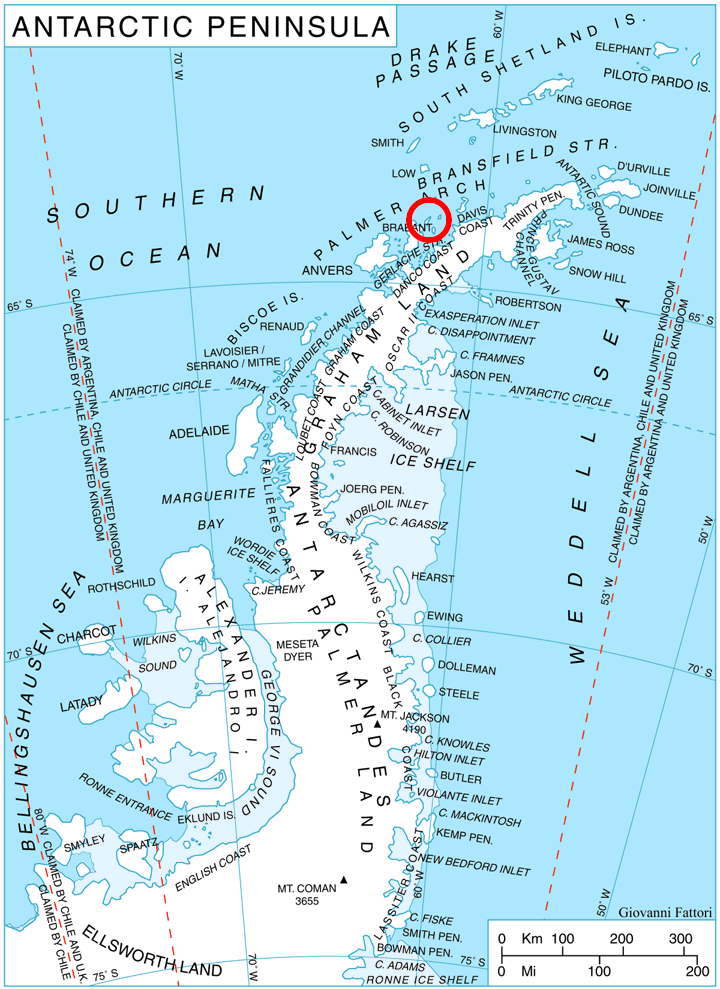
Location of Liège Island in the Antarctic Peninsula region.

Beripara Cove is the 2.45 km wide cove indenting for 1.8 km the southeast coast of Liège Island in the Palmer Archipelago, Antarctica. It is entered north of Balija Point and south of Leshko Point.

The cove is named after the ancient Thracian settlement of Beripara (Bulgarian: Берипара, romanized: Beripara, IPA: [ˈbɛriˈparɐ]) in what is now northern Bulgaria.

== Location ==
Beripara Cove is located at 64°02′40″S 61°54′50″W (as per British mapping in 1978).

== Maps ==
- British Antarctic Territory. Scale 1:200000 topographic map. DOS 610 Series, Sheet W 64 60. Directorate of Overseas Surveys, UK, 1978.
- Antarctic Digital Database (ADD). Scale 1:250000 topographic map of Antarctica. Scientific Committee on Antarctic Research (SCAR). Since 1993, regularly upgraded and updated.
