= Moureaux Point =

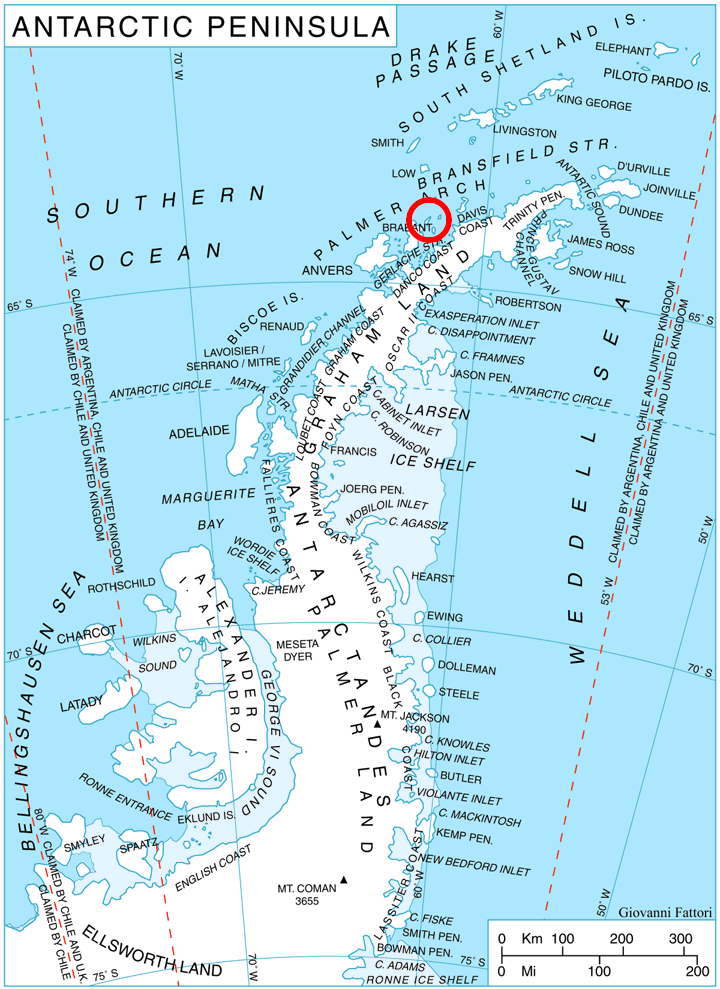
Location of Liège Island in the Antarctic Peninsula region.

Moureaux Point (63°57′S 61°49′W) is a point which forms the north extremity of Kran Peninsula and Liege Island in Palmer Archipelago, Antarctica. The feature was charted by the French Antarctic Expedition under Charcot, 1903–05, who named it for Théodule Moureaux, director of the Parc Saint-Maur Observatory, near Paris. The point was photographed from the air by FIDASE, 1956-57.

== See also ==
- Mount Pierre (Palmer Archipelago)
