= Liège Island =

Island off Antarctica

- Location of Liège Island

- Location in Antarctica Liège Island (Antarctica)

Geography
- Location: Antarctica
- Coordinates: 64°01′10″S 61°56′00″W
- Archipelago: Palmer Archipelago
- Length: 18.15 km (11.278 mi)
- Width: 7.3 km (4.54 mi)

Administration
- Administered under the Antarctic Treaty System

Demographics
- Population: Uninhabited

Liège Island (in English also Liege Island) is an island, 17 kilometres (9 nmi) long and 5.6 kilometres (3 nmi) wide, lying immediately northeast of Brabant Island in the Palmer Archipelago, and separated from Hoseason Island and Christiania Islands to the northeast by Croker Passage. Its interior is occupied by Brugmann Mountains.

Liège Island is located at 64°01′10″S 61°56′00″W. British mapping in 1978 and 1980.

The island was charted by the Belgian Antarctic Expedition (1897–1899) under Adrien de Gerlache, who named it for the province of Liège, Belgium.

== Maps ==
- British Antarctic Territory. Scale 1:200000 topographic map. DOS 610 Series, Sheet W 64 60. Directorate of Overseas Surveys, UK, 1978.
- British Antarctic Territory. Scale 1:200000 topographic map. DOS 610 Series, Sheet W 64 62. Directorate of Overseas Surveys, UK, 1980.
- Antarctic Digital Database (ADD). Scale 1:250000 topographic map of Antarctica. Scientific Committee on Antarctic Research (SCAR). Since 1993, regularly upgraded and updated.

== See also ==
- Composite Antarctic Gazetteer
- List of Antarctic and sub-Antarctic islands
- List of Antarctic islands south of 60° S
- Mount Pierre (Palmer Archipelago)
- SCAR
- Territorial claims in Antarctica
