= Pirgos Peak =

Mountain in Antarctica

Location of Oscar II Coast on Antarctic Peninsula.

Pirgos Peak (Bulgarian: връх Пиргос, romanized: vrah Pirgos, IPA: [ˈvrɤx ˈpirɡos]) is the rocky peak rising to 1092 m in Austa Ridge on Oscar II Coast in Graham Land surmounting Borima Bay to the north, and Veselie Glacier to the south. The feature is named after the ancient town of Pirgos in Southeastern Bulgaria.

== Location ==
Pirgos Peak is located at 65°14′23″S 62°07′10″W, which is 3.83 km east of Humar Peak, 4.82 km south of Furen Point, 5.63 km northwest of Caution Point, and 6.08 km north-northeast of Mount Birks. British mapping in 1976.

== Maps ==
- British Antarctic Territory. Scale 1:200000 topographic map. DOS 610 Series, Sheet W 65 62. Directorate of Overseas Surveys, Tolworth, UK, 1976.
- Antarctic Digital Database (ADD). Scale 1:250000 topographic map of Antarctica. Scientific Committee on Antarctic Research (SCAR). Since 1993, regularly upgraded and updated.
