= Svetlya Peak =

Mountain in Antarctica

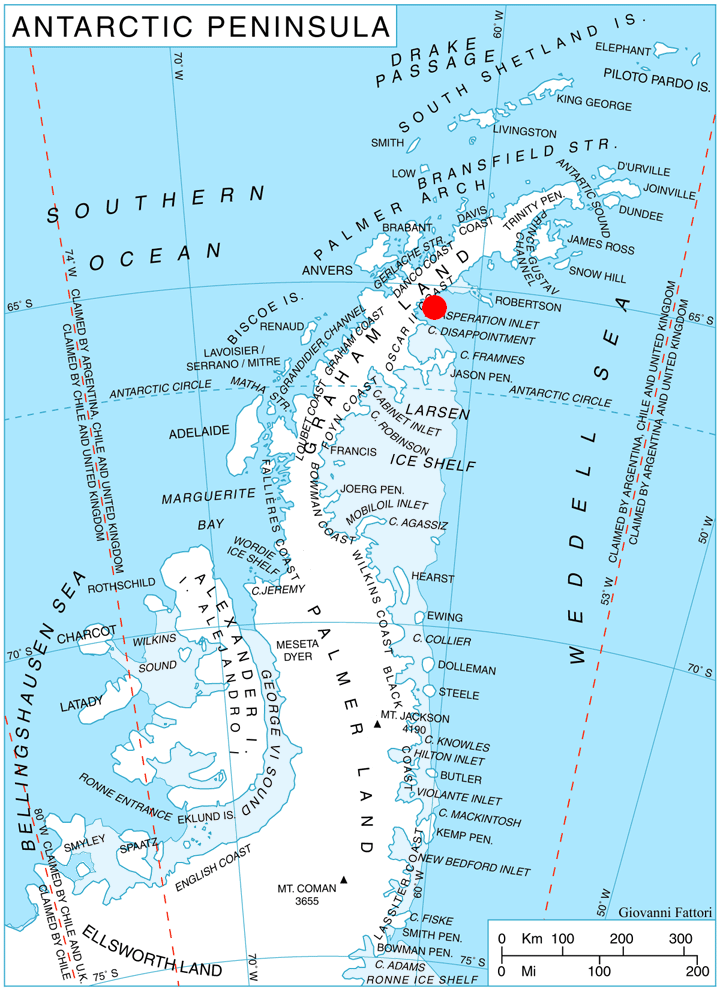
Location of Blagoevgrad Peninsula in Graham Land, Antarctic Peninsula.

Svetlya Peak (Bulgarian: връх Светля, romanized: vrah Svetlya, IPA: [ˈvrɤx ˈsvɛtʎɐ]) is a peak on the Antarctic Peninsula of Antarctica. The rocky, partly ice-free peak, rising to 716 m, is at the east extremity of Poibrene Heights on Blagoevgrad Peninsula, Oscar II Coast in Graham Land. It overlooks Vaughan Inlet to the northeast.

Svetlya Peak is named after the settlement of Svetlya in Western Bulgaria.

== Location ==
Svetlya Peak is located at 65°09′06″S 61°44′35″W, which is 2.75 km east of St. Gorazd Peak, 8.84 km west of Daskot Point, and 8.87 km northwest of Kesten Point. British mapping in 1974.

== Maps ==
- British Antarctic Territory: Graham Land. Scale 1:250000 topographic map. BAS 250 Series, Sheet SQ 19–20. London, 1974.
- Antarctic Digital Database (ADD). Scale 1:250000 topographic map of Antarctica. Scientific Committee on Antarctic Research (SCAR). Since 1993, regularly upgraded and updated.
