= Mihnevski Peak =

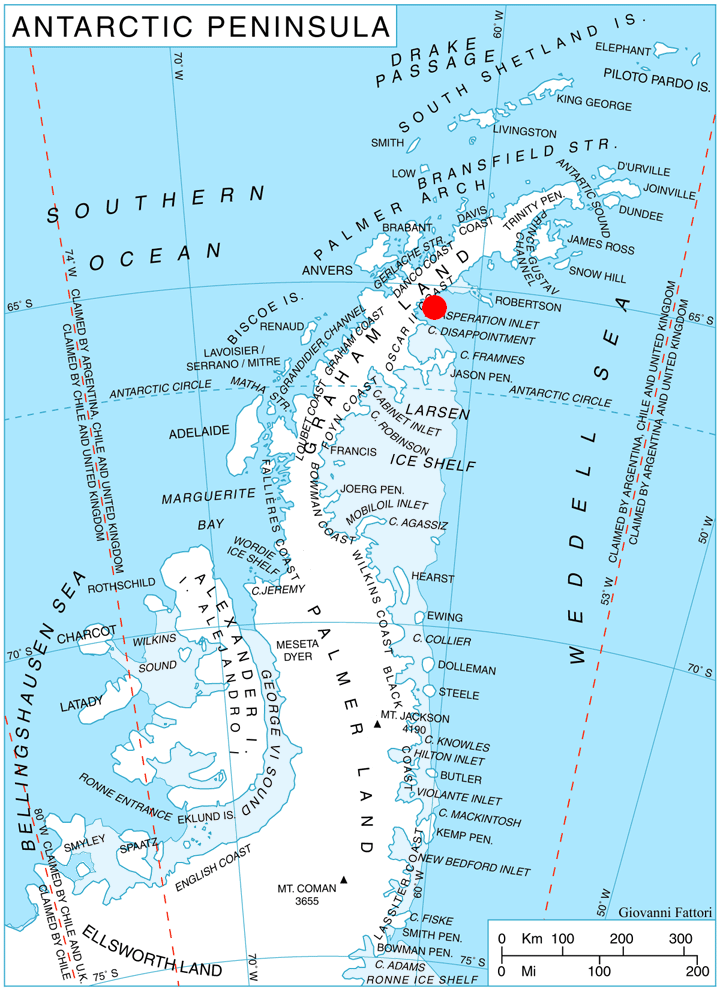
Location of Blagoevgrad Peninsula in Graham Land, Antarctic Peninsula.

Mihnevski Peak (Bulgarian: Михневски връх, romanized: Mihnevski vrah, IPA: [ˈmixnɛfski ˈvrɤx]) is the rocky, partly ice-free peak rising to 652 m in southeastern Poibrene Heights on Blagoevgrad Peninsula, Oscar II Coast, Graham Land in Antarctica. It is overlooking Exasperation Inlet to the southwest.

The feature is named after Nikolay Mihnevski, meteorologist in the first Bulgarian Antarctic campaign in 1987/88.

== Location ==
Mihnevski Peak is located at 65°11′51″S 61°52′15″W, which is 4.67 km south of Ravnogor Peak, 4.07 km west of Tikale Peak, 6.4 km northwest of Kunino Point and 5.15 km east of Diralo Point.

== Maps ==
- Antarctic Digital Database (ADD). Scale 1:250000 topographic map of Antarctica. Scientific Committee on Antarctic Research (SCAR), 1993–2016.
