= Kuzov Nunatak =

Antarctic nunatak

Location of Oscar II Coast on Antarctic Peninsula

Kuzov Nunatak (Bulgarian: Кузов нунатак, romanized: Kuzov Nunatak, IPA: [ˈkuzof ˈnunɐtak]) is the partly ice-free rocky ridge 2.6 km long in north–south direction, 550 m wide and rising to 590 m on the southwest side of Zagreus Ridge on the Oscar II Coast of the Antarctic Peninsula. It surmounts Green Glacier on the south.

The feature is named after Milan Kuzov (1953–2019), longtime TV director with the Bulgarian National Television and co-founder of the Bulgarian Antarctic Institute, for his contribution to the promotion of Antarctica and support for the Bulgarian Antarctic programme.

== Location ==
Kuzov Nunatak is located at 64°53′49″S 61°50′56″W, which is 3 km south by east of Duhla Peak, 2.8 km southwest of Govedare Peak, 11.1 km north of Pirne Peak and 9.7 km east-northeast of Dugerjav Peak.

== Maps ==
- Antarctic Digital Database (ADD). Scale 1:250000 topographic map of Antarctica. Scientific Committee on Antarctic Research (SCAR). Since 1993, regularly upgraded and updated
