= Chapanov Peak =

Mountain in Antarctica

Location of Oscar II Coast on Antarctic Peninsula.

Chapanov Peak (Bulgarian: Чапанов връх, romanized: Chapanov vrah, IPA: [t͡ʃɐˈpanov ˈvrɤx]) is the rocky, partly ice-free peak rising to 680 m in Metlichina Ridge on Oscar II Coast, Graham Land in Antarctica. It is overlooking Punchbowl Glacier to the north-northeast and Borima Bay to the south.

The feature is named after the meteorologist Tsoncho Chapanov (1930-1971), the first Bulgarian scientist to have worked in Antarctica, at the Soviet base Mirny in January–April 1967.

== Location ==
Chapanov Peak is located at 65°11′21″S 62°00′24″W, which is 1.95 km northwest of Diralo Point, 2.58 km southeast of Zahariev Peak and 5.85 km west of Kaloyanov Peak in Poibrene Heights. British mapping in 1974.

== Maps ==
- Antarctic Digital Database (ADD). Scale 1:250000 topographic map of Antarctica. Scientific Committee on Antarctic Research (SCAR). Since 1993, regularly upgraded and updated.
