= Nedev Peak =

Antarctic peak

Location of Oscar II Coast on Antarctic Peninsula

Nedev Peak (Bulgarian: Недев връх, romanized: Nedev vrah, IPA: [ˈnɛdɛf ˈvrɤx]) is the rocky peak rising to 459 m at the southeast extremity of Rugate Ridge on Oscar II Coast in Graham Land, Antarctica. It surmounts Evans Glacier on the southwest, Musina Glacier on the northwest and Vaughan Inlet on the east.

The feature is named after Konstantin Nedev, mechanic at St. Kliment Ohridski base during the 2009/10 and subsequent Bulgarian Antarctic campaigns.

== Location ==
Nedev Peak is located at 65°03′00″S 61°46′26″W, which is 6.3 km south of Pirne Peak, 18 km west of Shiver Point, 11.3 km north of St. Gorazd Peak and 9.8 km northeast of Kamenov Spur.

== Maps ==
- Antarctic Digital Database (ADD). Scale 1:250000 topographic map of Antarctica. Scientific Committee on Antarctic Research (SCAR). Since 1993, regularly upgraded and updated
