= Travnik Buttress =

Location of Oscar II Coast on Antarctic Peninsula.

Travnik Buttress (Bulgarian: рид Травник, ‘Rid Travnik’ \'rid 'trav-nik\) is the broad ice-covered buttress rising to 1609 m in the southeast foothills of Forbidden Plateau, and linked to the east to Rugate Ridge on Oscar II Coast in Graham Land. It is situated between the upper courses of Green Glacier and Evans Glacier, and has precipitous, and partly ice-free northwest, northeast and southeast slopes. The feature is named after the settlement of Travnik in Northeastern Bulgaria.

== Location ==
Travnik Buttress is located at 65°02′11″S 62°08′19″W, which is 4.5 km west-northwest of Mount Bistre, 16.95 km west-southwest of Pirne Peak, and 7.85 km northwest of Vishna Pass. British mapping in 1976.

== Maps ==
- British Antarctic Territory. Scale 1:200000 topographic map. DOS 610 Series, Sheet W 65 62. Directorate of Overseas Surveys, Tolworth, UK, 1976.
- Antarctic Digital Database (ADD). Scale 1:250000 topographic map of Antarctica. Scientific Committee on Antarctic Research (SCAR). Since 1993, regularly upgraded and updated.
