= Hitov Spur =

Narrow ridge in Antarctica

Location of Oscar II Coast on Antarctic Peninsula.

Hitov Spur (Bulgarian: Хитов рид, ‘Hitov Rid’ \'hi-tov 'rid\) is the narrow, rocky ridge descending from elevation 1700 to 500 m, and projecting from Forbidden Plateau 6.3 km east-southeastwards into Hektoria Glacier on Oscar II Coast in Graham Land. The feature is named after Panayot Hitov (1830-1918), a leader of the Bulgarian liberation movement, in connection with the settlement of Panayot Hitovo in Northeastern Bulgaria.

== Location ==
Hitov Spur is located at 64°47′57″S 61°53′23″W, which is 16.5 km northwest of Mount Quandary, 6.3 km north of Marchaevo Peak in Zagreus Ridge, 6.35 km east-northeast of Mount Walker, and 12.7 km southeast of Pishtachev Peak on Danco Coast. British mapping in 1978.

== Maps ==
- British Antarctic Territory. Scale 1:200000 topographic map. DOS 610 Series, Sheet W 64 60. Directorate of Overseas Surveys, Tolworth, UK, 1978.
- Antarctic Digital Database (ADD). Scale 1:250000 topographic map of Antarctica. Scientific Committee on Antarctic Research (SCAR). Since 1993, regularly upgraded and updated.
