= Iskra Peak =

Mountain in Antarctica

Location of Oscar II Coast on Antarctic Peninsula.

Iskra Peak (Bulgarian: връх Искра, romanized: vrah Iskra, IPA: [ˈvrɤx ˈiskrɐ]) is the partly ice-free peak rising to 1018 m in the southeast foothills of Forbidden Plateau on Oscar II Coast in Graham Land. It surmounts Paspal Glacier to the west and south, and one of its tributaries to the east. Named after the settlements of Iskra in Northern, Northeastern, Southeastern and Southern Bulgaria.

== Location ==
Iskra Peak is located at 64°52′45″S 61°56′42″W, which is 8 km south-southeast of Mount Walker, 3.8 km west-southwest of Duhla Peak, and 7 km northeast of Dugerjav Peak. British mapping in 1978.

== Maps ==
- British Antarctic Territory. Scale 1:200000 topographic map. DOS 610 Series, Sheet W 64 60. Directorate of Overseas Surveys, Tolworth, UK, 1978.
- Antarctic Digital Database (ADD). Scale 1:250000 topographic map of Antarctica. Scientific Committee on Antarctic Research (SCAR). Since 1993, regularly upgraded and updated.
