= Chakarov Peak =

Mountain in Antarctica

Location of Oscar II Coast on Antarctic Peninsula.

Chakarov Peak (Bulgarian: Чакъров връх, romanized: Chakarov Vrah, IPA: [t͡ʃɐˈkɤrov ˈvrɤx]) is the rocky, partly ice-free peak rising to 883 m in Poibrene Heights on Oscar II Coast, Graham Land in Antarctica. It is overlooking Punchbowl Glacier to the west.

The feature is named after Asen Chakarov, engineer in the first Bulgarian Antarctic campaign in 1987/88.

== Location ==
Chakarov Peak is located at 65°08′50″S 61°54′54″W, which is 2.95 km west-northwest of Ravnogor Peak, 3.94 km north-northwest of Kaloyanov Peak, 4.7 km east of Andreev Nunatak and 3.8 km south-southwest of St. Sava Peak.

== Maps ==
- Antarctic Digital Database (ADD). Scale 1:250000 topographic map of Antarctica. Scientific Committee on Antarctic Research (SCAR), 1993–2016.
