= Andreev Nunatak =

Nunatak in Graham Land, Antarctica

Location of Oscar II Coast on Antarctic Peninsula.

Andreev Nunatak (Bulgarian: Андреев нунатак, ‘Andreev Nunatak’ \an-'dre-ev 'nu-na-tak\) is the rocky ridge extending 2.8 km and rising to 654 m in Punchbowl Glacier on Oscar II Coast, Graham Land in Antarctica.

The feature is named after Valentin Andreev, physician at St. Kliment Ohridski base in 2000/01 and base commander in subsequent seasons.

== Location ==
The highest point of Andreev Nunatak is located at 65°08′36″S 62°00′53″W, which is 2.8 km east of St. Angelariy Peak in Metlichina Ridge, 5.4 km southeast of Vishna Pass, 4.7 km west of Chakarov Peak in Poibrene Heights, and 6.8 km north-northwest of Diralo Point. British mapping in 1974.

== Maps ==
- Antarctic Digital Database (ADD). Scale 1:250000 topographic map of Antarctica. Scientific Committee on Antarctic Research (SCAR). Since 1993, regularly upgraded and updated.
