= Zahariev Peak =

Mountain in Antarctica

Location of Oscar II Coast on Antarctic Peninsula.

Vasil Christian Zahariev Peak (or Zahariev Peak) (Bulgarian: Захариев връх, romanized: Zahariev vrah, IPA: [zɐˈxariɛv ˈvrɤx]) is a rocky, partly ice-free peak rising to 816 m in Metlichina Ridge on Oscar II Coast, Graham Land in Antarctica. It overlooks Punchbowl Glacier to the northeast and Borima Bay to the southwest.

The feature is named after the Bulgarian meteorologist Vasil Christian Zahariev (1929-2006) who worked at the Soviet base Mirny in 1967–69.

== Location ==
Zahariev Peak is located at 65°10′42″S 62°03′19″W, which is 3.9 km south of St. Angelariy Peak, 2.58 km northwest of Chapanov Peak and 5.45 km east-northeast of Yordanov Nunatak. British mapping in 1974.

== Maps ==
- Antarctic Digital Database (ADD). Scale 1:250000 topographic map of Antarctica. Scientific Committee on Antarctic Research (SCAR). Since 1993, regularly upgraded and updated.
