= Devetaki Peak =

Peak in Graham Land, Australia

Location of Oscar II Coast on Antarctic Peninsula.

Devetaki Peak (Bulgarian: връх Деветаки, romanized: vrah Devetaki, IPA: [ˈvrɤɣ dɛvɛˈtaki]) is the rocky peak rising to 1254 m in Austa Ridge on Oscar II Coast in Graham Land. It surmounts Chernoochene Glacier to the north and east, and Spillane Fjord to the south. The feature is named after the settlement of Devetaki in Northern Bulgaria.

== Location ==
Devetaki Peak is located at 65°17′43″S 62°18′00″W, which is 7.42 km southwest of Humar Peak, 6.23 km west of Mount Birks, and 14.57 km northeast of Ishirkov Crag in Arkovna Ridge. British mapping in 1976.

== Maps ==
- British Antarctic Territory. Scale 1:200000 topographic map. DOS 610 Series, Sheet W 65 62. Directorate of Overseas Surveys, Tolworth, UK, 1976.
- Antarctic Digital Database (ADD). Scale 1:250000 topographic map of Antarctica. Scientific Committee on Antarctic Research (SCAR). Since 1993, regularly upgraded and updated.
