= Sekirna Spur =

Peak on Antarctic Peninsula

Location of Oscar II Coast on Antarctic Peninsula.

Sekirna Spur (Bulgarian: връх Секирна, romanized: vrah Sekirna, IPA: [ˈvrɤx sɛˈkirnɐ]) is the rocky, partly ice-free peak rising to 776 m at the southeast extremity of Zagreus Ridge on Oscar II Coast in Graham Land. It surmounts Hektoria Glacier to the northeast and southeast, and Paspal Glacier and Green Glacier to the west and south. The feature is named after the settlements of Gorna (Upper) and Dolna (Lower) Sekirna in Western Bulgaria.

== Location ==
Sekirna Spur is located at 64°54′00″S 61°46′47″W, which is 3.05 km south-southeast of Govedare Peak, 10.43 km west-southwest of Mount Quandary, and 10.5 km north of Pirne Peak. British mapping in 1978.

== Maps ==
- British Antarctic Territory. Scale 1:200000 topographic map. DOS 610 Series, Sheet W 64 60. Directorate of Overseas Surveys, Tolworth, UK, 1978.
- Antarctic Digital Database (ADD). Scale 1:250000 topographic map of Antarctica. Scientific Committee on Antarctic Research (SCAR). Since 1993, regularly upgraded and updated.
