= Kaloyanov Peak =

Peak in Graham Land, Antarctica

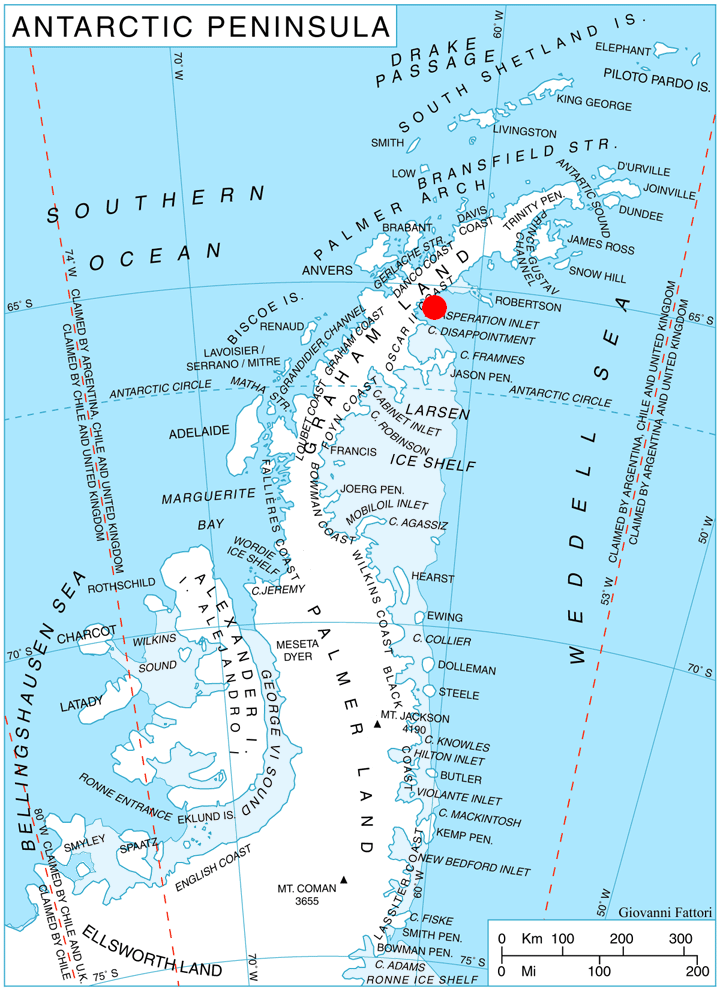
Location of Blagoevgrad Peninsula in Graham Land, Antarctic Peninsula.

Kaloyanov Peak (Bulgarian: Калоянов връх, romanized: Kaloyanov vrah, IPA: [kɐɫoˈjanov ˈvrɤx]) is the rocky, partly ice-free peak rising to 705 m in southeastern Poibrene Heights on Blagoevgrad Peninsula, Oscar II Coast, Graham Land in Antarctica. It is overlooking Exasperation Inlet to the southwest.

The feature is named after Stefan Kaloyanov, radioman in the first Bulgarian Antarctic campaign in 1987/88.

== Location ==
Kaloyanov Peak is located at 65°10′48″S 61°53′01″W, which is 2.95 km south-southwest of Ravnogor Peak, 4.38 km west of Dimcha Peak and 2.04 km north-northwest of Mihnevski Peak.

== Maps ==
- Antarctic Digital Database (ADD). Scale 1:250000 topographic map of Antarctica. Scientific Committee on Antarctic Research (SCAR). Since 1993, regularly upgraded and updated.
