= Govedare Peak =

Mountain in Antarctica

Location of Oscar II Coast on Antarctic Peninsula.

Govedare Peak (Bulgarian: връх Говедаре, romanized: vrah Govedare, IPA: [ˈvrɤɣ ɡovɛˈdarɛ]) is the rocky peak rising to 876 m in Zagreus Ridge on Oscar II Coast in Graham Land. It surmounts Hektoria Glacier to the northeast and a tributary to Paspal Glacier to the southwest. The feature is named after the settlement of Govedare in Southern Bulgaria.

== Location ==
Govedare Peak is located at 64°52′33″S 61°48′38″W, which is 2.73 km east-southeast of Duhla Peak, 11.18 km west of Mount Quandary, and 13.18 km north of Pirne Peak. British mapping in 1978.

== Maps ==
- British Antarctic Territory. Scale 1:200000 topographic map. DOS 610 Series, Sheet W 64 60. Directorate of Overseas Surveys, Tolworth, UK, 1978.
- Antarctic Digital Database (ADD). Scale 1:250000 topographic map of Antarctica. Scientific Committee on Antarctic Research (SCAR). Since 1993, regularly upgraded and updated.
