= Humar Peak =

Peak in Antarctica

Location of Oscar II Coast on Antarctic Peninsula.

Humar Peak (Bulgarian: връх Хумар, romanized: vrah Humar, IPA: [ˈvrɤx xoˈmar]) is the rocky peak rising to 1321 m in Austa Ridge on Oscar II Coast in Graham Land, and surmounting Jorum Glacier to the north, and Veselie Glacier to the south. The feature is named after the Bulgar town of Humar in Northern Caucasus in 2nd-7th century.

== Location ==
Humar Peak is located at 65°14′36″S 62°12′03″W, which is 5.9 km south-southwest of Yordanov Nunatak, 9.14 km west of Caution Point, and 5.5 km north-northwest of Mount Birks. British mapping in 1976.

== Maps ==
- British Antarctic Territory. Scale 1:200000 topographic map. DOS 610 Series, Sheet W 65 62. Directorate of Overseas Surveys, Tolworth, UK, 1976.
- Antarctic Digital Database (ADD). Scale 1:250000 topographic map of Antarctica. Scientific Committee on Antarctic Research (SCAR). Since 1993, regularly upgraded and updated.
