= Tatarchev Nunatak =

Nunatak in Graham Land, Antarctica

Location of Oscar II Coast on Antarctic Peninsula.

Tatarchev Nunatak (Bulgarian: Татарчев нунатак, ‘Tatarchev Nunatak’ \ta-'tar-chev 'nu-na-tak\) is the rocky ridge rising to 645 m (central height) and 659 m (eastern one) and horseshoe-shaped, extending 3.2 km in north-south direction and 2.2 km in east-west direction on Oscar II Coast in Graham Land. It is part of the glacial divide between Hektoria Glacier to the west and Brenitsa Glacier to the east. The feature is named after Hristo Tatarchev (1869-1952), a leader of the Bulgarian liberation movement in Macedonia.

== Location ==
Tatarchev Nunatak is located at 64°53′47″S 61°34′13″W, which is 3.65 km south of Mount Quandary, 5.75 km northwest of Reselets Peak, and 9.9 km east of Sekirna Spur. British mapping in 1978.

== Maps ==
- British Antarctic Territory. Scale 1:200000 topographic map. DOS 610 Series, Sheet W 64 60. Directorate of Overseas Surveys, Tolworth, UK, 1978.
- Antarctic Digital Database (ADD). Scale 1:250000 topographic map of Antarctica. Scientific Committee on Antarctic Research (SCAR). Since 1993, regularly upgraded and updated.
