= Vishna Pass =

Antarctic mountain pass

Location of Oscar II Coast on Antarctic Peninsula.

Vishna Pass (Bulgarian: проход Вишна, ‘Prohod Vishna’ \'pro-hod 'vi-shna\) is the ice-covered saddle of elevation 632 m separating Poibrene Heights from Forbidden Plateau on Oscar II Coast, Graham Land in Antarctica. It is part of the glacial divide between Evans Glacier to the north and Punchbowl Glacier to the south.

The feature is named after the settlement of Vishna in eastern Bulgaria.

== Location ==
Vishna Pass is located at 65°06′05″S 62°04′26″W, which is 2.8 km south of Mount Bistre, 5.7 km west of Kamenov Spur, and 4.75 km north of St. Angelariy Peak in Metlichina Ridge. British mapping in 1974.

== Maps ==
- Antarctic Digital Database (ADD). Scale 1:250000 topographic map of Antarctica. Scientific Committee on Antarctic Research (SCAR), 1993–2016.
