= Duhla Peak =

Mountain in Antarctica

Location of Oscar II Coast on Antarctic Peninsula.

Duhla Peak (Bulgarian: връх Духла, romanized: vrah Duhla, IPA: [ˈvrɤɣ ˈduxɫɐ]) is the rocky peak rising to 1010 m in Zagreus Ridge on Oscar II Coast in Graham Land. It surmounts Hektoria Glacier to the northeast, and tributaries to Paspal Glacier to the west and southeast. The feature is named after Duhla Cave in Western Bulgaria.

== Location ==
Duhla Peak is located at 64°52′15″S 61°52′01″W. 1.82 km south-southeast of Marchaevo Peak, 13.8 km west of Mount Quandary, and 10.4 km northeast of Dugerjav Peak. British mapping in 1978.

== Maps ==
- British Antarctic Territory. Scale 1:200000 topographic map. DOS 610 Series, Sheet W 64 60. Directorate of Overseas Surveys, Tolworth, UK, 1978.
- Antarctic Digital Database (ADD). Scale 1:250000 topographic map of Antarctica. Scientific Committee on Antarctic Research (SCAR), 1993–2016.
