= St. Gorazd Peak =

Mountain in Antarctica

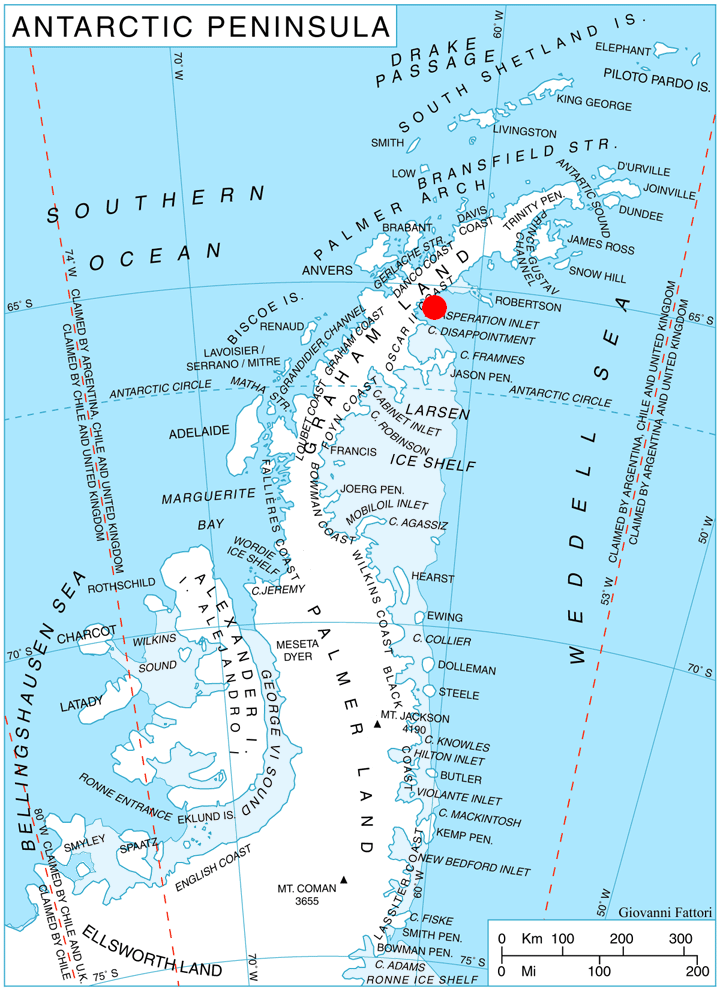
Location of Blagoevgrad Peninsula in Graham Land, Antarctic Peninsula.

St. Gorazd Peak (Bulgarian: връх Св. Горазд, romanized: vrah Sv. Gorazd, IPA: [ˈvrɤx svɛˈti ɡoˈrast]) is the rocky, partly ice-free peak rising to 892 m in southeastern Poibrene Heights on Blagoevgrad Peninsula, Oscar II Coast in Graham Land, Antarctica. It is overlooking Vaughan Inlet to the northeast.

The feature is named after the Great Moravian scholar Saint Gorazd (9-10th century AD), a disciple of St. Cyril and St. Methodius.

== Location ==
St. Gorazd Peak is located at 65°09′03″S 61°47′52″W, which is 2.8 km east of Ravnogor Peak, 8.5 km west of Whiteside Hill and 2.5 km north of Dimcha Peak.

== Maps ==
- Antarctic Digital Database (ADD). Scale 1:250000 topographic map of Antarctica. Scientific Committee on Antarctic Research (SCAR). Since 1993, regularly upgraded and updated.
