= Marchaevo Peak =

Mountain in Antarctica

Location of Oscar II Coast on Antarctic Peninsula.

Marchaevo Peak (Bulgarian: връх Мърчаево, romanized: vrah Marchaevo, IPA: [ˈvrɤx mɐrˈt͡ʃaɛvo]) is the sharp rocky peak rising to 1061 m in the northwest extremity of Zagreus Ridge on Oscar II Coast in Graham Land. It surmounts Hektoria Glacier to the northeast and a tributary to Paspal Glacier to the southwest. The feature is named after the settlement of Marchaevo in Western Bulgaria.

== Location ==
Marchaevo Peak is located at 64°51′21″S 61°52′56″W, which is 10.9 km northeast of Dugerjav Peak, 7.85 km southeast of Mount Walker, and 14.53 km west of Mount Quandary. British mapping in 1978.

== Maps ==
- British Antarctic Territory. Scale 1:200000 topographic map. DOS 610 Series, Sheet W 64 60. Directorate of Overseas Surveys, Tolworth, UK, 1978.
- Antarctic Digital Database (ADD). Scale 1:250000 topographic map of Antarctica. Scientific Committee on Antarctic Research (SCAR). Since 1993, regularly upgraded and updated.
