= Furen Point =

Rocky point on the coast of Antarctica

Location of Oscar II Coast on Antarctic Peninsula.

Furen Point (Bulgarian: нос Фурен, romanized: nos Furen) is the rocky point on Oscar II Coast, Graham Land in Antarctica formed by an offshoot of Yordanov Nunatak, and situated on the northwest coast of Borima Bay. It was formed as a result of the disintegration of Larsen Ice Shelf in the area in 2002 and the subsequent retreat of Jorum Glacier and Minzuhar Glacier.

The feature is named after the settlement of Furen in northwestern Bulgaria.

== Location ==
Furen Point is located at 65°11′45″S 62°07′37″W, which is 6.9 km west of Diralo Point and 9 km northwest of Caution Point.

== Maps ==
- Antarctic Digital Database (ADD). Scale 1:250000 topographic map of Antarctica. Scientific Committee on Antarctic Research (SCAR), 1993–2016.
