= Chernoochene Glacier =

Glacier in Antarctica

- Location of Oscar II Coast on Antarctic Peninsula

- Location within Antarctica
- Location: Graham Land
- Coordinates: 65°17′00″S 62°15′10″W
- Length: 3 nmi (6 km; 3 mi)
- Width: 1 nmi (2 km; 1 mi)
- Thickness: unknown
- Terminus: Spillane Fjord
- Status: unknown

Chernoochene Glacier (Bulgarian: ледник Черноочене, romanized: lednik Chernoochene, IPA: [ˈlɛdnik t͡ʃɛrnuˈɔt͡ʃɛnɛ]) is the 5 km long and 2 km wide glacier on the Oscar II Coast, Graham Land in Antarctica, situated in the southeast foothills of Forbidden Plateau, south of Jorum Glacier and northeast of Crane Glacier. It is draining southeastwards to flow into Spillane Fjord west of Mount Birks.

The feature is named after the settlement of Chernoochene in southern Bulgaria.

== Location ==
Chernoochene Glacier is located at 65°17′00″S 62°15′10″W. British mapping in 1974.

== See also ==
- List of glaciers in the Antarctic
- Glaciology

== Maps ==
- Antarctic Digital Database (ADD). Scale 1:250000 topographic map of Antarctica. Scientific Committee on Antarctic Research (SCAR). Since 1993, regularly upgraded and updated.
