= Veselie Glacier =

Glacier in Graham Land, Antarctica

Location of Oscar II Coast on Antarctic Peninsula.

Veselie Glacier (Bulgarian: ледник Веселие, romanized: lednik Veselie, IPA: [ˈlɛdniɡ vɛˈsɛliɛ]) is the 7 km long and 2.5 km wide glacier in Austa Ridge on Oscar II Coast in Graham Land situated southeast of Jorum Glacier and northeast of Chernoochene Glacier. It flows east-southeastwards along the north slopes of Mount Birks to enter Spillane Fjord west-southwest of Caution Point. The feature is named after the settlement of Veselie in Southeastern Bulgaria.

== Location ==
Veselie Glacier is located at 65°16′15″S 62°10′00″W. British mapping in 1976.

== Maps ==
- British Antarctic Territory. Scale 1:200000 topographic map. DOS 610 Series, Sheet W 65 62. Directorate of Overseas Surveys, Tolworth, UK, 1976.
- Antarctic Digital Database (ADD). Scale 1:250000 topographic map of Antarctica. Scientific Committee on Antarctic Research (SCAR). Since 1993, regularly upgraded and updated.
