= St. Sava Peak =

Rocky, partly ice-free peak in Antarctica

Location of Oscar II Coast on Antarctic Peninsula.

St. Sava Peak (Bulgarian: връх Св. Сава, romanized: vrah Sv. Sava, IPA: [ˈvrɤx svɛˈti ˈsavɐ]) is the rocky, partly ice-free peak rising to 872 m in Poibrene Heights on Oscar II Coast, Graham Land in Antarctica. It is overlooking Vaughan Inlet to the east-northeast.

The feature is named after the Bulgarian scholar St. Sava Sedmochislenik (9-10th century AD), a disciple of St. Cyril and St. Methodius.

== Location ==
St. Sava Peak is located at 65°06′53″S 61°53′22″W, which is 4.9 km north-northwest of Ravnogor Peak, 3.8 km southeast of Kamenov Spur and 12.9 km west-northwest of Whiteside Hill.

== Maps ==
- Antarctic Digital Database (ADD). Scale 1:250000 topographic map of Antarctica. Scientific Committee on Antarctic Research (SCAR). Since 1993, regularly upgraded and updated.
