= Tepava Ridge =

Ridge in Graham Land, Antarctica

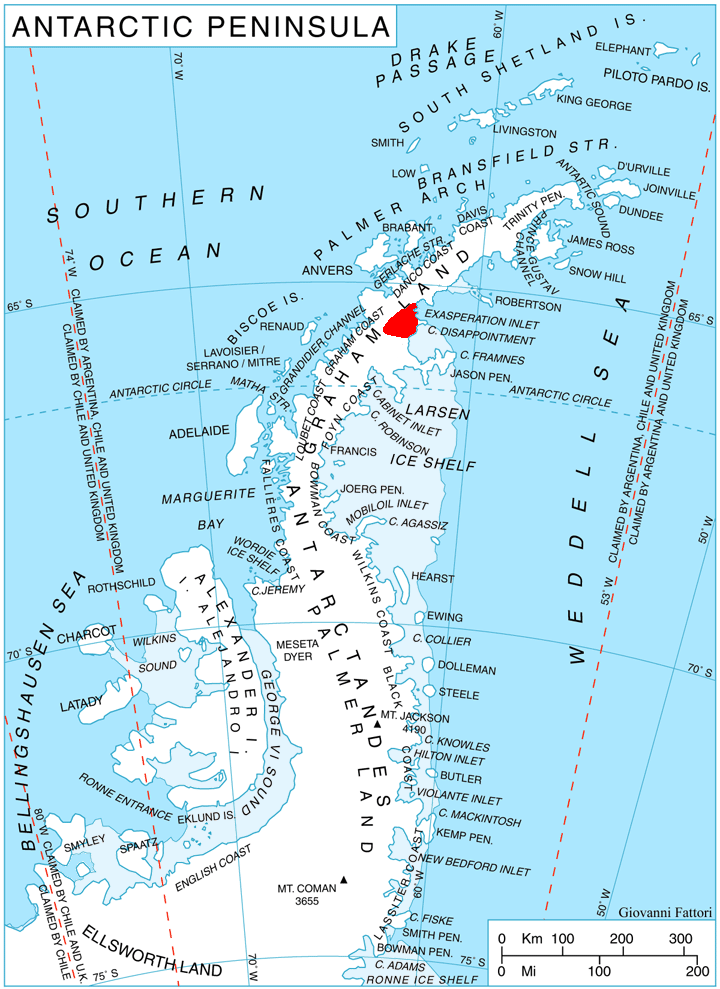
Location of Aristotle Mountains on the Antarctic Peninsula.

Tepava Ridge (Bulgarian: хребет Тепава, ‘Hrebet Tepava’ \'hre-bet te-'pa-va\) is the narrow rocky ridge extending 7.55 km towards Sandilh Point to the east, 1.6 km wide, and rising to 653 m at its west extremity in eastern Aristotle Mountains on Oscar II Coast in Graham Land. It surmounts to the north and south the branches of Pequod Glacier flowing into Exasperation Inlet and Durostorum Bay respectively. The feature is named after the settlement of Tepava in Northern Bulgaria.

== Location ==
Tepava Ridge is centred at 65°29′54″S 62°01′58″W. British mapping in 1976.

== Maps ==
- British Antarctic Territory. Scale 1:200000 topographic map. DOS 610 Series, Sheet W 65 62. Directorate of Overseas Surveys, Tolworth, UK, 1976.
- Antarctic Digital Database (ADD). Scale 1:250000 topographic map of Antarctica. Scientific Committee on Antarctic Research (SCAR). Since 1993, regularly upgraded and updated.
