= Kamenov Spur =

Location of Oscar II Coast on Antarctic Peninsula.

Kamenov Spur (Bulgarian: Каменов връх, romanized: Kamenov vrah, IPA: [ˈkamɛnov ˈvrɤx]) is the rocky, partly ice-free peak rising to 818 m in Poibrene Heights on Oscar II Coast, Graham Land in Antarctica. It is overlooking Evans Glacier to the north.

The feature is named after Borislav Kamenov, geologist in the first Bulgarian Antarctic campaign in 1987–1988.

== Location ==
Kamenov Spur is located at 65°05′39″S 61°57′12″W, which is 3.8 km northwest of St. Sava Peak, 5.7 km east of Vishna Pass and 6.5 km southeast of Mount Bistre.

== Maps ==
- Antarctic Digital Database (ADD). Scale 1:250000 topographic map of Antarctica. Scientific Committee on Antarctic Research (SCAR), 1993–2016.
