= Kesten Point =

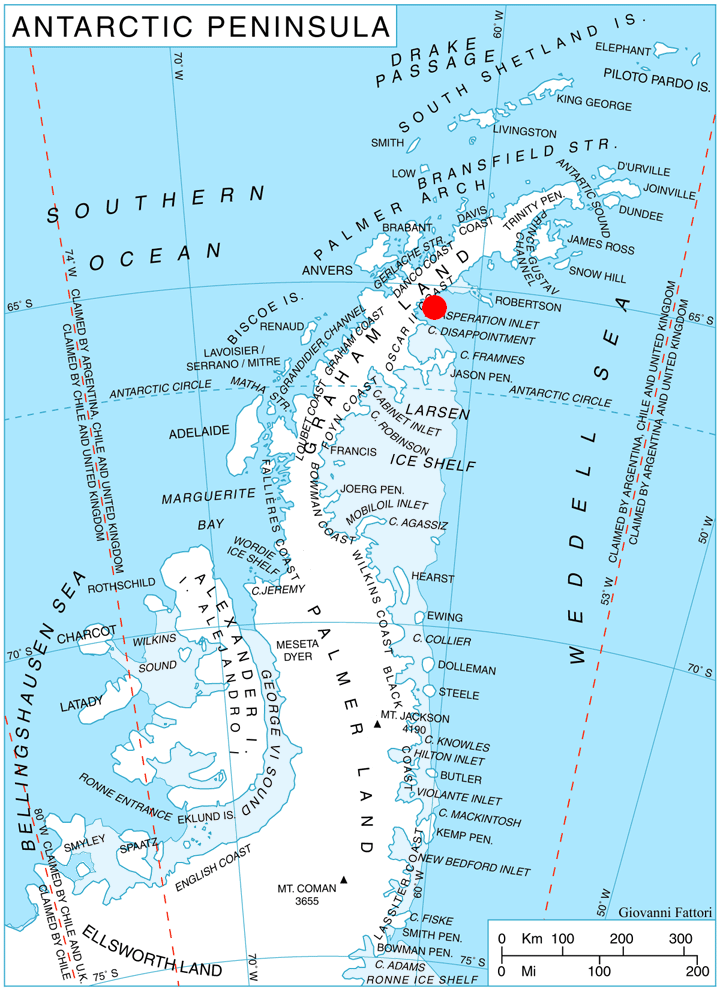
Location of Blagoevgrad Peninsula in Graham Land, Antarctic Peninsula.

Kesten Point (Bulgarian: нос Кестен, ‘Nos Kesten’ \'nos 'kes-ten\) is the partly ice-free point on the south side of the entrance to Yamforina Cove on Blagoevgrad Peninsula, Oscar II Coast in Graham Land, Antarctica. It was formed as a result of the break-up of Larsen Ice Shelf in the area in 2002.

The feature is named after the settlement of Kesten in southern Bulgaria.

== Location ==
Kesten Point is located at 65°11′58″S 61°35′30″W, which is 4.6 km north of Foyn Point, 9 km east of Tikale Peak, and 4.55 km south-southwest of Daskot Point. SCAR Antarctic Digital Database mapping in 2012.

== Maps ==
- Antarctic Digital Database (ADD). Scale 1:250000 topographic map of Antarctica. Scientific Committee on Antarctic Research (SCAR). Since 1993, regularly upgraded and updated.
