= Daskot Point =

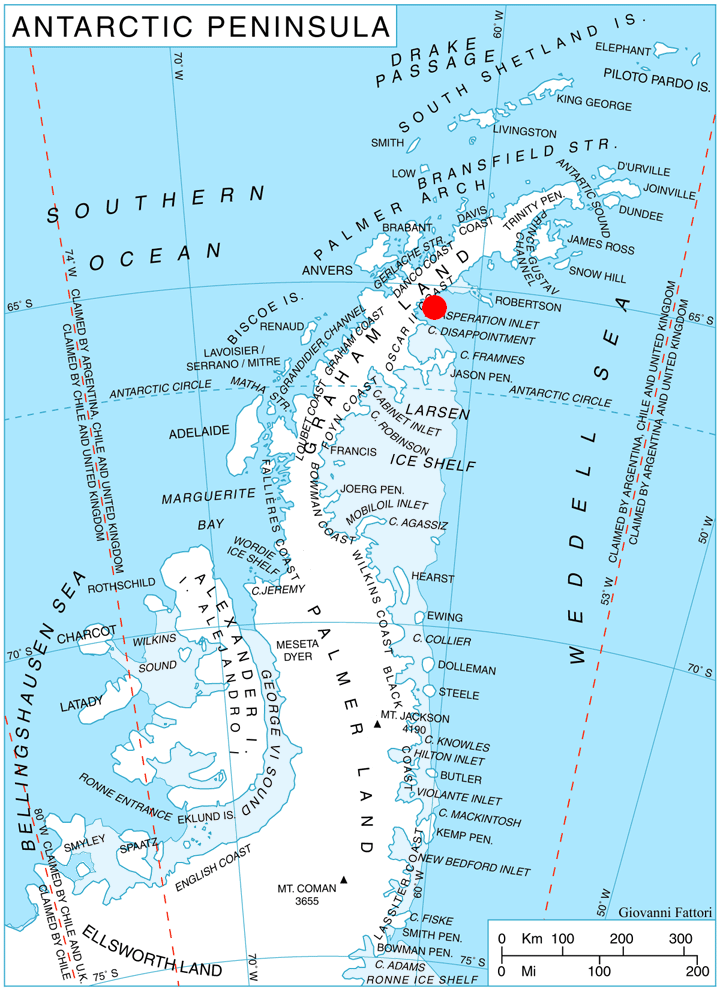
Location of Blagoevgrad Peninsula in Graham Land, Antarctic Peninsula.

Daskot Point (Bulgarian: нос Дъскот, ‘Nos Daskot’ \'nos d&-'skot\) is the ice-covered point on the north side of the entrance to Yamforina Cove on Blagoevgrad Peninsula, Oscar II Coast in Graham Land, Antarctica. It was formed as a result of the break-up of Larsen Ice Shelf in the area in 2002.

The feature is named after the settlement of Daskot in northern Bulgaria.

== Location ==
Daskot Point is located at 65°09′41″S 61°33′22″W, which is 11.38 km east of St. Gorazd Peak, 4.3 km south of Whiteside Point, and 4.55 km north-northeast of Kesten Point. SCAR Antarctic Digital Database mapping in 2012.

== Maps ==
- Antarctic Digital Database (ADD). Scale 1:250000 topographic map of Antarctica. Scientific Committee on Antarctic Research (SCAR). Since 1993, regularly upgraded and updated.
