= Dzhebel Glacier =

Glacier in Antarctica

Location of Oscar II Coast on Antarctic Peninsula.

Dzhebel Glacier (Bulgarian: ледник Джебел, romanized: lednik Dzhebel, IPA: [ˈlɛdniɡ ˈd͡ʒɛbɛɫ]) is the 15 km long and 11 km wide glacier on Oscar II Coast, Graham Land in Antarctica situated southwest of Jorum Glacier, northeast of Chuchuliga Glacier and southeast of Goodwin Glacier. It is draining from the slopes of Bruce Plateau and Forbidden Plateau, and flowing southeastwards to join Crane Glacier.

The feature is named after the town of Dzhebel in southern Bulgaria.

== Location ==
Dzhebel Glacier is located at 65°17′40″S 62°42′10″W. British mapping in 1974.

== Maps ==
- Antarctic Digital Database (ADD). Scale 1:250000 topographic map of Antarctica. Scientific Committee on Antarctic Research (SCAR). Since 1993, regularly upgraded and updated.
