= Ranyari Point =

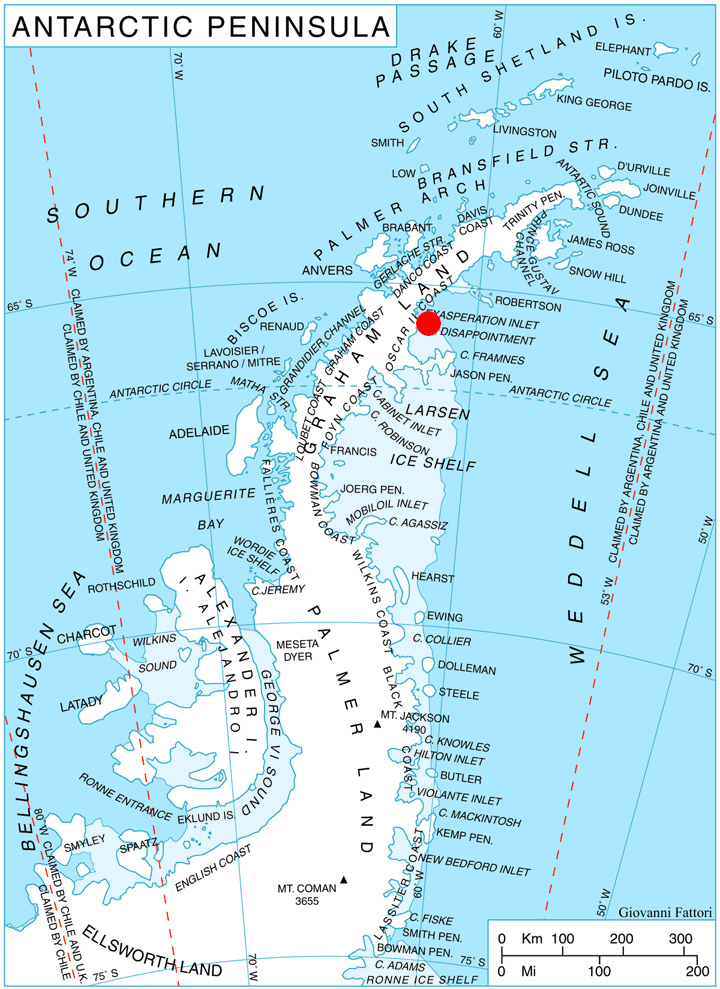
Location of Heros Peninsula in Graham Land, Antarctic Peninsula.

Ranyari Point (Bulgarian: нос Раняри, ‘Nos Ranyari’ \'nos ra-'nya-ri\) is the rounded ice-covered point on the southeast side of the entrance to Durostorum Bay on Oscar II Coast in Graham Land. It is situated on the north coast of Akra Peninsula, and was formed as a result of the break-up of Larsen Ice Shelf in the area in the early 21st century. Named after the Bulgar ruler Ranyari (6th century).

== Location ==
Ranyari Point is located at 65°31′53″S 61°49′00″W, which is 6.7 km southeast of Sandilh Point and 5.2 km west of the north extremity of Cape Disappointment. SCAR Antarctic Digital Database mapping in 2012.

== Maps ==
- Antarctic Digital Database (ADD). Scale 1:250000 topographic map of Antarctica. Scientific Committee on Antarctic Research (SCAR). Since 1993, regularly upgraded and updated.
