= Minzuhar Glacier =

Glacier in Antarctica

Location of Oscar II Coast on Antarctic Peninsula.

Minzuhar Glacier (Bulgarian: ледник Минзухар, romanized: lednik Minzuhar, IPA: [ˈlɛdnik minzoˈxar]) is the 6.5 km long and 3 km wide glacier on Oscar II Coast, Graham Land in Antarctica situated southwest of Punchbowl Glacier and northeast of Jorum Glacier. It is draining from the southeast slopes of Forbidden Plateau southeastwards between Metlichina Ridge and Yordanov Nunatak to flow into Borima Bay north of Furen Point.

The feature is named after the settlement of Minzuhar in southern Bulgaria.

== Location ==
Minzuhar Glacier is located at 65°09′35″S 62°08′30″W. British mapping in 1974.

== Maps ==
- Antarctic Digital Database (ADD). Scale 1:250000 topographic map of Antarctica. Scientific Committee on Antarctic Research (SCAR), 1993–2016.
