= Tikale Peak =

Mountain in the Antarctic

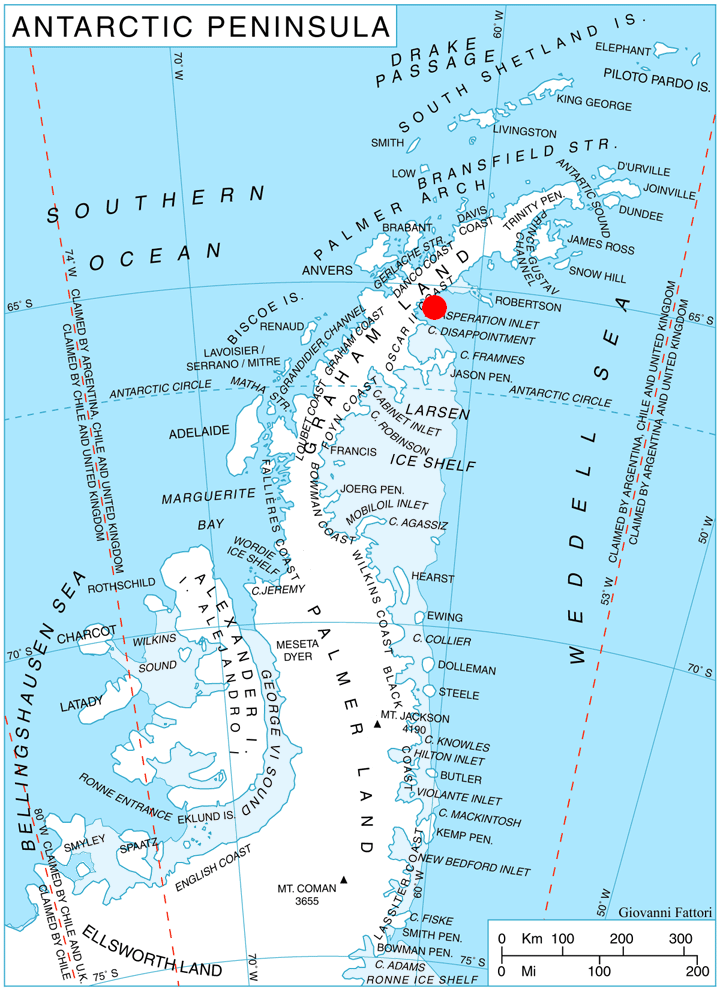
Location of Blagoevgrad Peninsula in Graham Land, Antarctic Peninsula.

Tikale Peak (Bulgarian: връх Тикале, romanized: vrah Tikale, IPA: [ˈvrɤx tiˈkalɛ]) is the rocky, partly ice-free peak rising to 613 m in southeastern Poibrene Heights on Blagoevgrad Peninsula, Oscar II Coast in Graham Land, Antarctica.

The feature is named after the settlement of Tikale in southern Bulgaria.

== Location ==
Tikale Peak is located at 65°11′44″S 61°47′03″W, which is 5.5 km north of Kunino Point, 5.55 km southeast of Ravnogor Peak and 9.85 km northwest of Foyn Point.

== Maps ==
- Antarctic Digital Database (ADD). Scale 1:250000 topographic map of Antarctica. Scientific Committee on Antarctic Research (SCAR). Since 1993, regularly upgraded and updated.
