= Dimcha Peak =

Mountain in Antarctica

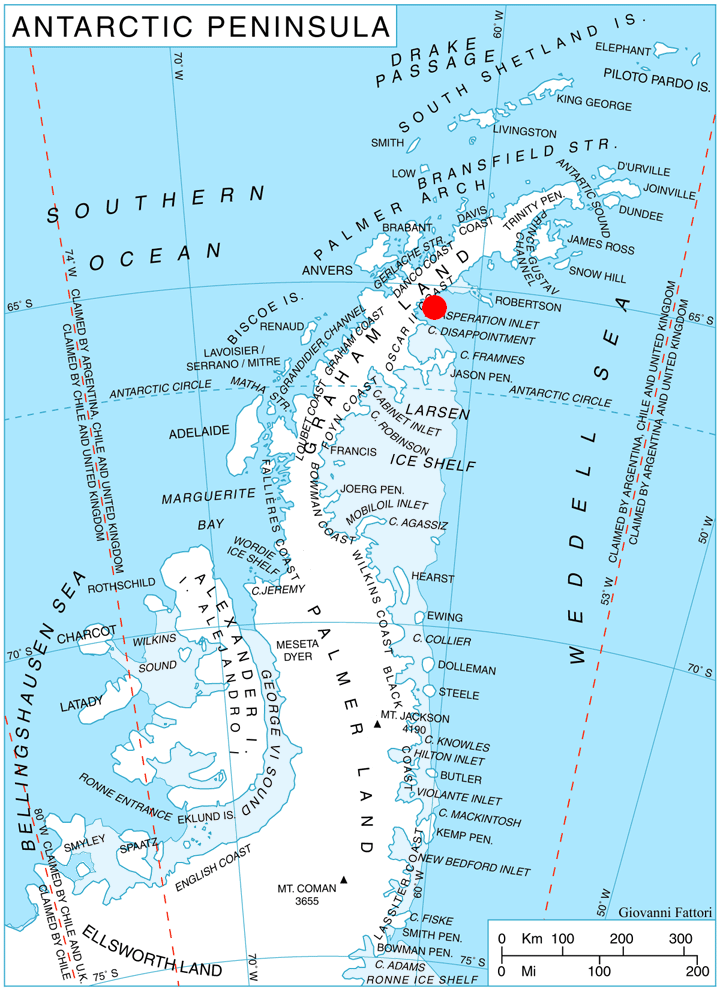
Location of Blagoevgrad Peninsula in Graham Land, Antarctic Peninsula.

Dimcha Peak (Bulgarian: връх Димча, romanized: vrah Dimcha, IPA: [ˈvrɤɣ ˈdimt͡ʃɐ]) is the rocky, partly ice-free peak rising to 948 m in southeastern Poibrene Heights on Blagoevgrad Peninsula, Oscar II Coast in Graham Land, Antarctica.

The feature is named after the settlement of Dimcha in northern Bulgaria.

== Location ==
Dimcha Peak is located at 65°10′23″S 61°47′30″W, which is 3.55 km southeast of Ravnogor Peak, 9 km southwest of Whiteside Hill and 2.5 km north of Tikale Peak.

== Maps ==
- Antarctic Digital Database (ADD). Scale 1:250000 topographic map of Antarctica. Scientific Committee on Antarctic Research (SCAR), 1993–2016.
