= St. Angelariy Peak =

Mountain in Antarctica

Location of Oscar II Coast on Antarctic Peninsula.

St. Angelariy Peak (Bulgarian: връх Св. Ангеларий, romanized: vrah Sv. Angelariy, IPA: [ˈvrɤx svɛˈti ɐŋɡɛˈɫarij]) is the rocky, partly ice-free peak rising to 980 m in Metlichina Ridge on Oscar II Coast, Graham Land in Antarctica. It is overlooking Punchbowl Glacier to the north and east, and Minzuhar Glacier to the southwest.

The feature is named after the Bulgarian scholar Saint Angelar (9th century AD), a disciple of Saints Cyril and Methodius.

== Location ==
St. Angelariy Peak is located at 65°08′39″S 62°04′28″W, which is 4.75 km south of Vishna Pass, 2.8 km west of Andreev Nunatak, 7.88 km northwest of Diralo Point and 6.9 km northeast of Yordanov Nunatak. British mapping in 1974.

== Maps ==
- Antarctic Digital Database (ADD). Scale 1:250000 topographic map of Antarctica. Scientific Committee on Antarctic Research (SCAR), 1993–2016.
