= Yordanov Nunatak =

Nunatak in Graham Land, Antarctica

Location of Oscar II Coast on Antarctic Peninsula.

Yordanov Nunatak (Bulgarian: Йорданов нунатак, ‘Yordanov Nunatak’ \yor-da-'nov 'nu-na-tak\) is the rocky ridge 5 km long and 2.6 km wide, with twin heights rising to 876 m (central one) and 885 m (western one) on the coast of Borima Bay, between Jorum Glacier and Minzuhar Glacier on Oscar II Coast, Graham Land in Antarctica.

The feature is named after Yordan Yordanov, engineer at St. Kliment Ohridski base in 2001/02 and base commander in subsequent seasons.

== Location ==
Yordanov Nunatak is located at 65°11′32″S 62°10′01″W, which is 6.9 km southwest of St. Angelariy Peak, 8.82 km west of Diralo Point and 10.55 km northwest of Caution Point. British mapping in 1974.

== Maps ==
- Antarctic Digital Database (ADD). Scale 1:250000 topographic map of Antarctica. Scientific Committee on Antarctic Research (SCAR), 1993–2016.
