= Musina Glacier =

Glacier in Antarctica

Location of Oscar II Coast on Antarctic Peninsula.

Musina Glacier (Bulgarian: ледник Мусина, romanized: lednik Musina, IPA: [ˈlɛdnik ˈmusinɐ]) is the 7 km long and 3.5 km wide glacier on Oscar II Coast, Graham Land in Antarctica situated south of Green Glacier and north of Evans Glacier. Draining eastwards between the two principal branches of Rugate Ridge to flow into Vaughan Inlet, Weddell Sea.

The feature is named after the settlement of Musina in northern Bulgaria.

== Location ==
Musina Glacier is centred at 65°01′30″S 61°51′00″W.

== Maps ==
- Antarctic Digital Database (ADD). Scale 1:250000 topographic map of Antarctica. Scientific Committee on Antarctic Research (SCAR). Since 1993, regularly upgraded and updated.
