= Austa Ridge =

Location of Oscar II Coast on Antarctic Peninsula.

Austa Ridge (Bulgarian: хребет Ауста, ‘Hrebet Austa’ \'hre-bet a-'us-ta\) is the partly ice-free ridge extending 24 km and 11 km wide on Oscar II Coast in Graham Land descending eastwards from the south extremity of Forbidden Plateau towards Caution Point. It rises to over 1800 m at its west extremity, and surmounts Jorum Glacier and Borima Bay to the north, Exasperation Inlet to the east, and Spillane Fjord and Crane Glacier to the south. The feature is named after the settlement of Austa in Southern Bulgaria.

== Location ==
Austa Ridge is centred at 65°15′30″S 62°16′00″W. British mapping in 1976.

== Maps ==
- British Antarctic Territory. Scale 1:200000 topographic map. DOS 610 Series, Sheet W 65 62. Directorate of Overseas Surveys, Tolworth, UK, 1976.
- Antarctic Digital Database (ADD). Scale 1:250000 topographic map of Antarctica. Scientific Committee on Antarctic Research (SCAR), 1993–2016.
