= Hristo Tatarchev =

Macedonian Bulgarian revolutionary (1869–1952)

- Христо Татарчев
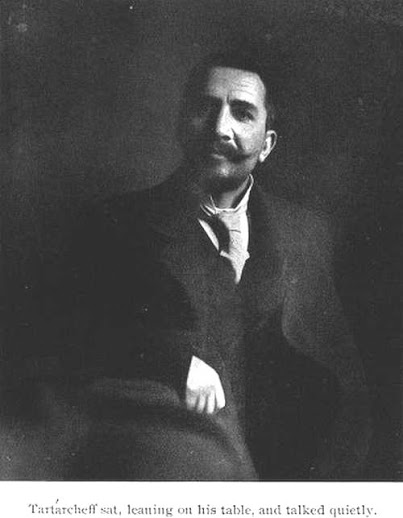
- Hristo Tatarchev c. 1903
- Born: 16 December 1869; Resen, Ottoman Empire
- Died: 5 January 1952 (aged 82); Turin, Italy
- Burial place: Sofia Central Cemetery
- Education: University of Zurich
- Military career
- Allegiance: Tsardom of Bulgaria; IMRO
- Branch: Bulgarian Army
- Conflicts: Serbo-Bulgarian War; Balkan Wars; First Balkan War; Bulgarian front; Second Balkan War; World War I; Macedonian front
- Other work: Physician, author, member of the Macedonian Federative Organization

Hristo Tatarchev (Macedonian and Bulgarian: Христо Татарчев; 16 December 1869 – 5 January 1952) was a Macedonian Bulgarian doctor, revolutionary and one of the founders of the Internal Macedonian Revolutionary Organization (IMRO). Tatarchev was the first president of IMRO's Central Committee.

== Biography ==
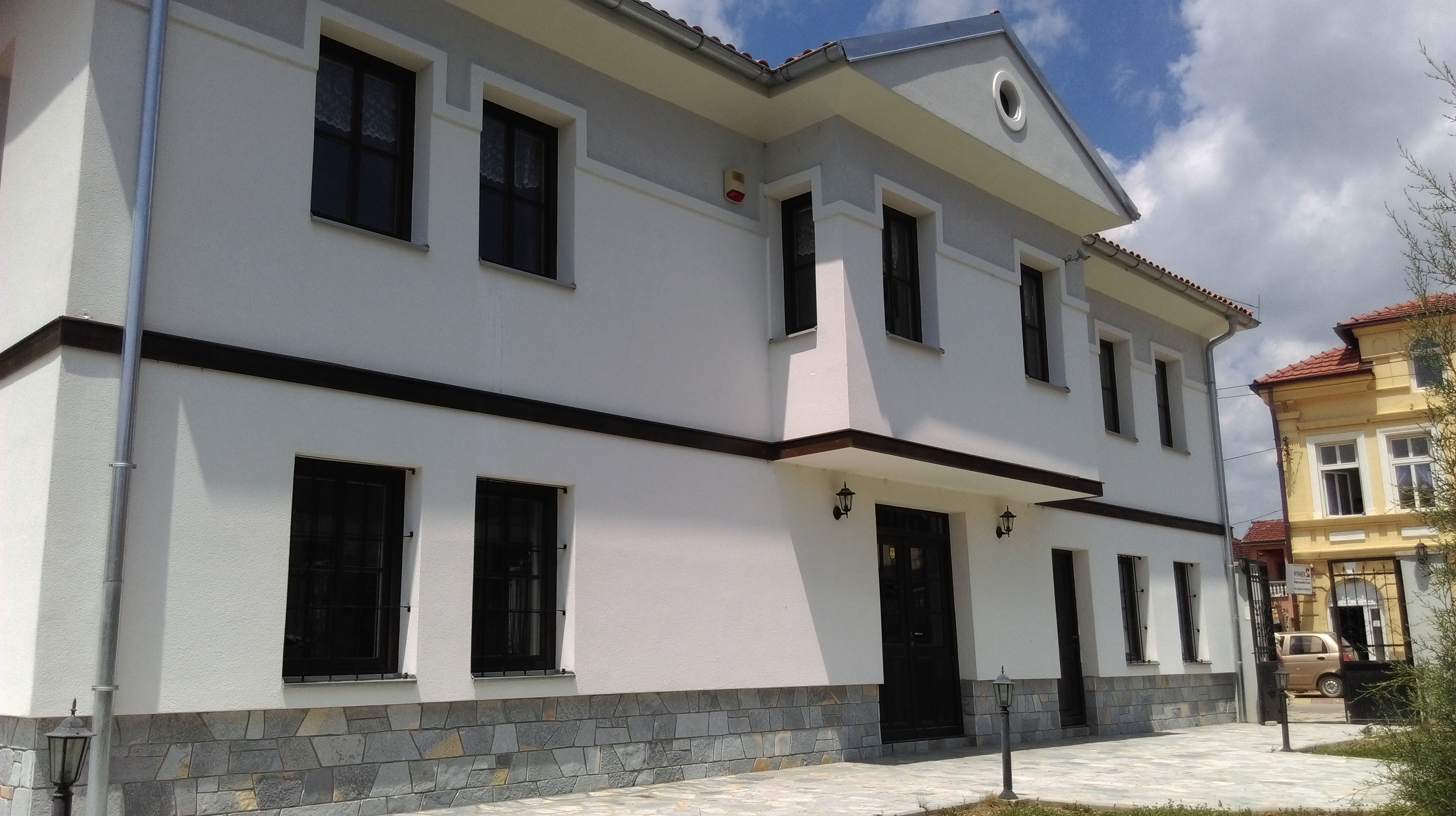
House of Hristo Tatarchev (now museum) in Resen

Tatarchev was born on 16 December 1869 in the town of Resen, in the Ottoman Empire (present-day North Macedonia), to a rich merchant family. His father Nikola was a banker and merchant, and a leading member of the Bulgarian Exarchist community in Resen, while his mother Katerina was a descendant of a prominent family from Jankovec. When he was eight, Albanian bandits robbed his home, and his mother ended up dying due to the shock from the experience. Tatarchev received his initial education in Resen, then he moved to Eastern Rumelia and studied in Bratsigovo and eventually at the secondary school for boys in Plovdiv. He participated in the Unification of Bulgaria and enrolled in a students' legion, which took part in the Serbo-Bulgarian War of 1885. Influenced by socialist ideas, Tatarchev wanted to go abroad to study philosophy, but his father insisted on medicine. He ended up studying medicine at the University of Zurich and completed his degree in Medicine in Berlin in 1892. He returned to Ottoman Macedonia in 1892, where he worked as a physician at the local Bulgarian secondary school for boys in Thessaloniki. Tatarchev had treated Dame Gruev for eczema. He talked with Gruev about what they as Bulgarians should do to improve the political condition of their people, with both of them agreeing that it was necessary to find other like-minded people, and Gruev took up the task.

He was a founding member of the Internal Macedonian Revolutionary Organization, which was established on 23 October 1893 in Thessaloniki. In official documents and personal correspondence, he wrote in standard Bulgarian, with dialectal influences. In January 1894, he was elected President of the Central Committee of IMRO. Tatarchev participated in the Thessaloniki Congress of IMRO in 1896. Regarding the discussions about the aims of IMRO, in his 1928 memoirs, Tatarchev wrote:

We discussed the aims of this organisation at length and later we settled on the autonomy of Macedonia, with the predominance of the Bulgarian element. We could not accept the principle of the 'direct unification of Macedonia with Bulgaria' because we could see that this would be opposed by the Great Powers and by the aspirations of the small neighbouring states and Turkey. It came to our minds that an autonomous Macedonia could later be more easily united with Bulgaria, or, if this could not be achieved, it could be the uniting link of a federation of the Balkan peoples.

In early 1901, after an IMRO activist gave up names of activists under torture, he and Hristo Matov were arrested by the Ottoman authorities and sent into exile in Bodrum Castle in Asia Minor. He was released in 1902 and became a representative of the Foreign Committee of the IMRO in Sofia, along with Matov.

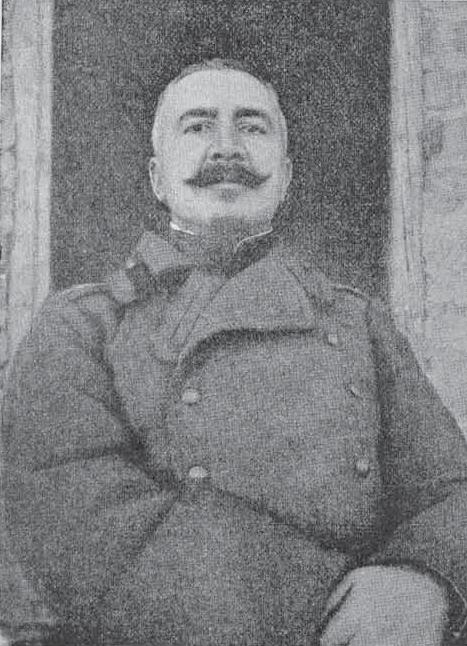
Hristo Tatarchev as a surgeon in the Bulgarian army during the Great War.

On 24 December 1902, Ivan Garvanov announced a congress in January 1903 to discuss about an uprising. He participated in discussions with other leading IMRO figures in Sofia, where he came out in support of a general uprising along with Matov, arguing that the authorities had already arrested too many members and that it was time to act. After the Ilinden–Preobrazhenie Uprising of 1903, along with Matov and Garvanov, he became a leader of IMRO's centralist faction. Tatarchev attended the Kyustendil congress of IMRO in March 1908, where he condemned the Serres faction along with the rest of the participants, after the assassination of Ivan Garvanov and Boris Sarafov.

During the Balkan Wars and the First World War, he served as a surgeon in the Bulgarian Army. In 1920, he entered the Macedonian Federative Organization. Shortly after that, Tatarchev was forced to emigrate to Italy, because of significant discord between then IMRO's leader Todor Alexandrov and him. There he wrote his memoirs, and all the time until the Second World War he wrote articles for the newspapers "Macedonia", "Zarya", "Vardar". In his newspapers, he actively criticized the Serbian and Yugoslavian government for the Serbianisation of the Macedonian Slavs. Tatarchev became a close friend of the new leader of the IMRO, Ivan Mihailov. He lived briefly in his native Resen during the Second World War, when Macedonia was annexed by Bulgaria (1941–1944). Later he returned to Sofia, but in 1943 after the bombings there, Tatarchev moved to Nova Zagora. The Germans offered him in 1944 to become a president of the Independent State of Macedonia, but he refused, because the Red Army was entering Bulgaria. Bulgaria also ordered its troops to prepare for withdrawal from former Yugoslavia. After the end of the Second World War, he and his family were persecuted by the authorities of PR Bulgaria and DFR Yugoslavia. Thus Tatarchev returned to Turin, where he also communicated with Mihailov, who moved to Italy as well. He died on 5 January 1952 in Turin. Tatarchev was buried there.

=== Relatives ===
Tatarchev's relatives were also involved in the Macedonian revolutionary movement. His brother Mihail was an activist of IMRO and the mayor of Resen during the Bulgarian occupation of Serbia in the First World War, when he was killed.

His nephew, Asen Tatarchev, was also an IMRO activist in the interwar period. In 1946, he was sentenced to death, later commuted to life imprisonment, by the Yugoslav authorities for collaborating with the Bulgarian occupational authorities during World War II.

Tatarchev's grand nephew, Ivan Tatarchev, became Bulgaria’s prosecutor general after the fall of communism and was elected honorary chairman of the IMRO – Bulgarian National Movement in the 1990s.

Tatarchev married Sophia Logothetis, a daughter of the Greek consul in Bitola.

== Legacy ==
In North Macedonia, he is seen as an ethnic Macedonian revolutionary.

In December 2009, his remains were brought from Turin to Bulgaria by VMRO-BND, a political party claiming descent from IMRO. Tatarchev's reburial took place in Central Sofia Cemetery, on 23 October 2010, 117 years since the founding of IMRO. In 2004, his birthplace collapsed due to old age and neglect, but it was rebuilt as a memorial house with the initiative of the VMRO-DPMNE government led by Nikola Gruevski, opening on 4 April 2016.

Tatarchev Nunatak on Oscar II Coast in Graham Land, Antarctica, is named after him.
