= Durostorum Bay =

Bay in Antarctica

Location of Oscar II Coast on Antarctic Peninsula.

Durostorum Bay (Bulgarian: залив Дуросторум, ‘Zaliv Durostorum’ \'za-liv du-ro-'sto-rum\) is the 6.7 km wide bay indenting for 3.9 km Oscar II Coast in Graham Land southeast of Sandilh Point and northwest of Ranyari Point. It is part of Exasperation Inlet, formed as a result of the break-up of Larsen Ice Shelf in the area and the retreat of Pequod Glacier in the early 21st century, and named after the ancient town of Durostorum in Northeastern Bulgaria.

== Location ==
Durostorum Bay is located at 65°31′40″S 61°53′50″W. SCAR Antarctic Digital Database mapping in 2012.

== Maps ==
- Antarctic Digital Database (ADD). Scale 1:250000 topographic map of Antarctica. Scientific Committee on Antarctic Research (SCAR). Since 1993, regularly upgraded and updated.
