= Rozovo, Pazardzhik Province =

Rozovo Розово
- Village
- Location within Bulgaria
- Coordinates: 42.017°N 24.367°E

Government
  - Mayor: Yordanka Petkova (GERB)

Area
  - Total: 26.393 km^{2} (10.190 sq mi)

Population
  - Total: 372
  - Density: 14.1/km^{2} (36.5/sq mi)
- Time zone: UTC+2 (EET)
  - Summer (DST): UTC+3 (EEST)

Rozovo (Bulgarian: Розово, pronounced [ˈrɔzɔvɔ]) is a village located in Bratsigovo Municipality, Pazardzhik Province, Southern Bulgaria. It is 4 km (2.5 mi) from Bratsigovo and 8 km (5.0 mi) from the village Ravnogor.

== Geography ==
It is located in a mountainous region, which are the Rhodopes. It is around 650–700 m above sea level, which makes a good condition to plant vegetables or fruits. There are many strawberry and rose plantations planted during World War II, which coined the name Rozovo.

== History ==
It is established in the end of the XVII or in the very beginning of XVIII centuries. On the territory there are ancient citadels found as follows: Gerkinsko, Kievsko, Stoilsko, Yurushko, Tamrashko and Gradishko fortresses. The main occupation of the local at that time has been agriculture, cattle-breeding and coal production. The first school in the region is built between 1861 and 1865, which today is in poor condition. The local library "Prosveta" is established in 1911. The old name for the village was Chanakchievo.

== Localities ==
Rozovski vriz, 7 kilometres away from Rozovo, is a villa resort, established in 1972. It has 112 houses and a capacity up to 1000 people. It is 1200 m above sea level. It is split into Buk mahalla and the centre. According to an old custom, on the third Sunday of July, the traditional gathering of the village of Rozovo - the Feast of the Rozovo Strawberry, is held at the Rozovski vriz summer resort. The locality takes its name from the fact that many waters spring and collect there, leading to a micro-dam called Gyuvecha. The place is popular for recreation in summer and winter because of its unspoilt nature and crystal clear water and air. The lake can be used for fishing, and there is also a fountain and a gazebo with picnic and barbecue facilities.

Close to Rozovo is also the locality "Tumara", declared a protected area for the preservation of the landscape and rock formations in the region and of old Roman roads, bridges and remains of fortress walls.
