= Evans Glacier =

Evans Glacier may refer to:

- Evans Glacier (Graham Land), Antarctica
- Evans Glacier (Queen Alexandra Range), Antarctica
- Evans Glacier (New Zealand)
