= Brenitsa Glacier =

Glacier in Antarctica

- Location of Oscar II Coast on Antarctic Peninsula

- Location within Antarctica
- Location: Graham Land
- Coordinates: 64°53′10″S 61°29′50″W
- Length: 7 nmi (13 km; 8 mi)
- Width: 2 nmi (4 km; 2 mi)
- Thickness: unknown
- Terminus: Vaughan Inlet
- Status: unknown

Brenitsa Glacier (Bulgarian: ледник Бреница, romanized: lednik Brenitsa, IPA: [ˈlɛdniɡ brɛˈnit͡sɐ]) is the 14 km long and 4.5 km wide glacier on Oscar II Coast, Graham Land in Antarctica situated southwest of Drygalski Glacier, west of Rogosh Glacier and east of Hektoria Glacier. Draining southwards from the south slopes of Foster Plateau east of Mount Quandary to flow into Vaughan Inlet, Weddell Sea next east of Hektoria Glacier.

The feature is named after the settlements of Brenitsa in northern and northeastern Bulgaria.

== Location ==
Brenitsa Glacier is centred at 64°53′10″S 61°29′50″W. British mapping in 1974.

== See also ==
- List of glaciers in the Antarctic
- Glaciology

== Maps ==
- Antarctic Digital Database (ADD). Scale 1:250000 topographic map of Antarctica. Scientific Committee on Antarctic Research (SCAR). Since 1993, regularly upgraded and updated.
