= Pirne Peak =

Mountain in Antarctica

Location of Oscar II Coast on Antarctic Peninsula.

Pirne Peak (Bulgarian: връх Пирне, romanized: vrah Pirne, IPA: [ˈvrɤx pirˈnɛ]) is the rocky peak rising to 802 m on the coast of Vaughan Inlet, at the northeast extremity of Rugate Ridge on Oscar II Coast in Graham Land. It surmounts Green Glacier to the northwest and Musina Glacier to the southwest. The feature is named after the settlement of Pirne in Southeastern Bulgaria.

== Location ==
Pirne Peak is located at 64°59′38″S 61°47′40″W, which is 13.7 km northeast of Mount Bistre, 13.18 km south of Sekirna Spur, 13.4 km west of Mural Nunatak, and 18 km northwest of Whiteside Hill. British mapping in 1978.

== Maps ==
- British Antarctic Territory. Scale 1:200000 topographic map. DOS 610 Series, Sheet W 64 60. Directorate of Overseas Surveys, Tolworth, UK, 1978.
- Antarctic Digital Database (ADD). Scale 1:250000 topographic map of Antarctica. Scientific Committee on Antarctic Research (SCAR). Since 1993, regularly upgraded and updated.
