= Dugerjav Peak =

Mountain in Antarctica

Location of Oscar II Coast on Antarctic Peninsula.

Dugerjav Peak (Mongolian: Дүгэржав оргил, Bulgarian: връх Дугержав, romanized: vrah Dugerzhav, IPA: [ˈvrɤɣ ˈduɡɛrʒɐf]) is the rocky peak rising to 1208 m in the southeast foothills of Forbidden Plateau on Oscar II Coast in Graham Land. It surmounts Paspal Glacier to the northeast and Green Glacier to the south. The feature is named after the pioneer of Mongolian Antarctic research Lhamsuren Dugerjav, geologist at St. Kliment Ohridski Base in 2010/11 and subsequent seasons.

== Location ==
Dugerjav Peak is located at 64°55′26″S 62°02′21″W, which is 11.9 km south of Mount Walker, 13 km west-southwest of Sekirna Spur, 14.4 km north of Mount Bistre, and 16.25 km southeast of Mechit Buttress on Danco Coast. British mapping in 1980.

== Maps ==
- British Antarctic Territory. Scale 1:200000 topographic map. DOS 610 Series, Sheet W 64 62. Directorate of Overseas Surveys, Tolworth, UK, 1980.
- Antarctic Digital Database (ADD). Scale 1:250000 topographic map of Antarctica. Scientific Committee on Antarctic Research (SCAR), 1993–2016.
