= Yamforina Cove =

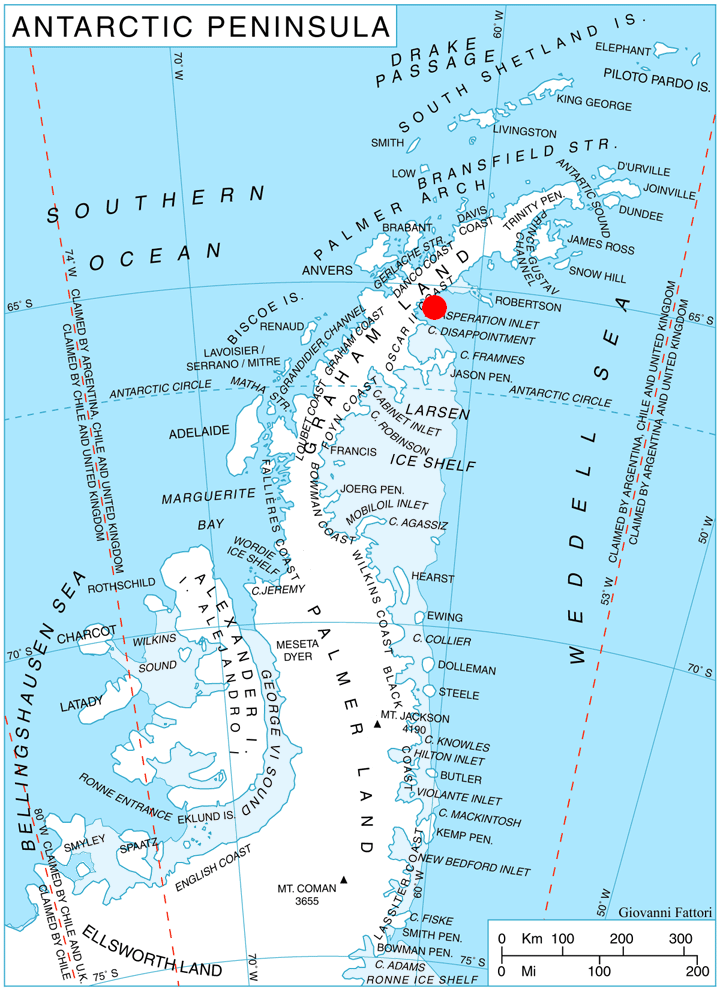
Location of Blagoevgrad Peninsula in Graham Land, Antarctic Peninsula.

Yamforina Cove (Bulgarian: залив Ямфорина, ‘Zaliv Yamforina’ \'za-liv yam-fo-'ri-na\) is the 4.55 km wide cove indenting for 3.1 km the east coast of Blagoevgrad Peninsula on Oscar II Coast in Graham Land, Antarctica. It is entered south of Daskot Point and north of Kesten Point, and was formed as a result of the break-up of Larsen Ice Shelf in the area in 2002, and subsequent deglaciation.

The feature is named after the ancient Thracian settlement of Yamforina in southwestern Bulgaria.

== Location ==
Yamforina Cove is located at 65°10′55″S 61°36′30″W. SCAR Antarctic Digital Database mapping in 2012.

== Maps ==
- Antarctic Digital Database (ADD). Scale 1:250000 topographic map of Antarctica. Scientific Committee on Antarctic Research (SCAR). Since 1993, regularly upgraded and updated.
