= Kunino Point =

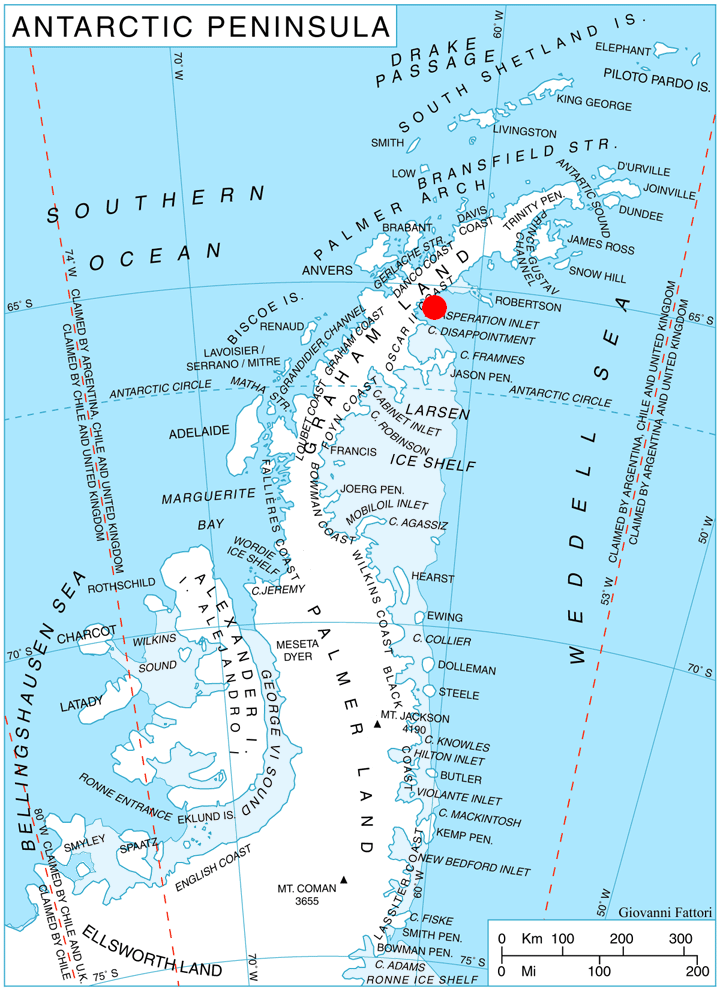
Location of Blagoevgrad Peninsula in Graham Land, Antarctic Peninsula.

Kunino Point (Bulgarian: нос Кунино, ‘Nos Kunino’ \'nos ku-ni-'no\) is a rocky point on Blagoevgrad Peninsula, Oscar II Coast, Graham Land in Antarctica, the south extremity of an eponymous ridge extending 2.4 by 2 km on the north coast of Exasperation Inlet. Formed in 2002 as a result of the disintegration of Larsen Ice Shelf in the area.

The feature is named after the settlement of Kunino in northwestern Bulgaria.

== Location ==
Kunino Point is located at 65°14′41″S 61°47′36″W, which is 10.25 km east of Caution Point, 8.9 km west of Foyn Point and 35 km north of Cape Disappointment.

== Maps ==
- Antarctic Digital Database (ADD). Scale 1:250000 topographic map of Antarctica. Scientific Committee on Antarctic Research (SCAR), 1993–2016.
