= Akra Peninsula =

Peninsula in Antarctic

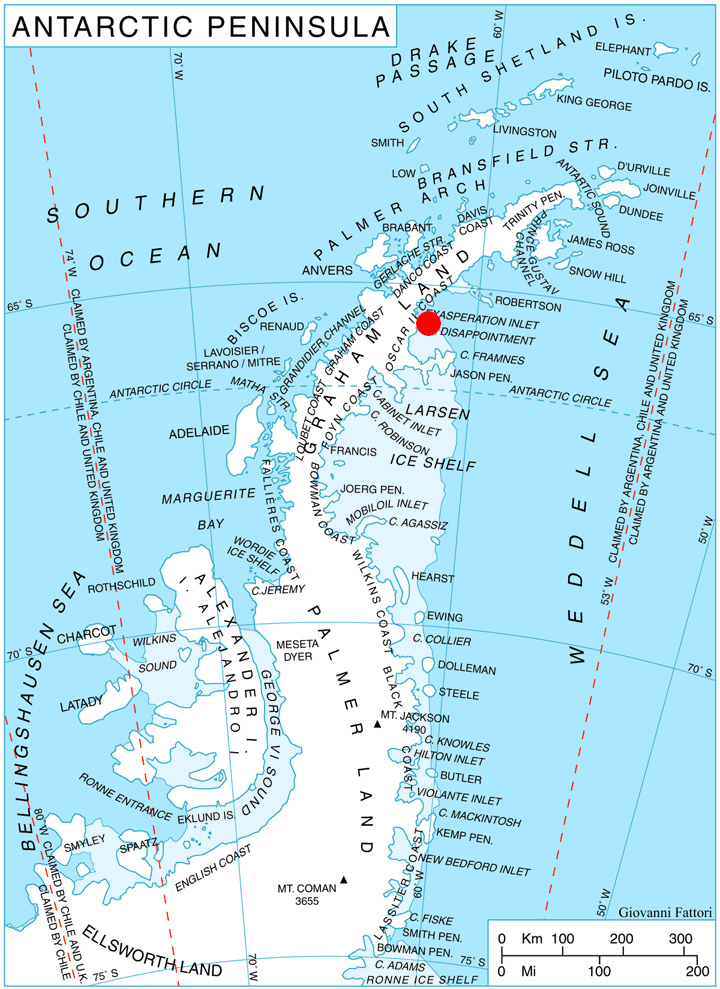
Location of Akra Peninsula in Graham Land, Antarctic Peninsula.

Akra Peninsula (Bulgarian: полуостров Акра, romanized: poluostrov Akra, IPA: [poɫuˈɔstrof ˈakrɐ]) is the mostly ice-covered peninsula projecting 11 km eastwards from Oscar II Coast in Graham Land, and 5.2 km wide, bounded by Exasperation Inlet to the north and Scar Inlet to the south, and ending in Cape Disappointment to the east. It was formed as a result of the break-up of Larsen Ice Shelf in the area, and the retreat of Pequod Glacier in the early 21st century. The feature is named after the ancient town of Akra in Southeastern Bulgaria.

== Location ==
Akra Peninsula is located at 65°33′10″S 61°49′00″W. SCAR Antarctic Digital Database mapping in 2012.

== Maps ==
- Antarctic Digital Database (ADD). Scale 1:250000 topographic map of Antarctica. Scientific Committee on Antarctic Research (SCAR). Since 1993, regularly upgraded and updated.
