= Ravnogor Peak =

Location of Oscar II Coast on Antarctic Peninsula.

Ravnogor Peak (Bulgarian: връх Равногор, romanized: vrah Ravnogor, IPA: [ˈvrɤx rɐvnoˈɡɔr]) is the rocky, partly ice-free peak rising to 937 m in southeastern Poibrene Heights on Oscar II Coast, Graham Land in Antarctica.

The feature is named after the settlement of Ravnogor in southern Bulgaria.

== Location ==
Ravnogor Peak is located at 65°09′22″S 61°51′23″W, which is 11.3 km west of Whiteside Hill, 15.15 km northwest of Foyn Point, 10.3 km north-northwest of Kunino Point, 7.8 km northeast of Diralo Point and 4.9 km south-southeast of St. Sava Peak.

== Maps ==
- Antarctic Digital Database (ADD). Scale 1:250000 topographic map of Antarctica. Scientific Committee on Antarctic Research (SCAR). Since 1993, regularly upgraded and updated.
