= Furen =

Furen may refer to:

- Fūren, Hokkaido, town Hokkaido, Japan
- Lake Furen, lake in Hokkaido, Japan
- Furen Point, rocky point in Antarctica
- Furen University, or Fu Jen Catholic University, university in Taiwan
- Furen Literary Society, Hong Kong organization
