= Bratsigovo Municipality =

- Municipality
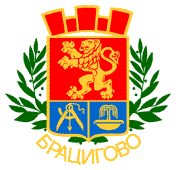
- Coat of arms

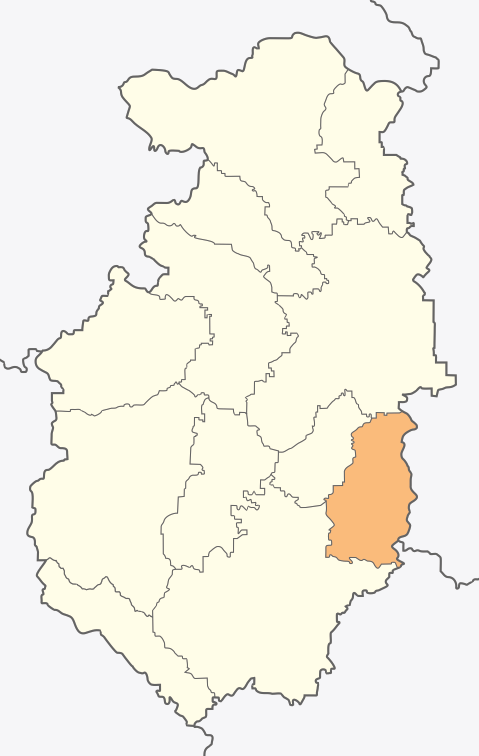
- Location of Bratsigovo Municipality in Pazardzhik Province

- Location of Bratsigovo Municipality in Bulgaria
- Coordinates: 42°01′01″N 24°22′01″E
- Country: Bulgaria
- Province: Pazardzhik Province
- Capital: Bratsigovo

Area
  - Total: 210.65 km^{2} (81.33 sq mi)
- Elevation: 815 m (2,674 ft)

Population (2011)
  - Total: 9,648
  - Density: 45.80/km^{2} (118.6/sq mi)
- Postal code: 4579
- Area code: 03552

Bratsigovo Municipality (Bulgarian: Община Брацигово) is a municipality in the Pazardzhik Province of Bulgaria.

== Demography ==
Ethnic composition of Bratsigovo Municipality
1. Bulgarians (79.3%)
2. Turks (6.73%)
3. Gypsies/Romani (4.09%)
4. No identification (9.55%)
5. Other (0.30%)

At the 2011 census, the population of Bratsigovo was 9,648. Most of the inhabitants (79.31%) were Bulgarians, and there were significant minorities of Gypsies/Romani (4.09%) and Turks (6.73%). 9.55% of the population's ethnicity was unknown.

== Communities ==
=== Towns ===
- Bratsigovo

=== Villages ===
- Byaga
- Isperihovo
- Kozarsko
- Ravnogor
- Rozovo
- Zhrebichko
