= Sandilh Point =

Location of Oscar II Coast on Antarctic Peninsula.

Sandilh Point (Bulgarian: нос Сандилх, ‘Nos Sandilh’ \'nos san-'dilh\) is the partly ice-free point on the northwest side of the entrance to Durostorum Bay on Oscar II Coast in Graham Land. It is situated at the east extremity of Tepava Ridge, and was formed as a result of the break-up of Larsen Ice Shelf in the area, and the retreat of Pequod Glacier in the early 21st century. Named after the Bulgar ruler Sandilh (6th century).

== Location ==
Sandilh Point is located at 65°29′55″S 61°56′17″W, which is 7.5 km southeast of Kalina Point and 6.7 km northwest of Ranyari Point. SCAR Antarctic Digital Database mapping in 2012.

== Maps ==
- Antarctic Digital Database (ADD). Scale 1:250000 topographic map of Antarctica. Scientific Committee on Antarctic Research (SCAR). Since 1993, regularly upgraded and updated.
