= Ravnogor =

Ravnogor Равногор
- Village
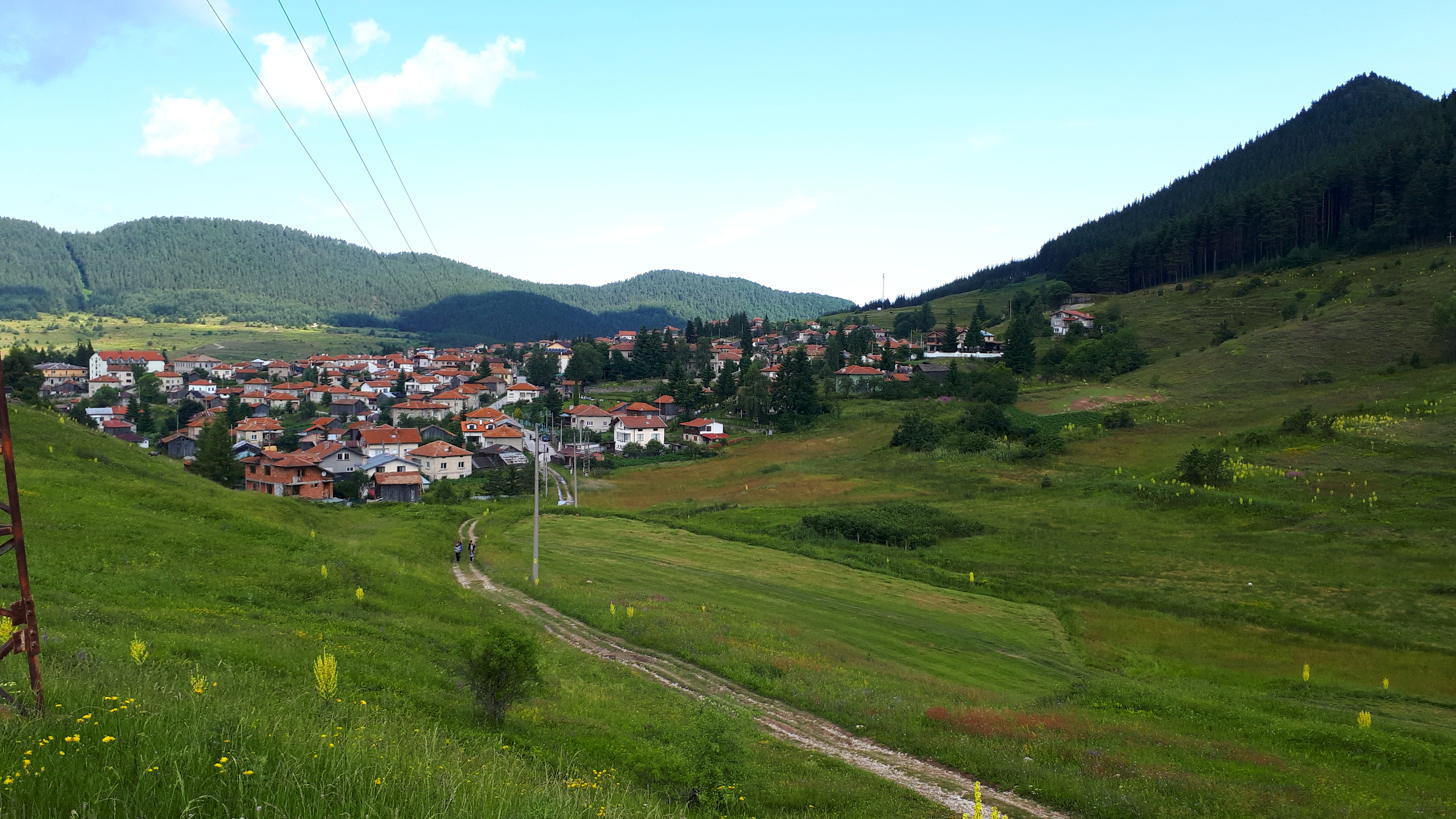

- Location within Bulgaria
- Coordinates: 41°57′4.28″N 24°22′4.37″E

Government
  - Mayor: Neycho Kolanev (GERB)

Area
  - Total: 78.348 km^{2} (30.250 sq mi)
- Elevation: 1,319 m (4,327 ft)

Population
  - Total: 440
  - Density: 5.6/km^{2} (15/sq mi)
- Time zone: UTC+2 (EET)
  - Summer (DST): UTC+3 (EEST)

Ravnogor (Bulgarian: Равногор) is a village located in Bratsigovo Municipality, Pazardzhik Province, Southern Bulgaria.

== Geography ==
Ravnogor is located in a mountainous area. The elevation is 1319 m. There is a peak named St. Nedelya with an elevation of 1578 m. The Ravnogor plateau has many potato farms scattered across it. The climate is continental mountainous, characterized with late and cold spring, cool summers and long and snowy winters.

== History ==
The tribe Bessi lived in the territory of Ravnogor, who have left behind over 30 Thracian sanctuaries and tombs, the famous one being the Ravnogor Tomb, which was first discovered in 1986 by a group of villagers during a potato sowing. It is the biggest domed tomb in Bulgaria.

The village itself was established and officially registered as a settlement in 1777. Unlike the nearby villages Fotinovo and Nova Mahala, unique traditions have been followed. They all remained Orthodox Christians, after unsuccessful attempts by the Ottoman rulers to convert them to Islam. During communist rule, Bratsigovo was affected by it, with Ravnogor being an exception.

== Infrastructure ==
The infrastructure of Ravnogor is settled with partly asphalted streets and lighting, sewerage system, electric and water-supply systems, telephone lines, coverage of mobile operators and Internet. There is a road to Fotinovo, but in critical condition and considered a dirt road.

Bus transportation is the only public transport facility in Ravnogor.

== Resorts ==
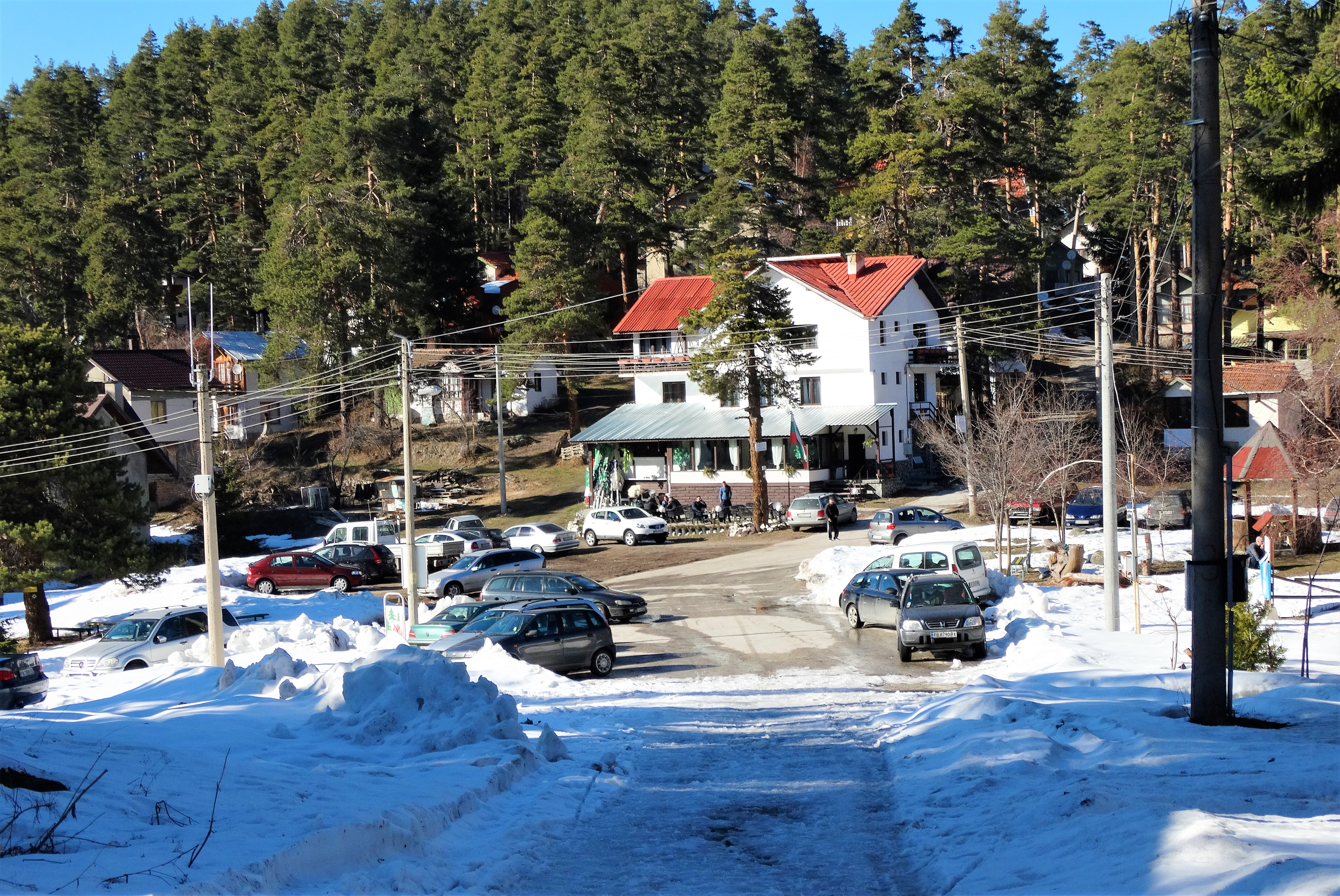
Atoluka

The only resort near Ravnogor is Atoluka (Bulgarian: Атолука), also known as Vasil Petleshkov. It was first established in 1906. In 1923, it was used as a base for the Bratsigovo Partisan Detachment. On August 5, 1969, the land around the resort was declared a protected area of Atoluka in order to preserve the centuries-old coniferous forest of pinus sylvestris and spruce.
