= Zhrebichko =

Zhrebichko Жребичко
- Village
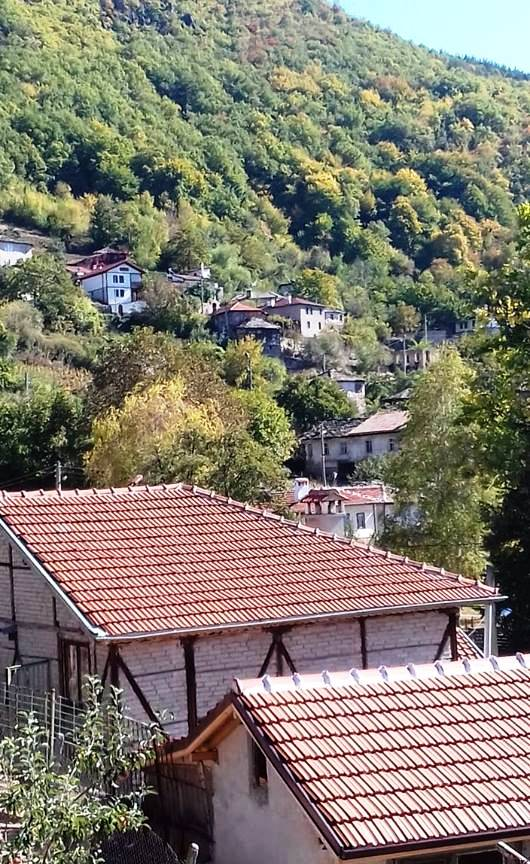

- Location within Bulgaria
- Coordinates: 42°1′42.43″N 24°25′34.61″E
- Country: Bulgaria

Area
  - Total: 31.45 km^{2} (12.14 sq mi)
- Elevation: 734 m (2,408 ft)

Population
  - Total: 48
  - Density: 1.5/km^{2} (4.0/sq mi)
- Time zone: UTC+2 (EET)
  - Summer (DST): UTC+3 (EEST)

Zhrebichko (Bulgarian: Жребичко) is a village located in Bratsigovo Municipality, Pazardzhik Province, Southern Bulgaria.

Zhrebichko is located in a mountainous area in the Rhodope Mountains. The climate is typically continental mountainous with snowy winters and cool summers.

== History ==
There are tens of archaeological finds near or in Zhrebichko, which include images of Thracian rider coins, marble sculptures, bas reliefs, and paintings.

The village dates back to the earliest discovered Ottoman register in 1451. It is considered an old village, with the walls of The Small and Big Ivankovi fortress guarding it. According to legends, the previous location of Zhrebichko was in the territory of Bachishte. The name is derived from the legend of a lost colt called Zhrebche, which was found by its owners in today's Zhrebichko territory. The first education institutions were in houses, then the church cell. Тogether with the church was built in 1850. Sveta Troitsa is the oldest church in the entirety of the municipality.

In 2000, Zhrebichko was declared an architectural reserve.
