= Vishna =

Village in Burgas Province, Bulgaria

- Village
- Location in Bulgaria
- Coordinates: 42.894°N 27.187°E
- Country: Bulgaria
- Province: Burgas Province
- Municipality: Ruen Municipality
- Time zone: UTC+2 (EET)
  - Summer (DST): UTC+3 (EEST)

Vishna is a village in Ruen Municipality, in Burgas Province, in southeastern Bulgaria.

Vishna Pass in Antarctica is named after the village.
