= Travnik, Bulgaria =

Travnik
- Village
- Location within Bulgaria
- Coordinates: 43°36′N 28°16′E
- Country: Bulgaria
- Province: Dobrich Province
- Municipality: Kavarna
- Time zone: UTC+2 (EET)
  - Summer (DST): UTC+3 (EEST)

Travnik is a village in Kavarna Municipality, Dobrich Province, northeastern Bulgaria.

Travnik Buttress in Antarctica is named after the village.
