= Rugate Ridge =

Rugate Ridge (65°1′S 61°56′W) is a high, east-trending ridge between Green and Evans Glaciers on the east side of Graham Land. It ends up in Pirne Peak on the northeast and Nedev Peak on the southeast, with Musina Glacier flowing in between. Surveyed by Falkland Islands Dependencies Survey (FIDS) in 1955. So named by United Kingdom Antarctic Place-Names Committee (UK-APC) because many small ridges and spurs make up the feature ("rugate" means "ridgy").
