= Metlichina Ridge =

Location of Oscar II Coast on Antarctic Peninsula.

Metlichina Ridge (Bulgarian: хребет Метличина, ‘Hrebet Metlichina’ \'hre-bet me-'tli-chi-na\) is the partly ice-free ridge extending 12.6 km in northwest-southeast direction, 3.9 km wide and rising to 980 m (St. Angelariy Peak) on Oscar II Coast, Graham Land in Antarctica. It is bounded by Punchbowl Glacier to the northeast, Exasperation Inlet to the south and Minzuhar Glacier to the southwest, and linked to Forbidden Plateau to the northwest.

The feature is named after the settlements of Metlichina in northeastern and southern Bulgaria.

== Location ==
The midpoint of Metlichina Ridge is located at 65°10′00″S 62°04′00″W. British mapping in 1974.

== Maps ==
- Antarctic Digital Database (ADD). Scale 1:250000 topographic map of Antarctica. Scientific Committee on Antarctic Research (SCAR), 1993–2016.
