= Paspal Glacier =

Glacier in Antarctica

Location of Oscar II Coast on Antarctic Peninsula.

Paspal Glacier (Bulgarian: ледник Паспал, romanized: lednik Paspal, IPA: [ˈlɛdnik ˈpaspɐɫ]) is the 14.5 km long and 6.5 km wide glacier on Oscar II Coast, Graham Land in Antarctica situated southeast of Montgolfier Glacier and west of Hektoria Glacier. Draining from the southeast slopes of Forbidden Plateau and flowing southeastwards between Zagreus Ridge and Dugerjav Peak to join Green Glacier.

The feature is named after the settlement of Paspal in southern Bulgaria.

== Location ==
Paspal Glacier is centred at 64°53′50″S 61°59′10″W. British mapping in 1974.

== Maps ==
- Antarctic Digital Database (ADD). Scale 1:250000 topographic map of Antarctica. Scientific Committee on Antarctic Research (SCAR), 1993–2016.
