= Borima Bay =

Graham land

Location of Oscar II Coast on Antarctic Peninsula.

Borima Bay (Bulgarian: залив Борима, romanized: zaliv Borima, IPA: [ˈzaliv ˈbɔrimɐ]) is the 6.5 km wide cove indenting for 8 km Oscar II Coast in Graham Land, Antarctica south of Diralo Point and north of Caution Point. It is part of Exasperation Inlet, Weddell Sea formed as a result of the disintegration of Larsen Ice Shelf in the area in 2002 and the subsequent retreat of Jorum Glacier and Minzuhar Glacier.

The feature is named after the settlement of Borima in northern Bulgaria.

== Location ==
Borima Bay is located at 65°12′50″S 62°06′00″W.

== Maps ==
- Antarctic Digital Database (ADD). Scale 1:250000 topographic map of Antarctica. Scientific Committee on Antarctic Research (SCAR), 1993–2016.
