= Diralo Point =

Location of Oscar II Coast on Antarctic Peninsula.

Diralo Point (Bulgarian: нос Дирало, ‘Nos Diralo’ \'nos di-'ra-lo\) is the rocky point at the southeast extremity of Metlichina Ridge, forming the north side of the entrance to Borima Bay on Oscar II Coast, Graham Land in Antarctica. It was formed as a result of the disintegration of Larsen Ice Shelf in the area in 2002 and the subsequent retreat of Jorum Glacier.

The feature is named after the settlement of Diralo in southern Bulgaria.

== Location ==
Diralo Point is located at 65°12′10″S 61°58′49″W, which is 9.9 km northwest of Kunino Point and 6.5 km north-northeast of Caution Point.

== Maps ==
- Antarctic Digital Database (ADD). Scale 1:250000 topographic map of Antarctica. Scientific Committee on Antarctic Research (SCAR), 1993–2016.
