= Mount Birks =

Mountain of Graham Land, Antarctica

Location of Oscar II Coast on Antarctic Peninsula.

Mount Birks (65°18′S 62°10′W) is a conspicuous, pyramid-shaped mountain rising to 1,035 m in Antarctica in Austa Ridge on Oscar II Coast in Graham Land, and surmounting Spillane Fjord to the south and Veselie Glacier to the north. In 1928 Sir Hubert Wilkins gave the name Mount Napier Birks, after Napier Birks of Adelaide, Australia, to two conspicuous, black peaks which he observed and photographed from the air as lying close north of his Crane Channel. This coast was charted by the Falkland Islands Dependencies Survey (FIDS) in 1947, but it has not been possible to identify Wilkins' Mount Napier Birks. Since Crane Channel was definitely identified as Crane Glacier, the United Kingdom Antarctic Place-Names Committee (UK-APC) recommended in 1950 that the name, shortened to Mount Birks, be given to this conspicuous mountain lying close north of the mouth of the glacier.
