= Cape Disappointment (Antarctica) =

Headland in Graham Land, Antarctica

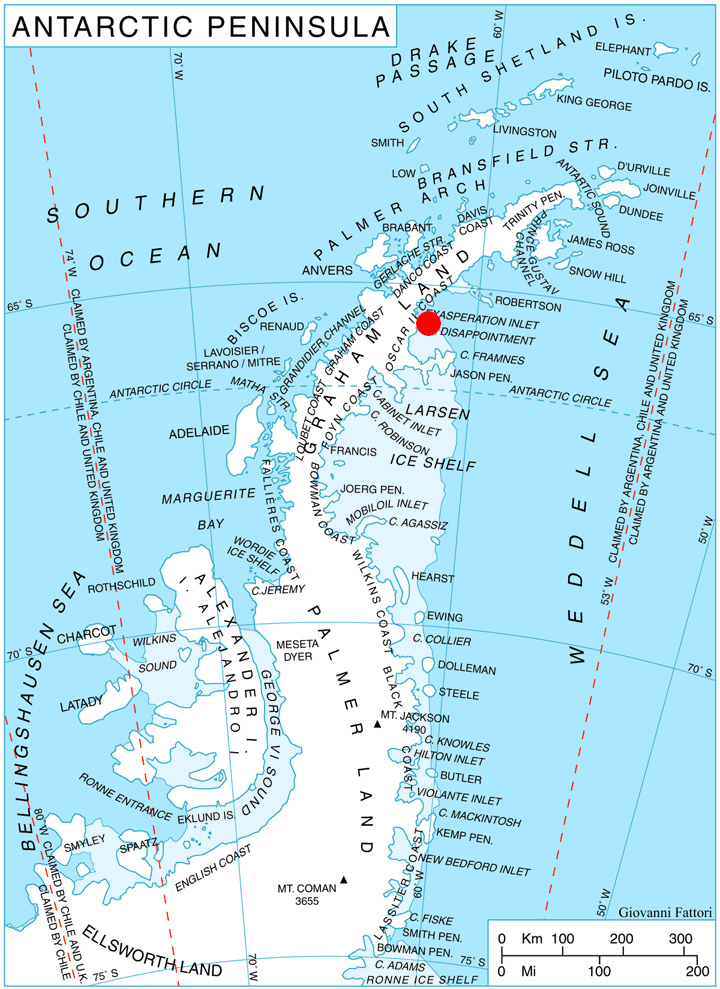
Location of Heros Peninsula in Graham Land in the Antarctic

Cape Disappointment (65°33′S 61°43′W) is a cape which marks the tip of the ice-covered Akra Peninsula lying between Exasperation Inlet and Scar Inlet, on the east coast of Graham Land. It was discovered in 1902 by the Swedish Antarctic Expedition, under Otto Nordenskiöld, and so named by him because he encountered many difficult crevasses in approaching the cape.
