= Crane Glacier =

Glacier in the Aristotle Mountains of the Antarctic Peninsula

- Location of Oscar II Coast on Antarctic Peninsula

- Location within Antarctica
- Location: Graham Land
- Coordinates: 65°20′S 62°15′W
- Length: 50 km (31 mi)
- Thickness: unknown
- Terminus: Spillane Fjord
- Status: unknown

Crane Glacier (65°20′S 62°15′W) is a narrow glacier which flows 30 miles (50 km) in an east-northeasterly direction along the northwest side of Aristotle Mountains to enter Spillane Fjord south of Devetaki Peak, on the east coast of the Antarctic Peninsula.

== Name ==
Sir Hubert Wilkins photographed this feature from the air in 1928 and gave it the name "Crane Channel", after C.K. Crane of Los Angeles, reporting that it appeared to be a channel cutting in an east-west direction across the peninsula.

The name was altered to "Crane Inlet" following explorations along the west coast of the peninsula in 1936 by the British Graham Land Expedition, which proved that no through channel from the east coast existed as indicated by Wilkins. Comparison of Wilkins' photograph of this feature with those taken in 1947 by the Falkland Islands Dependencies Survey shows that Wilkins' "Crane Channel" is this glacier, although it lies about 75 miles (120 km) northeast of the position originally reported by Wilkins.

== Glacial speed ==
The speed of Crane Glacier increased threefold after the collapse of the Larsen B Ice Shelf in 2002 and this is likely to be due to the removal of a buttressing effect of the ice shelf.

== Tributary glaciers ==
- Dzhebel Glacier
- Chuchuliga Glacier
- Stob Glacier

== See also ==
- List of glaciers in the Antarctic
- List of Antarctic ice streams
- Glaciology
