= Mount Walker =

Mountain in Graham Land, Antarctica

Mount Walker (64°49′S 62°1′W) is a snow-covered mountain which rises from the northeast part of Forbidden Plateau, 2 nautical miles (3.7 km) south of the head of Blanchard Glacier, in northern Graham Land, Antarctica. It was surveyed by Falkland Islands Dependencies Survey (FIDS) in 1955. Named by United Kingdom Antarctic Place-Names Committee (UK-APC) for Richard Walker of the Discovery Investigations, First Officer on RRS Discovery II, 1933–37.
