= Spillane Fjord =

Fjord in Antarctica

Spillane Fjord is a fjord in front of Crane Glacier in the western part of Exasperation Inlet, Oscar II Coast in Graham Land, entered between Caution Point and Delusion Point. The feature is 2 miles wide, 10 miles long and averages 1000 m deep. Its greatest depth is 1250 m at the far west end of the fjord. The fjord was created by the catastrophic retreat of Crane Glacier, which was itself caused by the breakup of the north portion of the Larsen Ice Shelf in March, 2002. The fjord's creation was documented by satellite images and the feature was first visited by surface ship in April 2006 during the U.S. Antarctic Program NBP06-03 cruise, when the extent, depth and dimension were determined by swath bathymetry. Named by US-ACAN in 2007 after Joshua Spillane who served the USAP as a marine technician aboard L.M. Gould and N.B. Palmer. He lost his life in Drake Passage, April 16, 2006, while L.M. Gould was transiting from Palmer Station to Punta Arenas, Chile.

== Location ==
Spillane Fjord is located at 65°36′00″S 62°14′40″W. Antarctic Digital Database mapping in 2012.

== Maps ==
- Antarctic Digital Database (ADD). Scale 1:250000 topographic map of Antarctica. Scientific Committee on Antarctic Research (SCAR), 1993–2016.
