= Zagreus Ridge =

Location of Oscar II Coast on Antarctic Peninsula.

Zagreus Ridge (Bulgarian: хребет Загрей, ‘Hrebet Zagrey’ \'hre-bet za-'grey\) is the partly ice-free ridge extending 10 km and 3.8 km wide, rising to 1061 m (Marchaevo Peak) on Oscar II Coast in Graham Land. It descends from Forbidden Plateau southeastwards between Hektoria Glacier and Paspal Glacier. The feature is named after the Thracian god Zagreus.

== Location ==
Zagreus Ridge is centred at 64°52′50″S 61°49′00″W. British mapping in 1978.

== Maps ==
- British Antarctic Territory. Scale 1:200000 topographic map. DOS 610 Series, Sheet W 64 60. Directorate of Overseas Surveys, Tolworth, UK, 1978.
- Antarctic Digital Database (ADD). Scale 1:250000 topographic map of Antarctica. Scientific Committee on Antarctic Research (SCAR). Since 1993, regularly upgraded and updated.
