= Mount Bistre (Antarctica) =

Mountain in Graham Land, Antarctica

Mount Bistre (65°3′S 62°3′W) is a mountain on the north side of Evans Glacier on the east side of Graham Land. It was surveyed by the Falkland Islands Dependencies Survey (FIDS) in 1947, and again in 1955. The name, by the United Kingdom Antarctic Place-Names Committee (UK-APC), is descriptive of the dark brown color of the steep east and south rock faces of the feature.
