= Foyn Point =

Area in Antarctica

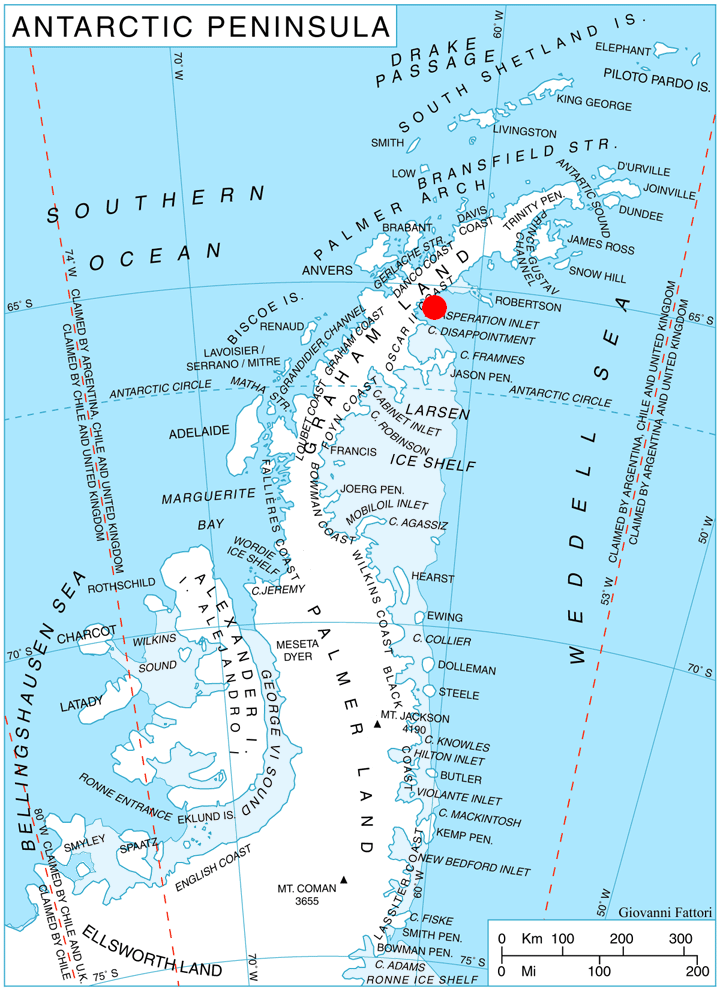
Location of Blagoevgrad Peninsula in Graham Land, Antarctic Peninsula.

Foyn Point (65°15′S 61°38′W) is a point surmounted by a peak 525 metres (1,720 ft) high, forming the southeast extremity of Blagoevgrad Peninsula and marking the north side of the entrance to Exasperation Inlet, on Oscar II Coast on the east side of Graham Land, Antarctica. Sir Hubert Wilkins on a flight of December 20, 1928 photographed what appeared to be an island off the east coast, later charting it in 66°30′S 62°30′W (present Slav Point). Subsequent comparison of Wilkins' photographs of this feature with those taken by the Falkland Islands Dependencies Survey, who charted the coast in 1947, indicate that this point, although considerably north of the position reported by Wilkins, is the feature named by him as "Foyn Island". The name Foyn Point is given to the southeast extremity of this feature. It is named for Svend Foyn.
