= Blagoevgrad Peninsula =

Peninsula in Antarctica

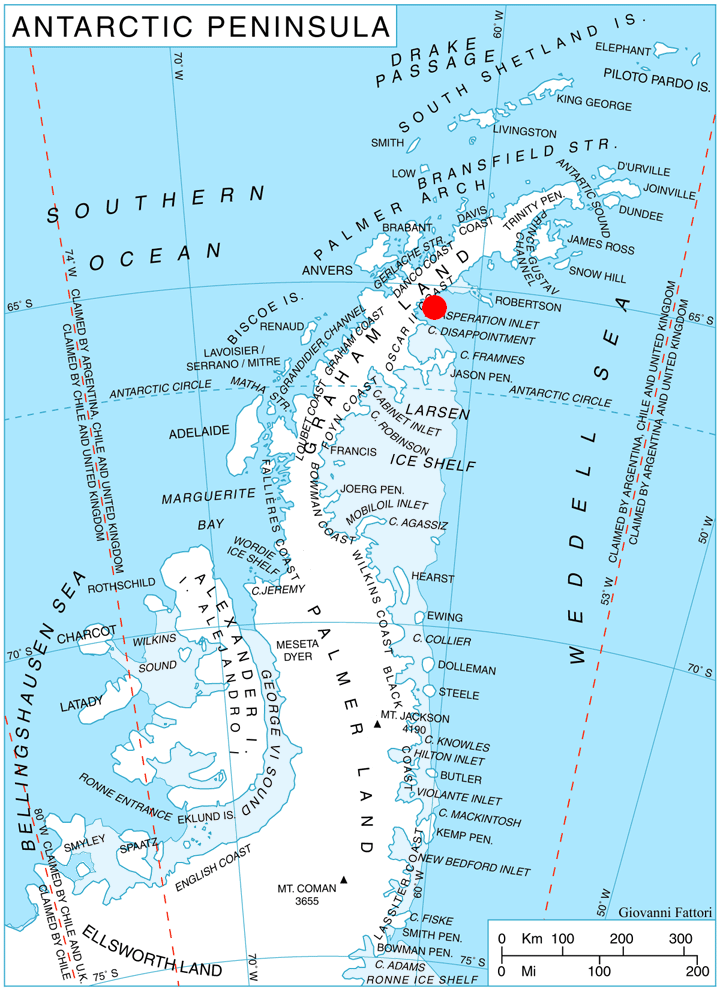
Location of Blagoevgrad Peninsula in Graham Land, Antarctic Peninsula.

Blagoevgrad Peninsula (Bulgarian: полуостров Благоевград, romanized: poluostrov Blagoevgrad, IPA: [poɫuˈɔstrov bɫɐˈɡɔɛvɡrɐt]) is the mostly ice-covered peninsula projecting 15 km in southeast direction from Oscar II Coast in Graham Land, Antarctica, and 17 km wide. It is bounded by Vaughan Inlet to the north and Exasperation Inlet to the south, ending in Foyn Point to the southeast. The east coast of the peninsula is indented by Yamforina Cove, and its interior is partly occupied by the southeast portion of Poibrene Heights. It was formed as a result of the break-up of Larsen Ice Shelf in the area in 2002, and subsequent retreat of the adjacent Evans Glacier and Punchbowl Glacier.

The feature is named after the city of Blagoevgrad in southwestern Bulgaria.

== Location ==
Blagoevgrad Peninsula is located at 65°10′30″S 61°44′00″W. SCAR Antarctic Digital Database mapping in 2012.

== Maps ==
- Antarctic Digital Database (ADD). Scale 1:250000 topographic map of Antarctica. Scientific Committee on Antarctic Research (SCAR), 1993–2016.
