= Poibrene Heights =

Elevated area in Graham Land, Antarctica

Location of Oscar II Coast on Antarctic Peninsula.

Poibrene Heights are the heights rising to 948 m (Dimcha Peak) on Oscar II Coast, Graham Land in Antarctica. They are extending 18 km in northwest-southeast direction and 10 km wide, and surmounting Evans Glacier to the north, Vaughan Inlet to the northeast, the coastal Whiteside Hill to the east, Foyn Point to the southeast, Kunino Point and Exasperation Inlet to the south, and Punchbowl Glacier to the southwest. The heights are separated from Forbidden Plateau by Vishna Pass.

The feature is named after the settlement of Poibrene in southern Bulgaria.

== Location ==
Poibrene Heights are located at 65°09′00″S 61°53′00″W.

== Maps ==
- Antarctic Digital Database (ADD). Scale 1:250000 topographic map of Antarctica. Scientific Committee on Antarctic Research (SCAR). Since 1993, regularly upgraded and updated.
