= Green Glacier =

Glacier in Graham Land, Antarctica

Green Glacier (64°58′S 61°52′W) is a glacier on the east side of Graham Land, Antarctica, 15 nautical miles (28 km) long and 4 nautical miles (7 km) wide, flowing from the plateau northeast between Dugerjav Peak and Rugate Ridge, and then east into Vaughan Inlet next north of Pirne Peak and south of the terminus of Hektoria Glacier.

It was surveyed by the Falkland Islands Dependencies Survey (FIDS) in 1955, and was named by the UK Antarctic Place-Names Committee for John R. Green, FIDS leader at Deception Island in 1950 and at the Argentine Islands in 1951.
