= Punchbowl Glacier =

Glacier in Antarctica

Location of Oscar II Coast on Antarctic Peninsula.

Punchbowl Glacier (65°11′S 61°57′W) is a glacier that flows southwards between Poibrene Heights and Metlichina Ridge, and enters the north end of Exasperation Inlet, north of Jorum Glacier, on the east side of Graham Land, Antarctica.

Surveyed by Falkland Islands Dependencies Survey (FIDS) in 1947 and 1955. The name applied by United Kingdom Antarctic Place-Names Committee (UK-APC) is descriptive of shape as the glacier is hemmed in by mountains.
