= Whiteside Hill =

Antarctic Hill

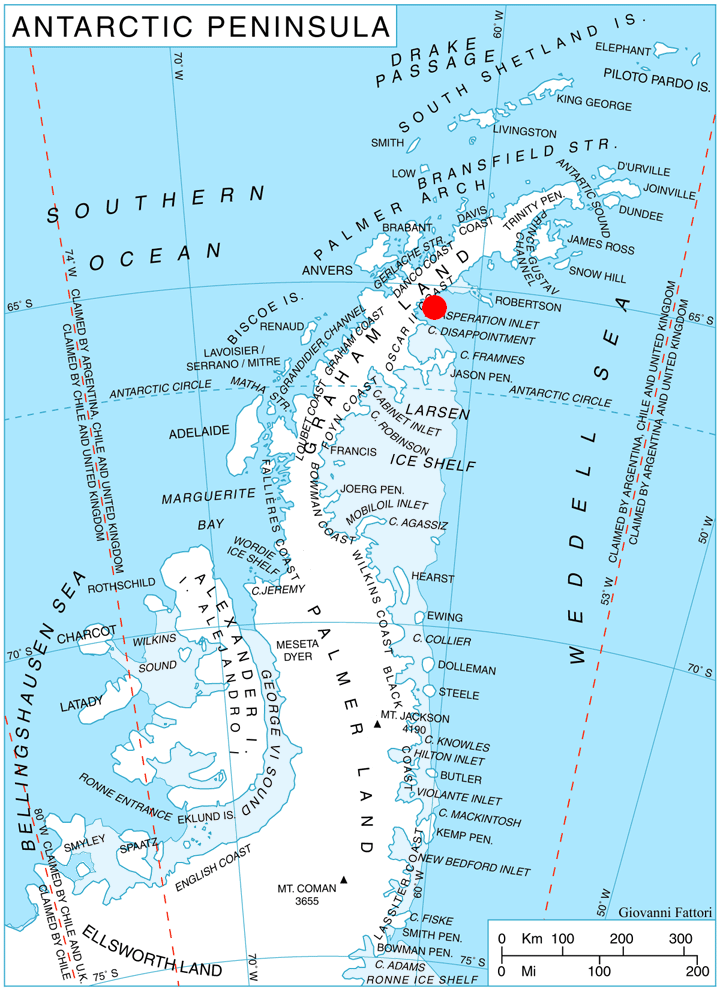
Location of Blagoevgrad Peninsula in Graham Land, Antarctic Peninsula.

Whiteside Hill (65°8′S 61°38′W) is an ice-covered hill rising to 330 m on Blagoevgrad Peninsula on the east coast of Graham Land, Antarctica. An offshoot of the hill ending 3 km to the northeast forms the southwest side of the entrance to Vaughan Inlet. This area was observed from the air by Sir Hubert Wilkins on December 20, 1928. The feature was first charted as a point during 1947 by the Falkland Islands Dependencies Survey (FIDS). In 1955, FIDS reported that the point is not marked by any rock exposures and merges so gradually with the ice of Evans Glacier that the hill is the feature to which the name should be applied. The descriptive name was given by the United Kingdom Antarctic Place-Names Committee (UK-APC).
