= Mount Quandary =

Mountain in Graham Land, Antarctica

Mount Quandary (64°52′S 61°34′W) is a mountain on the east side and near the head of Hektoria Glacier, 12 miles (19 km) northwest of Shiver Point, in Graham Land. Surveyed by Falkland Islands Dependencies Survey (FIDS) in 1955; the name arose because when first viewed it could not be determined whether the feature was part of the central plateau of Graham Land or a detached summit in Hektoria Glacier.
