= Caution Point =

Location of Oscar II Coast on Antarctic Peninsula.

Caution Point (65°16′S 62°1′W) is a headland 4 nautical miles (7 km) northeast of Mount Birks, on the north side of the entrance to Spillane Fjord, which marks the east end of Austa Ridge that forms the north wall of Crane Glacier, on the east coast of Graham Land. It was photographed from the air by Sir Hubert Wilkins on a flight of December 20, 1928, and named by the Falkland Islands Dependencies Survey who charted it in 1947.
