= Vaughan Inlet =

Body of water in Graham Land, Antarctica

Location of Oscar II Coast on Antarctic Peninsula.

Vaughan Inlet (65°02′15″S 61°36′00″W) is an inlet approximately 10 miles (16 km) long and 7.2 miles (11.6 km) wide between the coastal point formed by Whiteside Hill to the southwest and Shiver Point to the northeast, on Oscar II Coast in Graham Land, Antarctica. Its head is fed by Evans Glacier, Green Glacier, Hektoria Glacier and Brenitsa Glacier.

The inlet coincides with the southeast part of the ice-covered feature photographed from the air by Sir Hubert Wilkins, December 20, 1928, to which he applied the name "Hektoria Fiords" after the whaling factory ship Hektoria, which transported his expedition to Deception Island. The nature of the feature was altered, revealing open water, by the retreat of the lower parts of Hektoria, Green and Evans Glaciers, which followed the calving of the Larsen Ice Shelf in the area in March 2002.

The inlet was named by UK-APC in 2008 after David G. Vaughan, Honorary Professor of Geography, Swansea University; BAS Principal Investigator 1999–2008; BAS glaciologist, 1986–99, who has been in the forefront of investigations into the movement and break-up of the Antarctic ice sheet.

== Maps ==
- Antarctic Digital Database (ADD). Scale 1:250000 topographic map of Antarctica. Scientific Committee on Antarctic Research (SCAR), 1993–2016.
