= Hektoria Glacier =

Glacier in Graham Land, Antarctica

Location of Oscar II Coast on Antarctic Peninsula.

Hektoria Glacier (65°3′S 61°31′W) is a glacier flowing south from the area around Mount Johnston between Mount Quandary and Zagreus Ridge into Vaughan Inlet next west of Brenitsa Glacier and east of Green Glacier, on the east coast of the Antarctic Peninsula.

The name "Hektoria Fiords" was given by Sir Hubert Wilkins during his flight of 20 December 1928, after the SS Hektoria, which had brought him to Deception Island. Following survey by the Falkland Islands Dependencies Survey (FIDS) in 1947, the feature could not be identified; however, during further survey by FIDS in 1955, Wilkins' "long ice-filled fiords" were found to be this glacier and two short unnamed ones.

Between early 2022 and mid 2023, the glacier retreated 25 km in 15 months, including 8 km in just two months in November and December 2022, by a factor of ten the fastest rate of glacier collapse ever observed.
