= Evans Glacier (Graham Land) =

Glacier in Antarctica

Location of Oscar II Coast on Antarctic Peninsula.

Evans Glacier (65°5′S 61°40′W) is a gently-sloping glacier 15 nautical miles (28 km) long and 4 nautical miles (7 km) wide, draining the southeast slopes of Travnik Buttress eastwards between Rugate Ridge and Poibrene Heights to flow into Vaughan Inlet on the east coast of Graham Land, Antarctica. It was discovered by Sir Hubert Wilkins in an aerial flight, December 20, 1928, and named "Evans Inlet" by him for E.S. Evans of Detroit. A further survey by the Falkland Islands Dependencies Survey in 1955 reported that this low-lying area is not an inlet, but is formed by the lower reaches of Hektoria Glacier and the feature now described.
