= Jorum Glacier =

Glacier in Antarctica

Coordinates: 65°14′S 62°3′W

Location of Oscar II Coast on Antarctic Peninsula.

Jorum Glacier is a glacier draining the southeast slopes of Forbidden Plateau, and flowing east into Exasperation Inlet, just north of Caution Point, on the east coast of Graham Land, Antarctica. It was surveyed by the Falkland Islands Dependencies Survey in 1947 and 1955. The UK Antarctic Place-Names Committee name alludes to the punchbowl shape of the head of the glacier, a "jorum" being a large drinking bowl used for punch.
