= Exasperation Inlet =

Inlet on the east coast of Graham Land, Antarctic

Coordinates: 65°20′S 62°0′W

Exasperation Inlet is a large ice-filled inlet, 16 miles (26 km) wide at its entrance between Foyn Point and Cape Disappointment, on the east coast of Graham Land. It was charted in 1947 by the Falkland Islands Dependencies Survey, who so named it because the disturbed nature of the ice in the vicinity caused considerable difficulty to sledging parties.
