= Forbidden Plateau (Antarctica) =

Plateau in Antarctica

The Forbidden Plateau (64°47′S 62°05′W) is a long, narrow plateau extending southwestward from Charlotte Bay to Flandres Bay in Graham Land. It borders Bruce Plateau on the south and Foster Plateau on the north. The feature was mapped by the Falkland Islands Dependencies Survey (FIDS) from photos taken by Hunting Aerosurveys Ltd. in 1956–57. Its name was picked by the UK Antarctic Place-names Committee (UK-APC) because all attempts to reach the plateau failed until it was finally traversed by Falkland Islands Dependencies Survey (FIDS) members in 1957.

== See also ==
- Blue Icefalls
