= Oscar II Coast =

Coast in Graham Land, Antarctica

Coordinates: 65°45′S 62°30′W

Location of Oscar II Coast on Antarctic Peninsula.

Oscar II Coast is that portion of the east coast of the Antarctic Peninsula between Cape Fairweather to the north, and Cape Alexander to the south. Discovered in 1893 by Captain C.A. Larsen, who named it for King Oscar II of Norway and Sweden. To the north of this coast is Nordenskjöld Coast.
