= Bulgarian toponyms in Antarctica (R) =

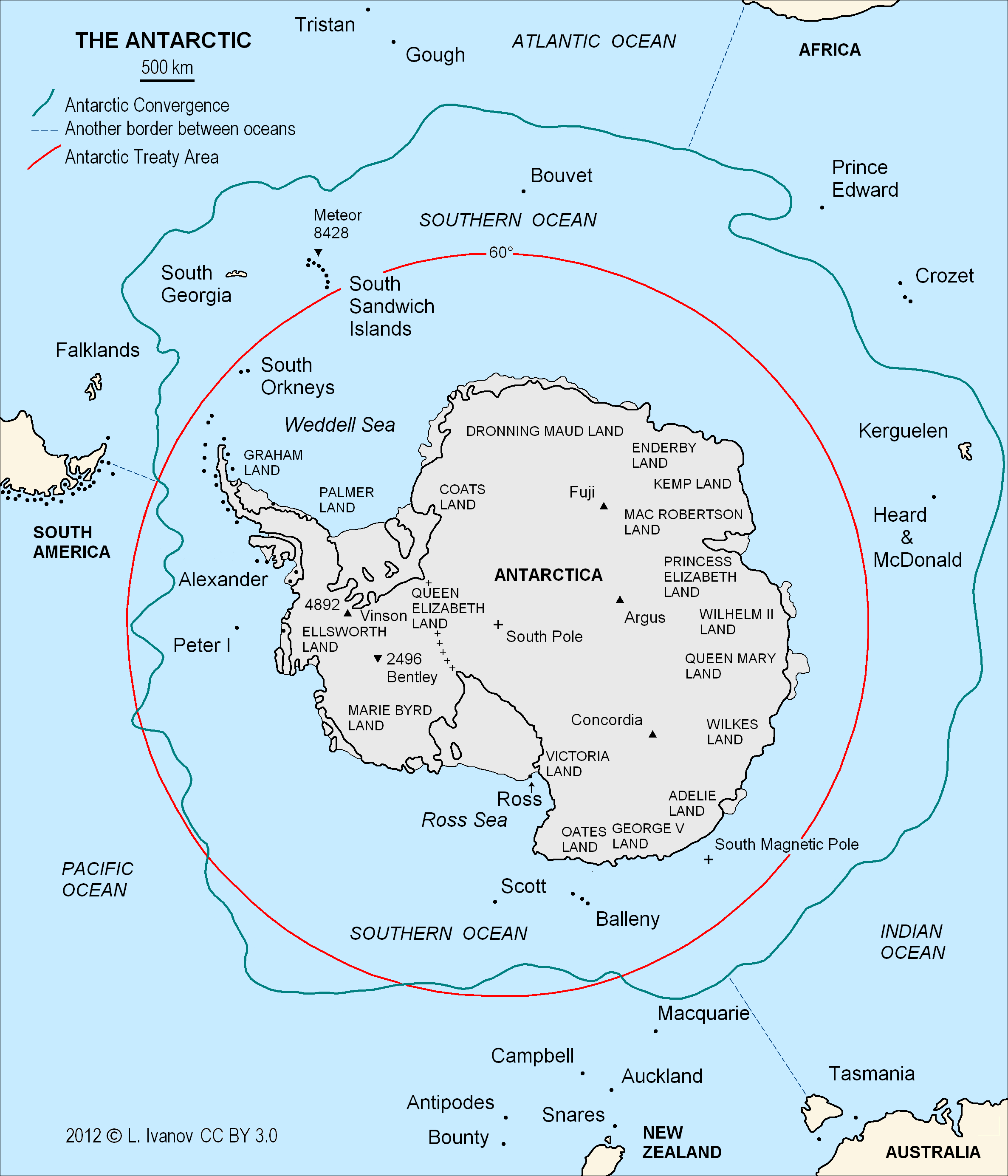
The South Polar Region.

- Rabisha Rocks, Greenwich Island
- Rachenitsa Nunatak, Alexander Island
- Radev Point, Rugged Island
- Radibosh Point, Davis Coast
- Radichkov Peak, Livingston Island
- Radko Knoll, Livingston Island
- Radnevo Peak, Livingston Island
- Radomir Knoll, Livingston Island
- Mount Radotina, Graham Coast
- Radovene Point, Oscar II Coast
- Radoy Ralin Peak, Livingston Island
- Raduil Point, Astrolabe Island
- Rak Island, Wilhelm Archipelago
- Raketa Island, Wilhelm Archipelago
- Raklitsa Island, Liège Island
- Rakovski Nunatak, Livingston Island
- Ralida Island, Trinity Island
- Ralitsa Glacier, Brabant Island
- Ramsden Rock, Livingston Island
- Ranuli Ice Piedmont, Sentinel Range
- Ranyari Point, Oscar II Coast
- Raskuporis Cove, Livingston Island
- Rasnik Peak, Graham Coast
- Ravda Peak, Livingston Island
- Raven Peninsula, Nordenskjöld Coast
- Ravnogor Peak, Oscar II Coast
- Ravulya Nunatak, Sentinel Range
- Rayko Nunatak, Trinity Peninsula
- Rayna Knyaginya Peak, Livingston Island
- Razboyna Glacier, Sentinel Range
- Razdel Point, Smith Island
- Razgrad Peak, Greenwich Island
- Razhana Buttress, Danco Coast
- Razlog Cove, Greenwich Island
- Razvigor Peak, Trinity Peninsula
- Rebrovo Point, Snow Island
- Redina Island, Robert Island
- Regianum Peak, Brabant Island
- Relyovo Peninsula, Danco Coast
- Remetalk Point, Livingston Island
- Reselets Peak, Oscar II Coast
- Retamales Point, Nelson Island
- Retizhe Cove, Trinity Peninsula
- Revolver Island, Wilhelm Archipelago
- Rezen Knoll, Livingston Island
- Rezen Saddle, Livingston Island
- Rezovski Creek, Livingston Island
- Rhesus Glacier, Anvers Island
- Ribnik Island, Biscoe Islands
- Riggs Peak, Smith Island
- Riksa Islands, Aitcho Islands
- Rila Point, Livingston Island
- Rilets Peak, Oscar II Coast
- Rish Point, Livingston Island
- Risimina Glacier, Nordenskjöld Coast
- Ritchie Rock, Snow Island
- Ritli Hill, Livingston Island
- Ritya Glacier, Smith Island
- Robinson Pass, Sentinel Range
- Roché Glacier, Vinson Massif
- Rodopi Peak, Livingston Island
- Rog Island, Wilhelm Archipelago
- Rogach Peak, Astrolabe Island
- Rogosh Glacier, Oscar II Coast
- Rogozen Island, Robert Island
- Rogulyat Island, Trinity Island
- Roman Knoll, Trinity Peninsula
- Ronalds Point, Elephant Island
- Rongel Point, Livingston Island
- Rongel Reef, Livingston Island
- Ropotamo Glacier, Livingston Island
- Rose Valley Glacier, Livingston Island
- Rotalia Island, Nelson Island
- Royak Point, Trinity Peninsula
- Roygos Ridge, Graham Coast
- Rozhen Peninsula, Livingston Island
- Rudozem Heights, Fallières Coast
- Ruen Icefall, Livingston Island
- Rumyana Glacier, Sentinel Range
- Rupite Glacier, Smith Island
- Rusalka Glacier, Graham Coast
- Ruse Peak, Livingston Island
- Ruset Peak, Sentinel Range
- Rusokastro Rock, Greenwich Island

== See also ==
- Bulgarian toponyms in Antarctica

== Bibliography ==
- J. Stewart. Antarctica: An Encyclopedia. Jefferson, N.C. and London: McFarland, 2011. 1771 pp. ISBN 978-0-7864-3590-6
- L. Ivanov. Bulgarian Names in Antarctica. Sofia: Manfred Wörner Foundation, 2021. Second edition. 539 pp. ISBN 978-619-90008-5-4 (in Bulgarian)
- G. Bakardzhieva. Bulgarian toponyms in Antarctica. Paisiy Hilendarski University of Plovdiv: Research Papers. Vol. 56, Book 1, Part A, 2018 – Languages and Literature, pp. 104-119 (in Bulgarian)
- L. Ivanov and N. Ivanova. Bulgarian names. In: The World of Antarctica. Generis Publishing, 2022. pp. 114-115. ISBN 979-8-88676-403-1
