= Fartuni Nunatak =

Nunatak in Graham Land, Antarctica

Location of Oscar II Coast on Antarctic Peninsula.

Fartuni Nunatak (Bulgarian: нунатак Фъртуни, ‘Nunatak Fartuni’ \'nu-na-tak f&r-'tu-ni\) is the narrow, rocky ridge extending 1.6 km in northwest-southeast direction, and rising to 927 m in Ivanili Heights on Oscar II Coast in Graham Land. It is situated in the northwest part of Rogosh Glacier. The feature is named after the settlement of Fartuni in Northern Bulgaria.

== Location ==
Fartuni Nunatak is located at 64°52′42″S 61°21′32″W, which is 3.25 km east-southeast of Manastir Peak, 3.1 km south of Stargel Peak, and 6.25 km west-northwest of Dymcoff Crag in Lovech Heights. British mapping in 1978.

== Maps ==
- British Antarctic Territory. Scale 1:200000 topographic map. DOS 610 Series, Sheet W 64 60. Directorate of Overseas Surveys, Tolworth, UK, 1978.
- Antarctic Digital Database (ADD). Scale 1:250000 topographic map of Antarctica. Scientific Committee on Antarctic Research (SCAR). Since 1993, regularly upgraded and updated.
