= Mount Moriya =

Mountain in Graham Land, Antarctica

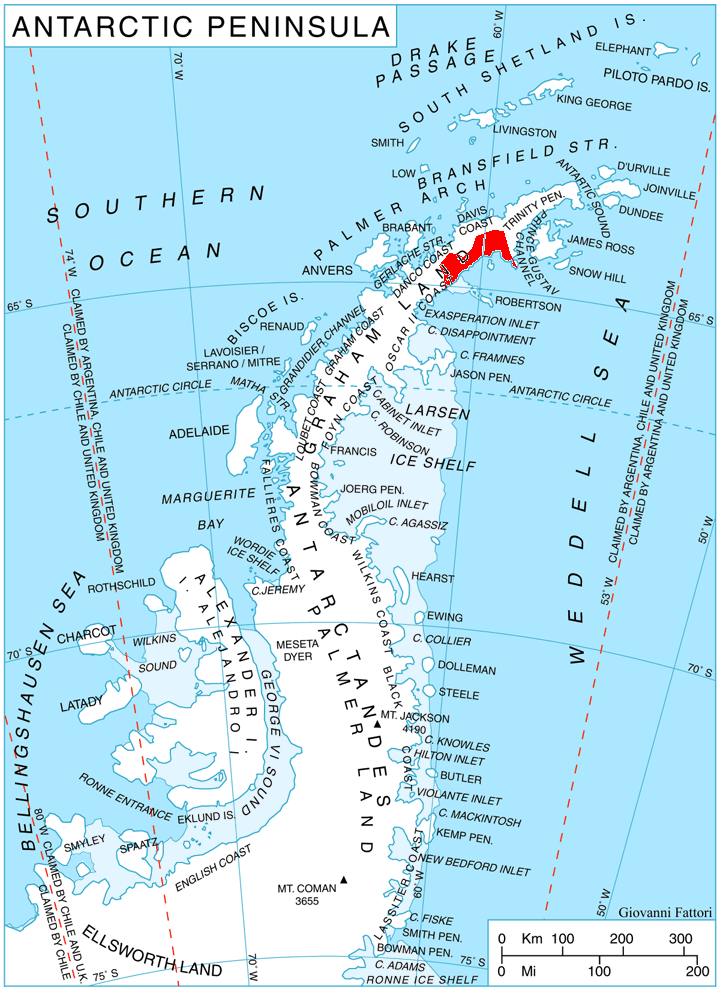
Location of Nordenskjöld Coast.

Mount Moriya (Bulgarian: връх Мория, romanized: vrah Moriya, IPA: [ˈvrɤx moˈrijɐ]) is the rounded, ice-covered peak rising to 1634 m in Lovech Heights on Nordenskjöld Coast in Graham Land, Antarctica. It is surmounting Rogosh Glacier to the south and northwest, Zlokuchene Glacier to the east-northeast, and Risimina Glacier to the southeast.

The feature is named after the medieval fortress of Moriya in western Bulgaria.

== Location ==
Mount Moriya is located at 64°51′46″S 61°07′47″W, which is 1.9 km south of Mrahori Saddle, 14.2 km southwest of Tillberg Peak, 15.1 km north-northwest of the ridge forming Cape Fairweather, and 3.17 km east-northeast of Mount Persenk. British mapping in 1978.

== Maps ==
- Antarctic Digital Database (ADD). Scale 1:250000 topographic map of Antarctica. Scientific Committee on Antarctic Research (SCAR). Since 1993, regularly upgraded and updated.
