= Manastir (disambiguation) =

Manastir (Bitola) is a city in the southwestern part of North Macedonia.

Manastir may also refer to:

== Places ==
- Manastir, Haskovo Province, Bulgaria
- Manastir, Plovdiv Province, Bulgaria
- Manastir (Prilep), a village near Prilep, North Macedonia
- Manastir, Niš, village near Niš, Serbia
- Beli Manastir, a town and municipality in eastern Croatia

== Other ==
- Manastır Mosque, Istanbul, a former Eastern Orthodox church converted into a mosque by the Ottomans
- Manastir Peak, a peak on the Antarctic Peninsula that was named after Manastir, Haskovo Province
- Manastır Türküsü, Turkish song
- Manastir Vilayet, a first-level administrative division (vilayet) of the Ottoman Empire

== See also ==
- Monastir (disambiguation)
