= Bulgarian toponyms in Antarctica (F) =

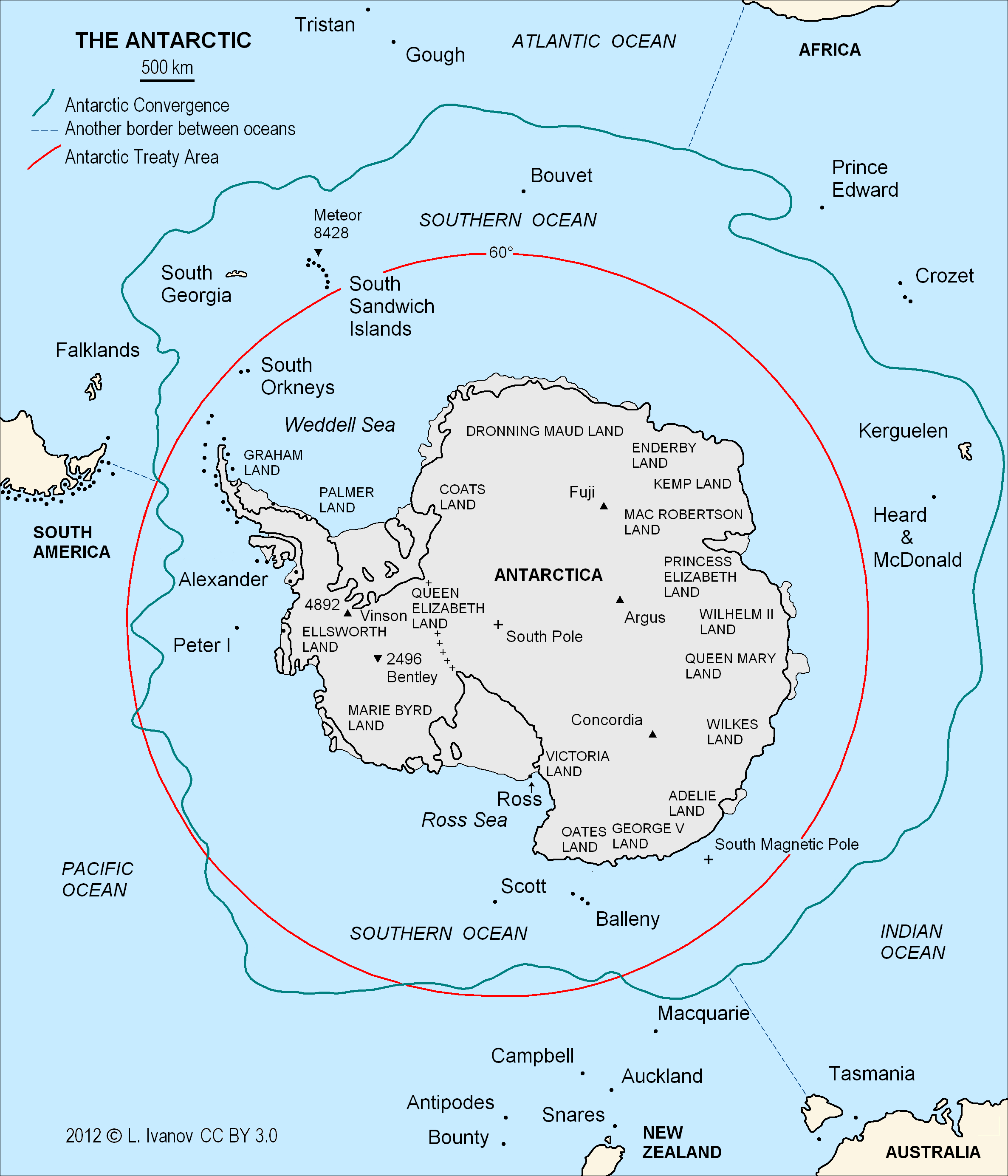
The South Polar Region.

- Farmakida Cove, Alexander Island
- Fartuni Nunatak, Oscar II Coast
- Feniks Island, Trinity Island
- Feya Tarn, Livingston Island
- Ficheto Point, Livingston Island
- Filip Totyu Nunatak, Oscar II Coast
- Finaeus Cove, Graham Coast
- Mount Fisek, Bastien Range
- Fizalia Island, Trinity Island
- Flamingo Beach, Greenwich Island
- Fletcher Nunatak, Livingston Island
- Fonfon Glacier, Sentinel Range
- Foros Spur, Sentinel Range
- Fontus Lake, Livingston Island
- Fregata Island, Nelson Island
- Friesland Ridge, Livingston Island
- Frisius Point, Nelson Island
- Frolosh Point, Anvers Island
- Fruzhin Peak, Sentinel Range
- Fucha Peak, Sentinel Range
- Furen Point, Oscar II Coast

== See also ==
- Bulgarian toponyms in Antarctica

== Bibliography ==
- J. Stewart. Antarctica: An Encyclopedia. Jefferson, N.C. and London: McFarland, 2011. 1771 pp. ISBN 978-0-7864-3590-6
- L. Ivanov. Bulgarian Names in Antarctica. Sofia: Manfred Wörner Foundation, 2021. Second edition. 539 pp. ISBN 978-619-90008-5-4 (in Bulgarian)
- G. Bakardzhieva. Bulgarian toponyms in Antarctica. Paisiy Hilendarski University of Plovdiv: Research Papers. Vol. 56, Book 1, Part A, 2018 – Languages and Literature, pp. 104-119 (in Bulgarian)
- L. Ivanov and N. Ivanova. Bulgarian names. In: The World of Antarctica. Generis Publishing, 2022. pp. 114-115. ISBN 979-8-88676-403-1
