= Dymcoff Crag =

Location of Oscar II Coast on Antarctic Peninsula.

Dymcoff Crag (Bulgarian: Димков камък, ‘Dymcoff Kamak’ \'dim-kov 'ka-m&k\) is the rocky, partly ice-free peak rising to 1360 m in Lovech Heights on Nordenskjöld Coast in Graham Land. It surmounts Rogosh Glacier to the west and south. The feature is named after the Bulgarian engineer Nicolas Dymcoff (1861–1937), whose project ‘Étoile de la Concorde’ published in 1917 envisaged the establishment of a world organization for the preservation of peace and fostering cooperation among nations.

== Location ==
Dymcoff Crag is located at 64°54′02″S 61°14′16″W, which is 4 km southwest of Mount Persenk, 8.15 km north of Skilly Peak, and 6.9 km east of Kumanovo Peak in Ivanili Heights. British mapping in 1978.

== Maps ==
- British Antarctic Territory. Scale 1:200000 topographic map. DOS 610 Series, Sheet W 64 60. Directorate of Overseas Surveys, Tolworth, UK, 1978.
- Antarctic Digital Database (ADD). Scale 1:250000 topographic map of Antarctica. Scientific Committee on Antarctic Research (SCAR). Since 1993, regularly upgraded and updated.
