= Kumanovo Peak =

Mountain in Antarctica

Location of Oscar II Coast on Antarctic Peninsula.

Kumanovo Peak (Bulgarian: връх Куманово, romanized: vrah Kumanovo, IPA: [ˈvrɤx koˈmanovo]) is the rocky, partly ice-free peak rising to 1002 m in Ivanili Heights on Oscar II Coast in Graham Land. It surmounts Rogosh Glacier to the northeast and east. The feature is named after the settlement of Kumanovo in Northeastern Bulgaria.

== Location ==
Kumanovo Peak is located at 64°54′29″S 61°22′58″W, which is 5 km south-southeast of Manastir Peak, 6.9 km west of Dymcoff Crag in Lovech Heights, 8.7 km northwest of Skilly Peak, and 10.45 km southeast of Mount Quandary. British mapping in 1978.

== Maps ==
- British Antarctic Territory. Scale 1:200000 topographic map. DOS 610 Series, Sheet W 64 60. Directorate of Overseas Surveys, Tolworth, UK, 1978.
- Antarctic Digital Database (ADD). Scale 1:250000 topographic map of Antarctica. Scientific Committee on Antarctic Research (SCAR), 1993–2016.
