= Eduard Nunatak =

Antarctic nunatak

Location of Oscar II Coast on Antarctic Peninsula

Eduard Nunatak (Bulgarian: нунатак Едуард, romanized: Nunatak Eduard, IPA: [ˈnunɐtak ˈɛduɐrt]) is the rocky ridge 2.32 km long in northwest–southeast direction and 1.14 km wide, rising to 683 m on Oscar II Coast in Graham Land, Antarctica. It surmounts Artanes Bay on the east and Vaughan Inlet on the west.

The feature is named after Roman Eduard, boatman at St. Kliment Ohridski base during the 2010/11 and subsequent Bulgarian Antarctic campaigns.

== Location ==
Eduard Nunatak is located at 65°00′47″S 61°21′08″W, which is 4.6 km northeast of Shiver Point, 8 km east-southeast of Mural Nunatak, 5.7 km southwest of Skilly Peak and 12.5 km west-northwest of Cape Fairweather.

== Maps ==
- Antarctic Digital Database (ADD). Scale 1:250000 topographic map of Antarctica. Scientific Committee on Antarctic Research (SCAR). Since 1993, regularly upgraded and updated
