= Tashukov Nunatak =

Antarctic nunatak

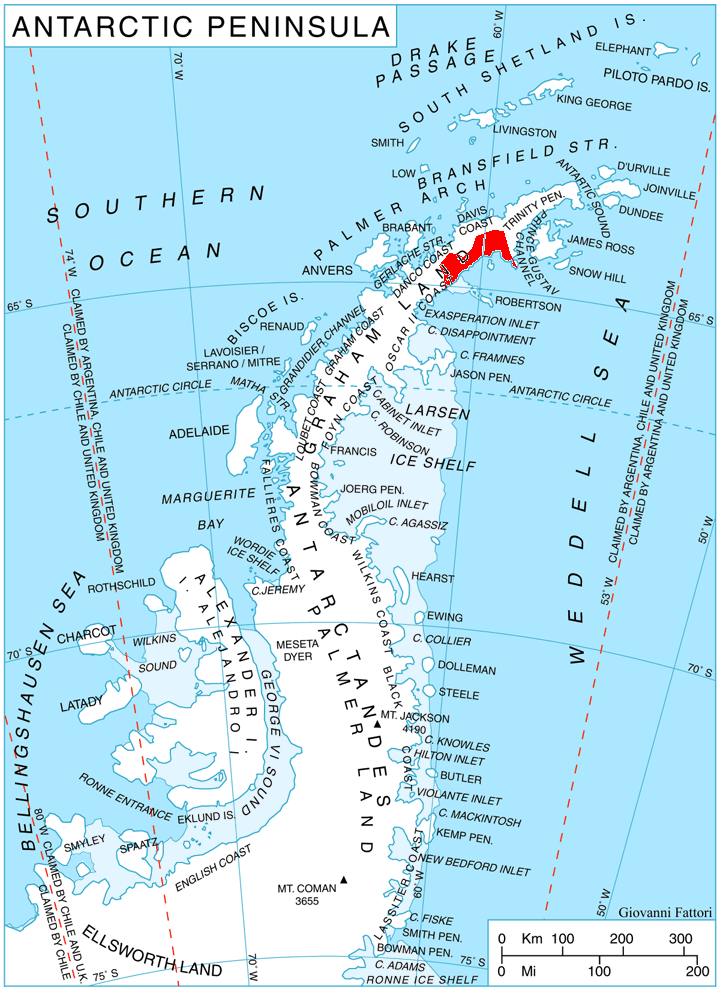
Location of Nordenskjöld Coast on Antarctic Peninsula

Tashukov Nunatak (Bulgarian: Ташуков нунатак, romanized: Tashukov nunatak, IPA: [tɐˈʃukof ˈnunɐtak]) is the rocky ridge 1.8 km long in northwest–southeast direction and 1.7 km wide, rising to 768 m on the northeast side of Zlokuchene Glacier on Nordenskjöld Coast in Graham Land, Antarctica.

The feature is named after Ivan Tashukov, engineer at St. Kliment Ohridski base during the 1994/95 Bulgarian Antarctic campaign, which set the longterm directions of the Bulgarian Antarctic research.

== Location ==
Tashukov Nunatak is located at 64°50′02″S 60°52′14″W, which is 9.8 km southwest of Balvan Point, 12 km northwest of Pedersen Nunatak, 8.1 km east of Andersson Peak and 6.3 km south of Tillberg Peak. British mapping in 1978.

== Maps ==
- British Antarctic Territory. Scale 1:200000 topographic map. DOS 610 Series, Sheet W 64 60. Directorate of Overseas Surveys, UK, 1978
- Antarctic Digital Database (ADD). Scale 1:250000 topographic map of Antarctica. Scientific Committee on Antarctic Research (SCAR). Since 1993, regularly upgraded and updated
