= Okorsh Saddle =

Location of Oscar II Coast on Antarctic Peninsula.

Okorsh Saddle (Bulgarian: седловина Окорш, ‘Sedlovina Okorsh’ \se-dlo-vi-'na o-'korsh\) is the rocky saddle of elevation 1133 m on Oscar II Coast in Graham Land linking Foster Plateau to the north to Ivanili Heights to the south. It is part of the glacial divide between Brenitsa Glacier and Rogosh Glacier. The feature is named after the settlement of Okorsh in Northeastern Bulgaria.

== Location ==
Okorsh Saddle is located at 64°50′32″S 61°22′18″W, which is 11.45 km west of Mrahori Saddle, 1 km north of Stargel Peak, and 10 km east-northeast of Mount Quandary. British mapping in 1978.

== Maps ==
- British Antarctic Territory. Scale 1:200000 topographic map. DOS 610 Series, Sheet W 64 60. Directorate of Overseas Surveys, Tolworth, UK, 1978.
- Antarctic Digital Database (ADD). Scale 1:250000 topographic map of Antarctica. Scientific Committee on Antarctic Research (SCAR). Since 1993, regularly upgraded and updated.
