= Stargel Peak =

Mountain in Antarctica

Location of Oscar II Coast on Antarctic Peninsula.

Stargel Peak (Bulgarian: връх Стъргел, romanized: vrah Stargel, IPA: [ˈvrɤx ˈstɤrɡɛɫ]) is the sharp rocky peak rising to 1434 m at the north extremity of Ivanili Heights on Oscar II Coast in Graham Land, Antarctica. It is linked by Okorsh Saddle to Foster Plateau to the north, and surmounts Brenitsa Glacier to the west and Rogosh Glacier to the east. The feature is named after the settlement of Stargel in Western Bulgaria.

== Location ==
Stargel Peak is located at 64°51′04″S 61°22′09″W, which is 8.55 km west-northwest of Mount Persenk in Lovech Heights, 14.15 km north-northwest of Skilly Peak, and 9.95 km east of Mount Quandary. British mapping in 1978.

== Maps ==
- British Antarctic Territory. Scale 1:200000 topographic map. DOS 610 Series, Sheet W 64 60. Directorate of Overseas Surveys, Tolworth, UK, 1978.
- Antarctic Digital Database (ADD). Scale 1:250000 topographic map of Antarctica. Scientific Committee on Antarctic Research (SCAR). Since 1993, regularly upgraded and updated.
