= Mount Persenk =

Mountain in Graham Land, Antarctica

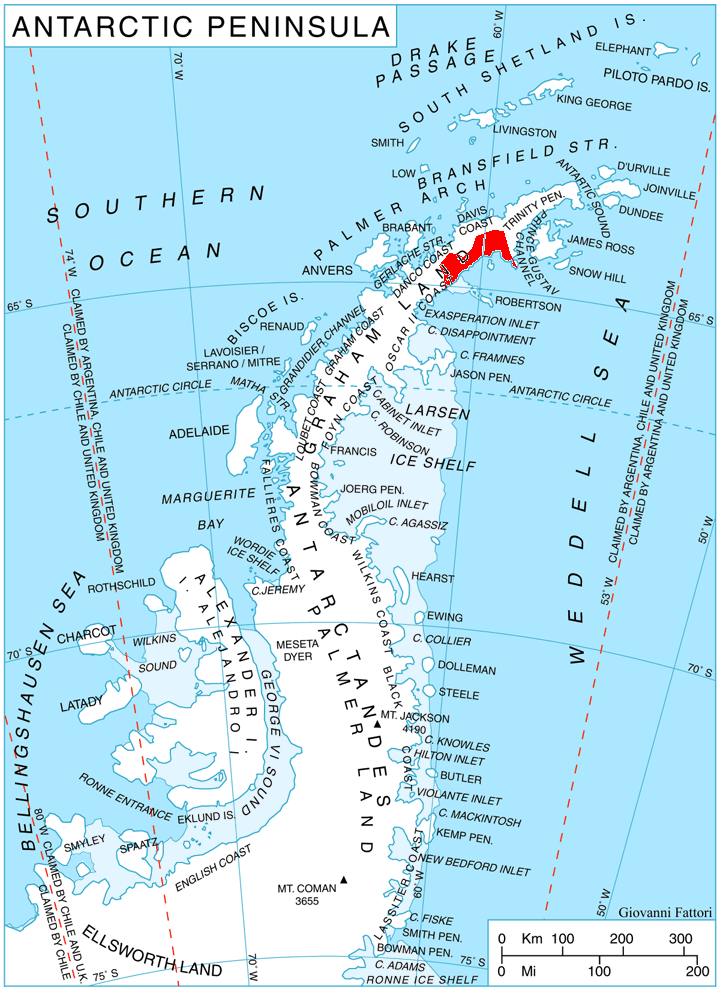
Location of Nordenskjöld Coast.

Mount Persenk (Bulgarian: връх Персенк, romanized: vrah Persenk, IPA: [ˈvrɤx pɛrˈsɛŋk]) is the rounded, ice-covered peak rising to 1603 m in Lovech Heights on Nordenskjöld Coast in Graham Land, Antarctica. It is surmounting Rogosh Glacier to the north, west and south.

The feature is named after Persenk Peak in the Rhodope Mountains, Bulgaria.

== Location ==
Mount Persenk is located at 64°52′12″S 61°11′40″W, which is 15.3 km northwest of the ridge forming Cape Fairweather, 12 km north-northeast of Skilly Peak, 18.15 km east of Mount Quandary, and 3.17 km west-southwest of Mount Moriya. British mapping in 1978.

== Maps ==
- Antarctic Digital Database (ADD). Scale 1:250000 topographic map of Antarctica. Scientific Committee on Antarctic Research (SCAR). Since 1993, regularly upgraded and updated.
