= Reselets Peak =

Mountain in Antarctica

Location of Oscar II Coast on Antarctic Peninsula.

Reselets Peak (Bulgarian: връх Реселец, romanized: vrah Reselets, IPA: [ˈvrɤx rɛsɛˈlɛt͡s]) is the rocky, partly ice-free peak rising to 922 m on Oscar II Coast in Graham Land, and surmounting Brenitsa Glacier to the northwest. The feature is named after the settlement of Reselets in Northern Bulgaria.

== Location ==
Reselets Peak is located at 64°55′23″S 61°27′58″W, which is 4.3 km west-southwest of Kumanovo Peak in Ivanili Heights, 7.55 km north-northeast of Mural Nunatak, and 8.45 km southeast of Mount Quandary. British mapping in 1978.

== Maps ==
- British Antarctic Territory. Scale 1:200000 topographic map. DOS 610 Series, Sheet W 64 60. Directorate of Overseas Surveys, Tolworth, UK, 1978.
- Antarctic Digital Database (ADD). Scale 1:250000 topographic map of Antarctica. Scientific Committee on Antarctic Research (SCAR). Since 1993, regularly upgraded and updated.
