= Manastir Peak =

Rocky peak in Graham Land, Antarctica

Location of Oscar II Coast on Antarctic Peninsula.

Manastir Peak (Bulgarian: връх Манастир, romanized: vrah Manastir, IPA: [ˈvrɤx mɐnɐˈstir]) is a rocky peak rising to 1,340 m (4,400 ft) in Ivanili Heights on Oscar II Coast in Graham Land, Antarctica. It surmounts Brenitsa Glacier to the north and west, and Rogosh Glacier to the southeast. The feature is named after the settlement of Manastir in Southern Bulgaria.

== Location ==
Manastir Peak is located at 64°51′57″S 61°25′14″W, which is 2.94 km (1.83 mi) southwest of Stargel Peak, 9.5 km (5.9 mi) west-northwest of Dymcoff Crag in Lovech Heights, and 7.4 km (4.6 mi) east of Mount Quandary. British mapping in 1978.

== Maps ==
- British Antarctic Territory. Scale 1:200000 topographic map. DOS 610 Series, Sheet W 64 60. Directorate of Overseas Surveys, Tolworth, UK, 1978.
- Antarctic Digital Database (ADD). Scale 1:250000 topographic map of Antarctica. Scientific Committee on Antarctic Research (SCAR). Since 1993, regularly upgraded and updated.
