= Risimina Glacier =

Glacier in Antarctica

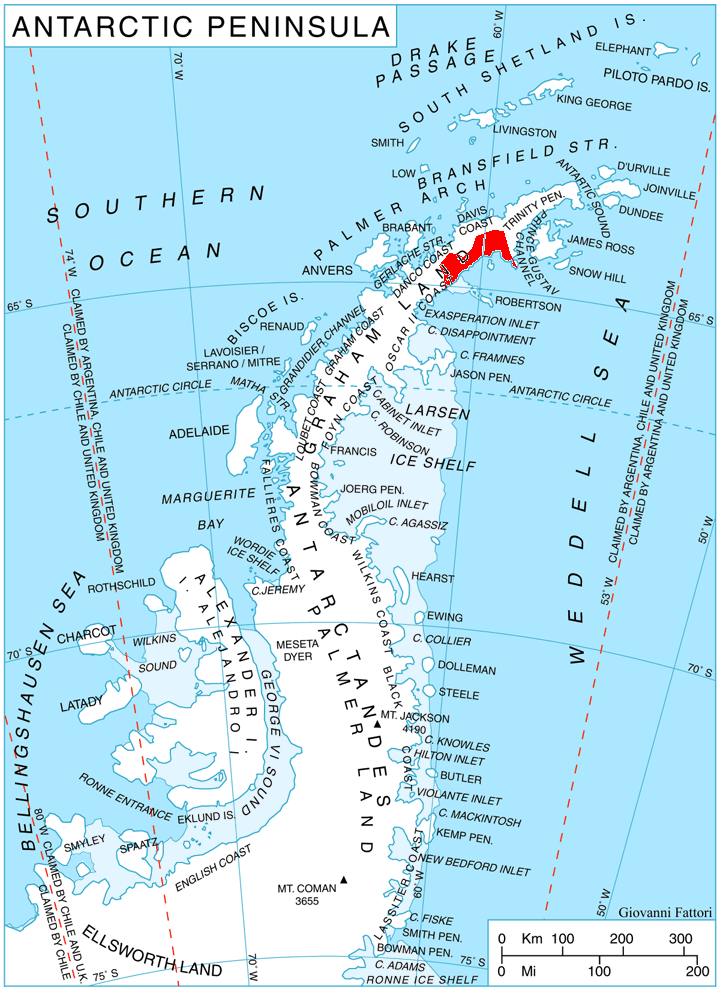
Location of Nordenskjöld Coast.

Risimina Glacier (Bulgarian: ледник Рисимина, romanized: lednik Risimina, IPA: [ˈlɛdnik risiˈminɐ]) is the 10 km long and 4.5 km wide glacier in Lovech Heights on Nordenskjöld Coast in Graham Land, Antarctica situated south of Zlokuchene Glacier and north of the lower course of Rogosh Glacier. It is draining the southeast slopes of Mount Moriya, and flowing east-southeastwards to enter Weddell Sea west of Pedersen Nunatak.

The feature is named after Risimina Cave in northwestern Bulgaria.

== Location ==
Risimina Glacier is located at 64°53′40″S 61°00′00″W. British mapping in 1978.

== Maps ==
- Antarctic Digital Database (ADD). Scale 1:250000 topographic map of Antarctica. Scientific Committee on Antarctic Research (SCAR). Since 1993, regularly upgraded and updated.
