= Skilly =

Skilly may refer to:

== Places ==
- Skilly Hills, South Australia, Australia
- Skilly Peak, Graham Land, Antarctica

== Other uses ==
- Reginald Skilly Williams (1890-1959), English footballer
- Skida "Skilly" Thibodeau, a main villain in Prince of Sparta, a science fiction novel by Jerry Pournelle and S. M. Stirling
- Skully (game), a children's game also released in 2006 as Skilly
- Skilly (food), a broth made from oatmeal and water
- Skilly (mythology), a malevolent creature in Cherokee mythology
- Skilly, (training), the act of practising a skill
