= Mrahori Saddle =

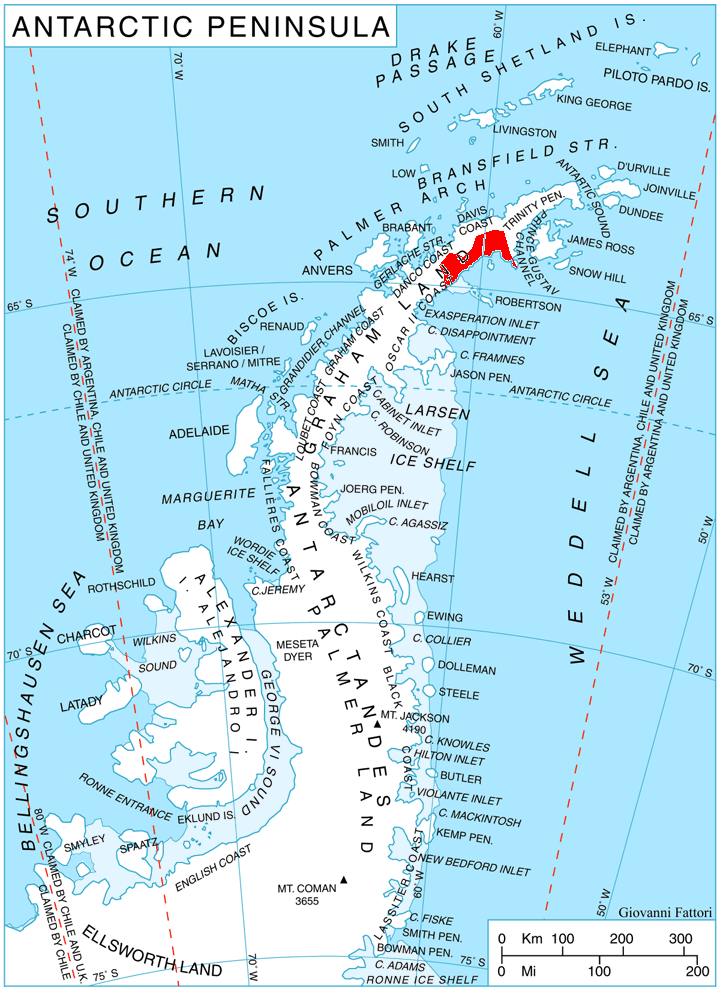
Location of Nordenskjöld Coast.

Mrahori Saddle (Bulgarian: седловина Мрахори, ‘Sedlovina Mrahori’ \se-dlo-vi-'na mra-'ho-ri\) is the ice-covered saddle of elevation 1102 m on Nordenskjöld Coast in Graham Land, Antarctica linking Kyustendil Ridge to the north to Lovech Heights to the south. It is part of the glacial divide between Rogosh Glacier and Zlokuchene Glacier.

The feature is named after the settlement of Mrahori in northern Bulgaria.

== Location ==
Mrahori Saddle is located at 64°50′45″S 61°07′50″W, which is 1.9 km north of Mount Moriya, 21.18 km east of Mount Quandary, and 14.2 km southwest of Tillberg Peak. British mapping in 1978.

== Maps ==
- Antarctic Digital Database (ADD). Scale 1:250000 topographic map of Antarctica. Scientific Committee on Antarctic Research (SCAR). Since 1993, regularly upgraded and updated.
