= Kyustendil Ridge =

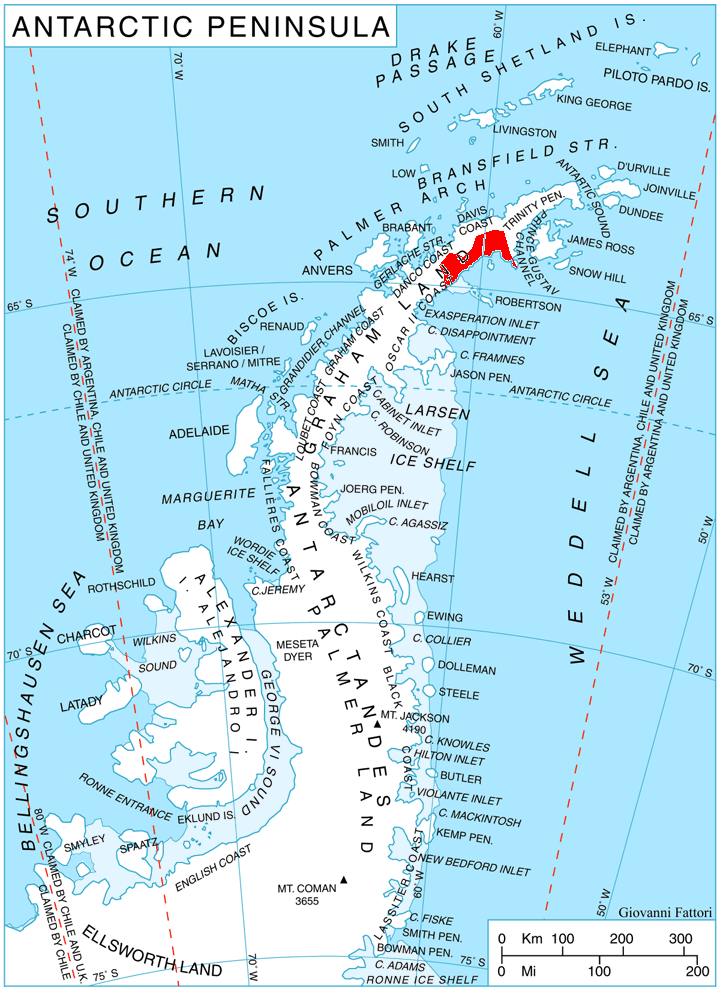
Location of Nordenskjöld Coast.

Kyustendil Ridge is a partly ice-free ridge rising to 1,774 m (5,820 ft) on Nordenskjöld Coast in Graham Land, Antarctica. It extends 23 km (14 mi) in a west–east direction between Foster Plateau and Weddell Sea, and is 10 km (6.2 mi) wide. The ridge is bounded by Drygalski Glacier to the north, and Rogosh Glacier and Zlokuchene Glacier to the south. It is linked by Mrahori Saddle to Lovech Heights to the south.

The feature is named after the city of Kyustendil in western Bulgaria, and was given to the ridge by Bulgaria and originally in the Bulgarian language: Кюстендилски хребет, romanised as Kyustendilski Hrebet.

== Location ==
Kyustendil Ridge is centred at 64°49′00″S 61°06′00″W, mapped by the British in 1978.
