= Rayko Aleksiev =

Bulgarian painter and caricaturist (1893–1944)

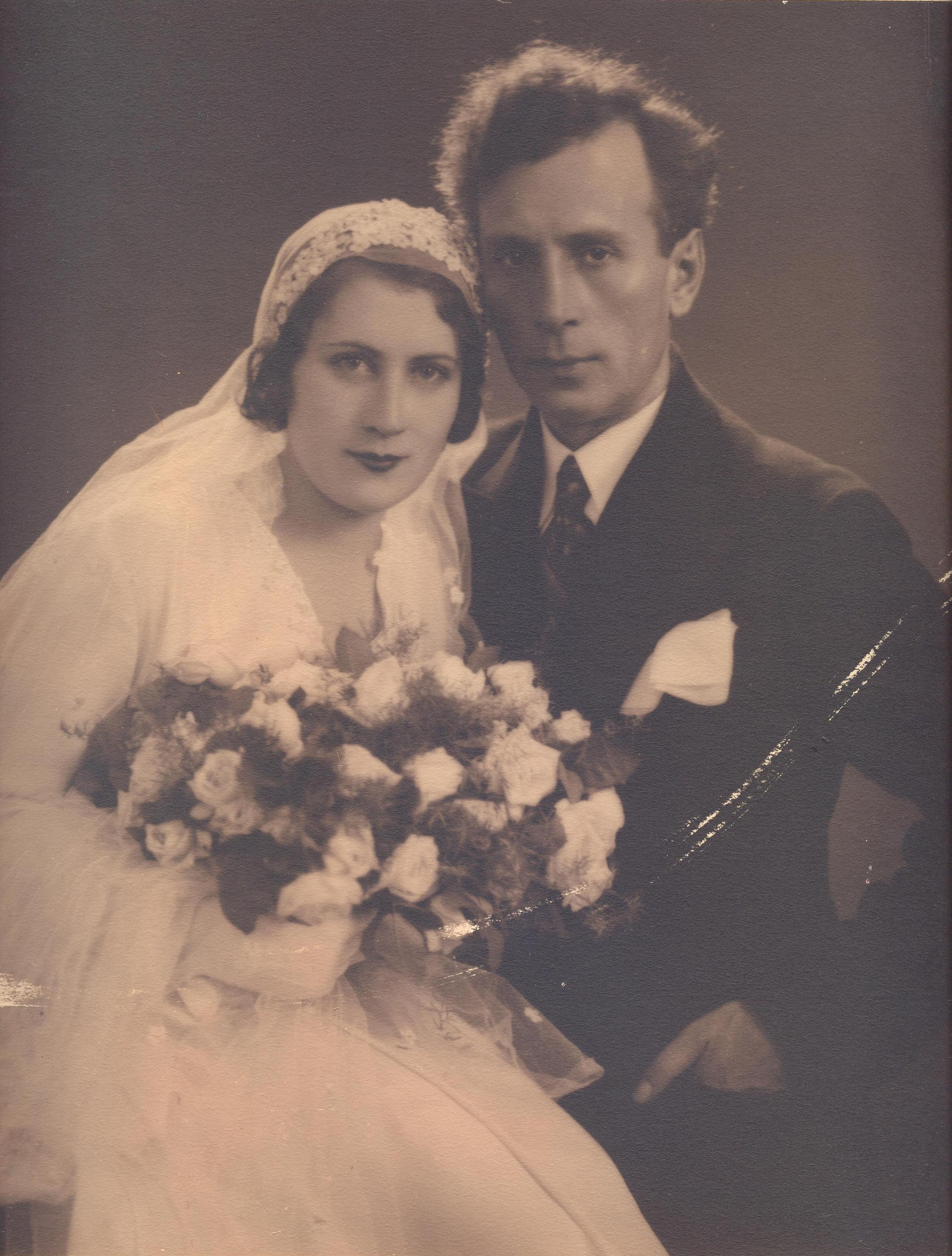
- Born: 7 March 1893; Pazardzhik, Bulgaria
- Died: 18 November 1944 (aged 51); Sofia, Bulgariа
- Resting place: Central Sofia Cemetery; 42°42′52.5″N 023°20′10.1″E
- Occupations: painter, caricaturist

Rayko Nikolov Aleksiev (Bulgarian: Райко Николов Алексиев; 7 March 1893 – 18 November 1944) was a Bulgarian painter, caricaturist, and writer of feuilletons. He established Shturets, a hugely successful satirical newspaper, in 1932.

Known for his uncompromising satire, Aleksiev was especially disliked by Bulgarian communists due to his famous caricatures of Joseph Stalin. After the Bulgarian coup d'état of 1944 he was, like many other intellectuals, arrested by the newly formed people's militia. While under arrest, he was severely beaten over the course of several days. He died from his wounds. Aleksiev was posthumously sentenced to death by the People's Court.

== Honours ==
Aleksiev Glacier on Nordenskjöld Coast in Graham Land, Antarctica is named after Rayko Aleksiev.

== Caricature Gallery ==
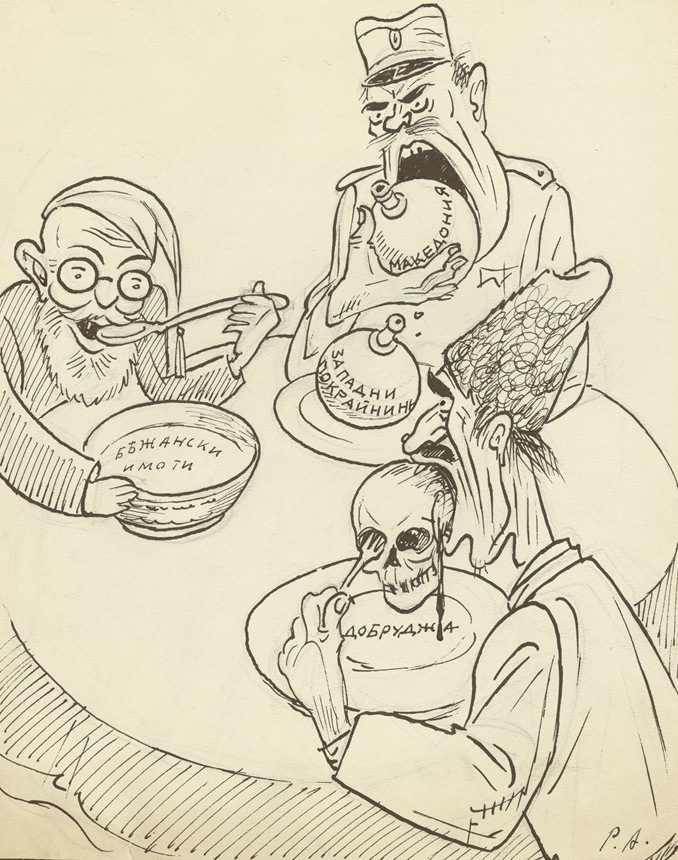
Greece, Serbia and Romania devouring Dobruja, Macedonia and the Western Outlands.

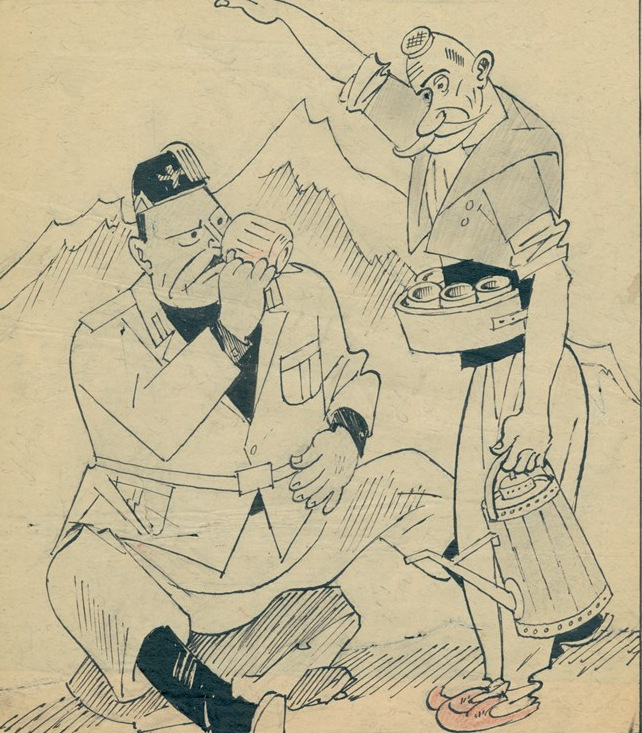
Mussolini enters the Balkans.

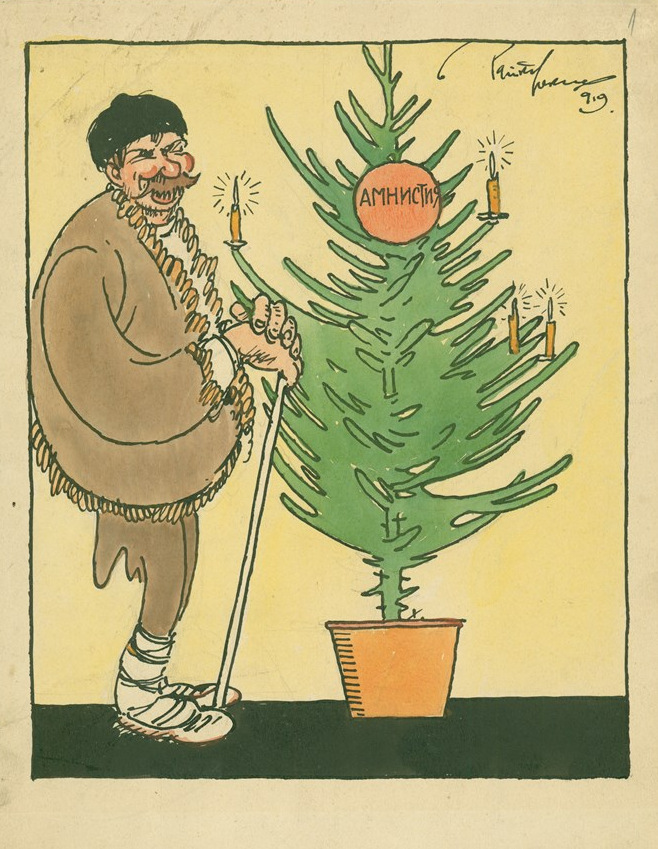
Bulgarian Amnesty of 1919.

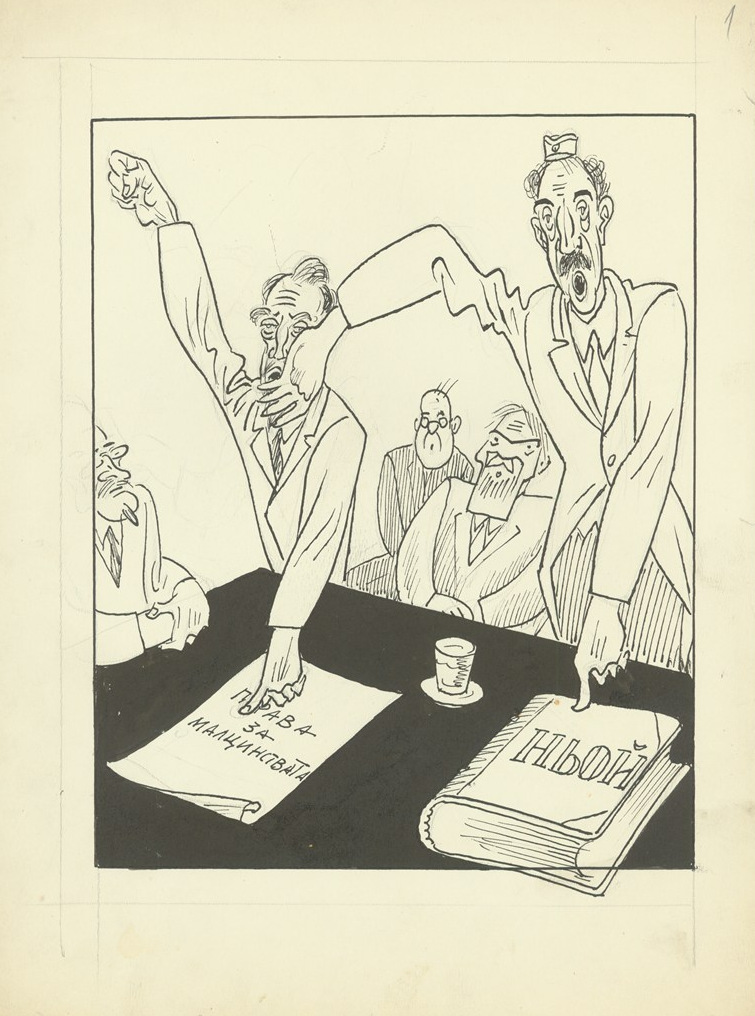
Treaty of Treaty of Neuilly-sur-Seine

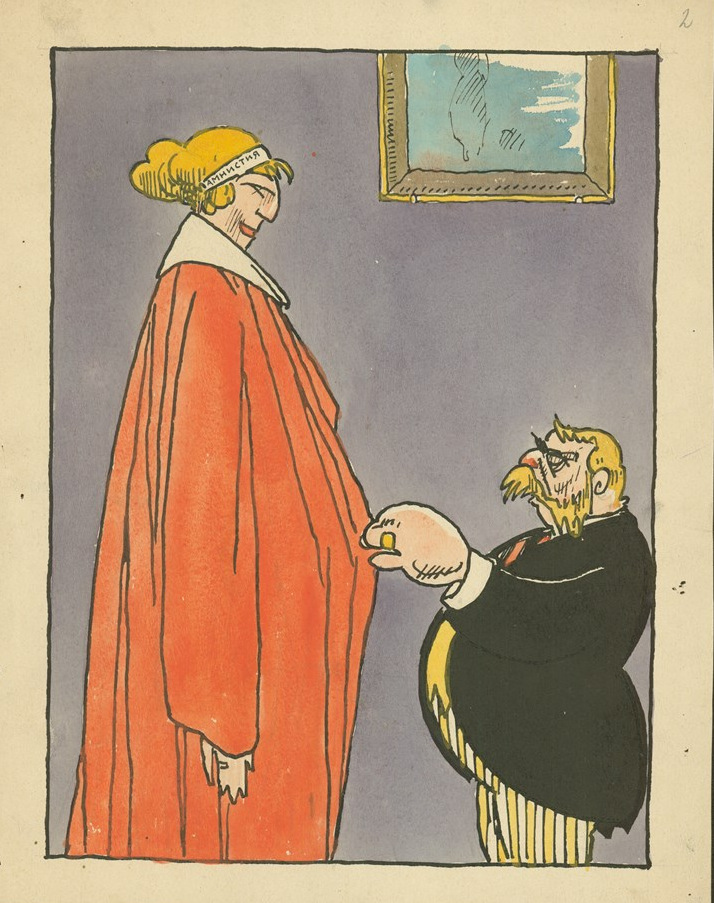
Bulgarian Amnesty of 1919.

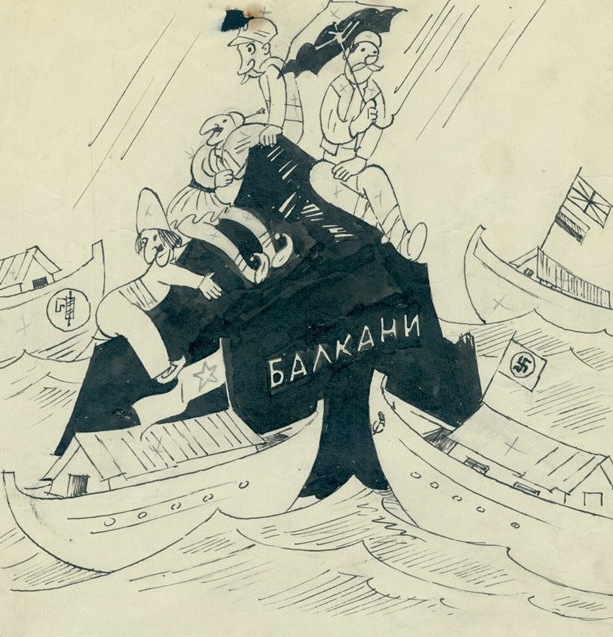
Italy, Germany, Great Britain and the Soviet Union contest the Balkans (1939)

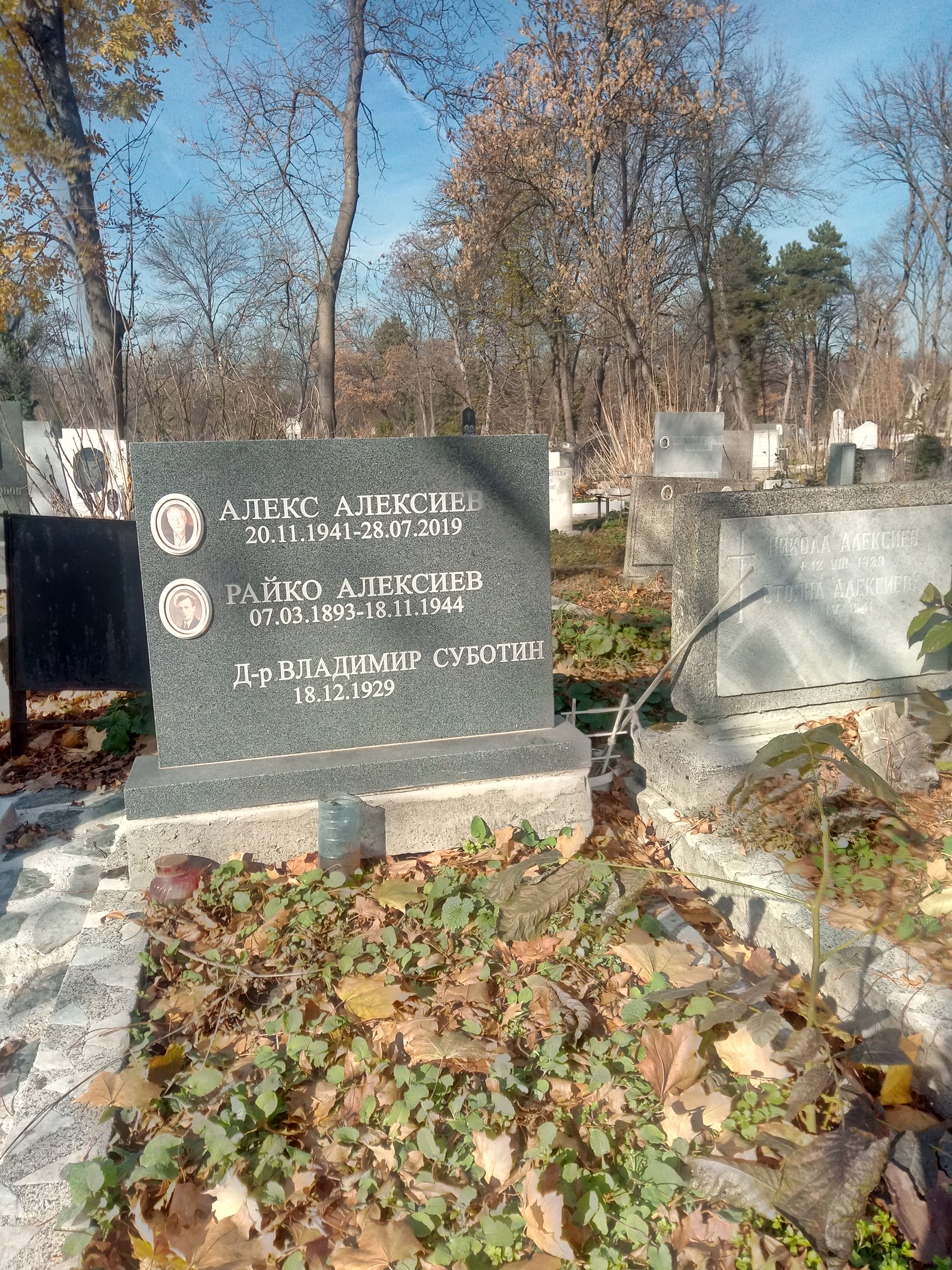
The Grave of Rayko Alexiev in Sofia Central Cemetery (42°42′52.5″N 023°20′10.1″E)
