= Andersson Peak =

Peak in Antarctica

Location of Oscar II Coast on Antarctic Peninsula.

Andersson Peak (64°52′S 61°2′W) is an ice-capped peak, 1,230 metres (4,040 ft) high, with rocky exposures on its east side, lying 9 nautical miles (17 km) north of Cape Fairweather and 5 miles (8.0 km) west of Tashukov Nunatak on the east coast of Graham Land, Antarctica. It was charted in 1947 by the Falkland Islands Dependencies Survey, and named by them for Karl Andreas Andersson, a zoologist with the Swedish Antarctic Expedition, who had explored along this coast in 1902.

== See also ==
- Andersson Nunatak
