= Odrin Bay =

Bay in Antarctica

- Location within Antarctica
- Coordinates: 64°34′40″S 60°20′30″W

Odrin Bay (64°34′40″S 60°20′30″W) is a 10 kilometres (6.2 mi) wide bay indenting for 7 kilometres (4.3 mi) along the Nordenskjöld Coast in Graham Land, Antarctica. It is entered southwest of Fothergill Point and northeast of Spoluka Point.

== Location ==
Nordenskjöld Coast, Antarctic Peninsula. Odrin Bay in center

Odrin Bay is on the Nordenskjöld Coast of the Antarctic Peninsula. It is southeast of the southern end of the Detroit Plateau, and opens onto the Weddell Sea to the south. Glaciers that flow into the bay include Arrol Icefall, Akaga Glacier, Sinion Glacier and Zaychar Glacier.

- Copernix satellite image

== Name ==
Odrin Bay is named after the settlements of Odrintsi in Northeastern and Southern Bulgaria.

== Features ==
Glaciers and other features around the bay include:

=== Arrol Icefall ===
64°35′S 60°40′W. A steep icefall about 3 nautical miles (5.6 km; 3.5 mi) long, originating on the south side of Detroit Plateau, about 8 nautical miles (15 km; 9.2 mi) northwest of Cape Worsley. Mapped from surveys by the Falkland Islands Dependencies Survey (FIDS) (1960-61). Named by the UK Antarctic Place-Names Committee (UK-APC) after the Arrol-Johnston car, which was adapted for use by Ernest Shackleton's Antarctic expedition (1907-09) and was the first mechanical transport used in Antarctica.

=== Spoluka Point ===
64°36′40″S 60°21′45″W. An ice-covered point on the southwest side of the entrance to Odrin Bay. Situated 6.9 kilometres (4.3 mi) southwest of Fothergill Point and 4.35 kilometres (2.70 mi) north of Cape Worsley. Formed as a result of the retreat of the glacier featuring Arrol Icefall in the early 21st century. Named after the settlement of Spoluka in Southern Bulgaria.

=== Akaga Glacier ===
64°33′50″S 60°27′40″W. A 5.7 kilometres (3.5 mi) long and 2.2 kilometres (1.4 mi) wide glacier situated south of Sinion Glacier and north of the glacier featuring Arrol Icefall. Draining the southeast slopes of Detroit Plateau, and flowing east-southeastwards to enter Odrin Bay. Named after the Bulgar woman ruler Akaga (6th century).

=== Sinion Glacier ===
64°32′40″S 60°26′50″W. A 6 kilometres (3.7 mi) long and 3 kilometres (1.9 mi) wide glacier situated southwest of Zaychar Glacier and north of Akaga Glacier. Draining the southeast slopes of Detroit Plateau, and flowing east-southeastwards along the south slopes of Kableshkov Ridge to enter Odrin Bay. Named after the 6th century Bulgar ruler Sinion.

=== Kableshkov Ridge ===
64°31′53″S 60°23′21″W. A rocky ridge extending 4.5 kilometres (2.8 mi) in WNW-ESE direction, 1.5 kilometres (0.93 mi) wide and rising to 678 metres (2,224 ft). Bounded by Zaychar Glacier to the N, Odrin Bay to the southeast and Sinion Glacier to the SW, and linked to Detroit Plateau to the W. Named after Todor Kableshkov (1851-1876), a leader of the April Uprising of 1876 for Bulgarian independence.

=== Zaychar Glacier ===
64°31′25″S 60°20′30″W. A 7.5 kilometres (4.7 mi) long and 2.7 kilometres (1.7 mi) wide glacier. Draining the southeast slopes of Detroit Plateau, flowing between Grivitsa Ridge and Kableshkov Ridge, and entering Odrin Bay 5 kilometres (3.1 mi) northwest of Fothergill Point. Named after the settlement of Zaychar in Southeastern Bulgaria.

=== Mikov Nunatak ===
64°30′39.4″S 60°24′21″W. A rocky ridge 1.35 kilometres (0.84 mi) long in northwest–southeast direction and 590 metres (1,940 ft) wide, rising to 758 metres (2,487 ft) in the upper course of Zaychar Glacier and linked on the northwest to Detroit Plateau. Situated 2.47 kilometres (1.53 mi) southwest of Batkun Peak in Grivitsa Ridge and 1.73 kilometres (1.07 mi) north of the summit of Kableshkov Ridge. Named after Miki Mikov, radio engineer at St. Kliment Ohridski base during the 1994/95 Bulgarian Antarctic campaign, which set the longterm directions of the Bulgarian Antarctic research.

=== Batkun Peak ===
64°30′13″S 60°21′29″W. A peak rising to 881 metres (2,890 ft) high in the southeast foothills of Detroit Plateau. Situated in the west part of Grivitsa Ridge, 9.43 kilometres (5.86 mi) northwest of Fothergill Point and 3.43 kilometres (2.13 mi) north-northeast of Kableshkov Ridge. Surmounting Darvari Glacier to the north and Zaychar Glacier to the south. Named after the settlement of Batkun in Southern Bulgaria.

=== Grivitsa Ridge ===
64°30′16″S 60°19′38″W. A mostly ice-free ridge extending 6.4 kilometres (4.0 mi) in northwest-southeast direction, 3 kilometres (1.9 mi) wide and rising to 1,027 metres (3,369 ft) at its northwest extremity. Bounded by Darvari Glacier to the north and Zaychar Glacier to the south, and linked to Detroit Plateau to the northwest. Named after the settlement of Grivitsa in Northern Bulgaria.

=== Marash Peak ===
64°30′33″S 60°18′20″W. A peak rising to 744 metres (2,441 ft) high in the southeast foothills of Detroit Plateau. Situated in the east part of Grivitsa Ridge, 2.6 kilometres (1.6 mi) east-southeast of Batkun Peak, 7.69 kilometres (4.78 mi) north-northwest of Fothergill Point and 4.71 kilometres (2.93 mi) northeast of Kableshkov Ridge. Surmounting Darvari Glacier to the north and east, and Zaychar Glacier to the southwest and south. Named after the settlement of Marash in Northeastern Bulgaria.

=== Fothergill Point ===
64°35′S 60°12′W. A low rocky coastal point 5 nautical miles (9.3 km; 5.8 mi) northeast of Cape Worsley, forming the west side of the entrance to Mundraga Bay and the northeast side of the entrance to Odrin Bay on the Nordenskjöld Coast, on the east side of Graham Land, Antarctica. Named by the UK-APC for lan L. Fothergill, leader and meteorological assistant at the FIDS station at Hope Bay, 1959-63.

== Sources ==
- "Akaga Glacier", Composite Gazetteer of Antarctica, Scientific Committee on Antarctic Research
- Alberts, Fred G., ed. (1995), Geographic Names of the Antarctic (PDF) (2 ed.), United States Board on Geographic Names This article incorporates public domain material from websites or documents of the United States Board on Geographic Names.
- "Batkun Peak", Composite Gazetteer of Antarctica, Scientific Committee on Antarctic Research
- Graham Land and South Shetland Islands, BAS: British Antarctic Survey, 2005
- "Grivitsa Ridge", Composite Gazetteer of Antarctica, Scientific Committee on Antarctic Research
- "Kableshkov Ridge", Composite Gazetteer of Antarctica, Scientific Committee on Antarctic Research
- "Marash Peak", Composite Gazetteer of Antarctica, Scientific Committee on Antarctic Research
- "Mikov Nunatak", Composite Gazetteer of Antarctica, Scientific Committee on Antarctic Research
- "Odrin Bay", Composite Gazetteer of Antarctica, Scientific Committee on Antarctic Research
- "Sinion Glacier", Composite Gazetteer of Antarctica, Scientific Committee on Antarctic Research
- "Spoluka Point", Composite Gazetteer of Antarctica, Scientific Committee on Antarctic Research
- "Zaychar Glacier", Composite Gazetteer of Antarctica, Scientific Committee on Antarctic Research
