= Balvan, Bulgaria =

Balvan Балван
- Village
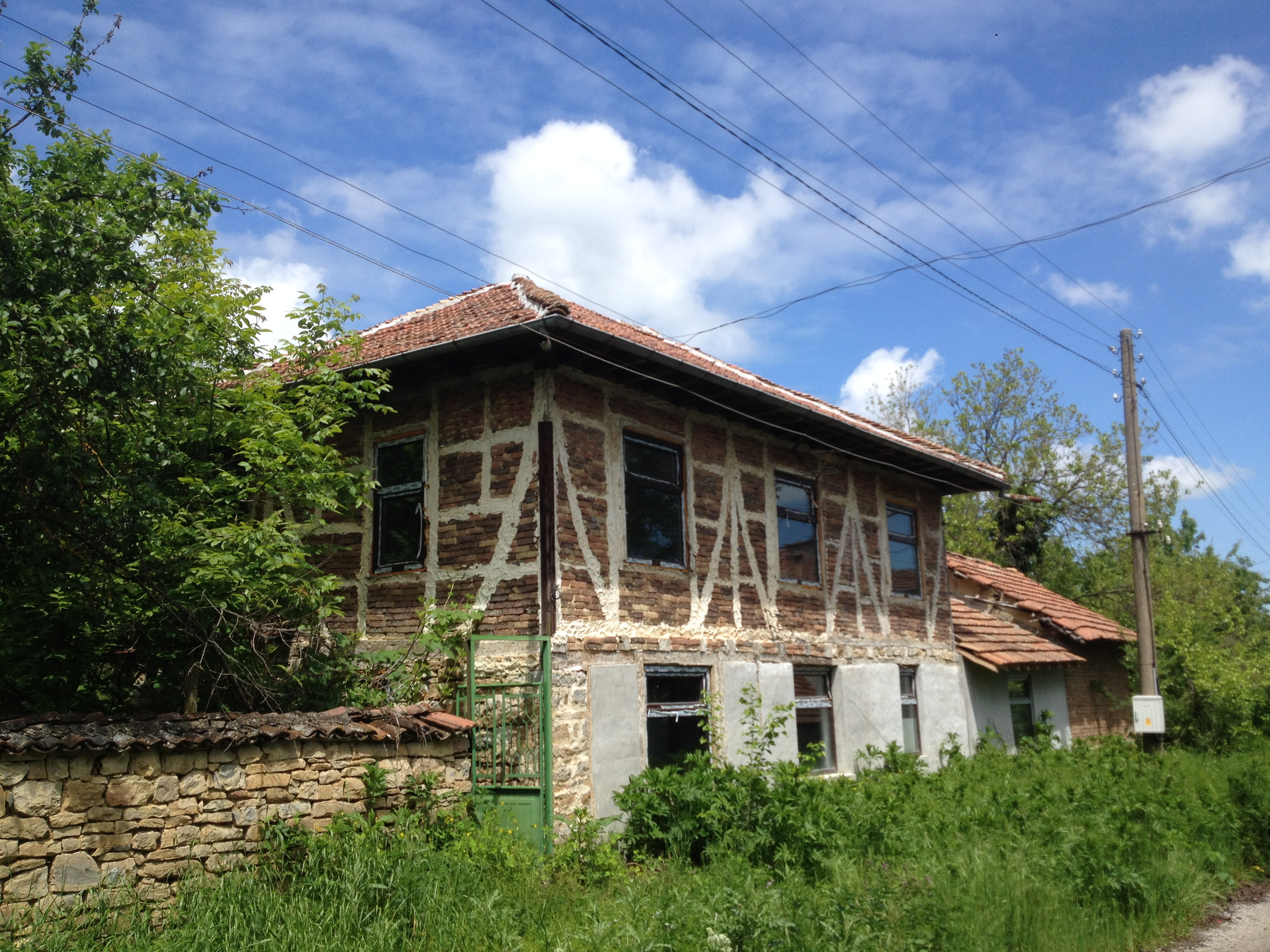

- Location within Bulgaria
- Coordinates: 43°05′09″N 25°24′44″E
- Country: Bulgaria
- Province: Veliko Tarnovo
- Municipality: Veliko Tarnovo Municipality

Government
  - Mayor: Rostislav Hristov

Area
  - Total: 33,670 km^{2} (13,000 sq mi)
- Elevation: 134 m (440 ft)

Population
  - Total: 601
- Time zone: UTC+2 (EET)
  - Summer (DST): UTC+3 (EEST)
- Post code: 5064
- Area code: 06113

Balvan is a village of Veliko Tarnovo Province, North Bulgaria. The village is about 16 kilometers away from Pavlikeni and around 19 kilometers away from Veliko Tarnovo.

== History ==
During the Liberation of Bulgaria around 60% of the population were Turkish. The village Vetrenci was the Bulgarian part of the village since 1944. After 1944 the population and the economy of the village grow up. It was made a new place for the farm machines and made mill and produce bread for many places in Veliko Tarnovo province.

== Farming ==
The head production in the village is for bakery. It had different varieties of wheat and rye.

== Honour ==
Balvan Point on Nordenskjöld Coast in Graham Land, Antarctica is named after Balvan.
