= Zlokuchene Glacier =

Glacier in Graham Land, Antarctica

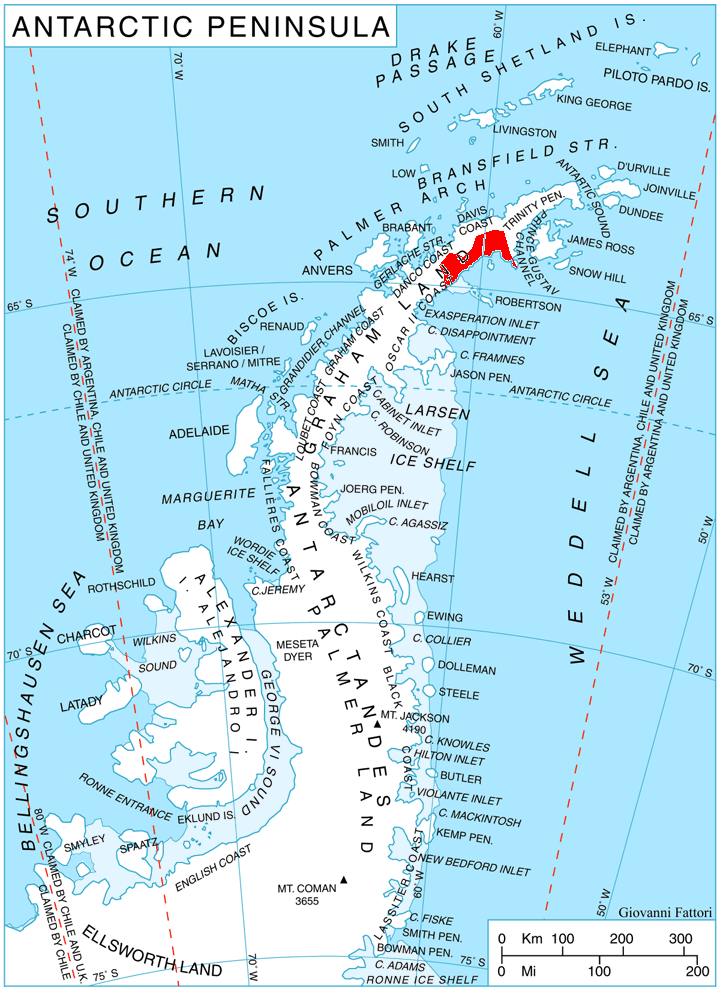
Location of Nordenskjöld Coast.

Zlokuchene Glacier (Bulgarian: ледник Злокучене, romanized: lednik Zlokuchene, IPA: [ˈlɛdniɡ zɫoˈkut͡ʃɛnɛ]) is the 13 km long and 3.5 km wide glacier on Nordenskjöld Coast in Graham Land, Antarctica situated north of Risimina Glacier, east of Rogosh Glacier and south of the lower course of Drygalski Glacier. It is draining from Mrahori Saddle eastwards between Kyustendil Ridge and Lovech Heights to flow into Weddell Sea northwest of Pedersen Nunatak.

The feature is named after the settlements of Zlokuchene in western and southern Bulgaria.

== Location ==
Zlokuchene Glacier is centred at 64°51′15″S 60°59′40″W. British mapping in 1978.

== Maps ==
- Antarctic Digital Database (ADD). Scale 1:250000 topographic map of Antarctica. Scientific Committee on Antarctic Research (SCAR), 1993–2016.
