= Ivanili =

- Village
- Location within Bulgaria
- Coordinates: 42.9500°N 25.3167°E
- Country: Bulgaria
- Province: Gabrovo Province
- Municipality: Gabrovo

Population (2019)
  - Total: 9
- Time zone: UTC+2 (EET)
  - Summer (DST): UTC+3 (EEST)

Ivanili is a village in Gabrovo Municipality, in Gabrovo Province, in northern central Bulgaria. It is located north of Gabrovo on the Strazhata plateau. It is built on the northern valley slope of a small tributary of Yantra, where it forms the 7 meters tall Ivanili waterfall.

== Honours ==
Ivanili Heights on Oscar II Coast in Graham Land, Antarctica is named after the village.
