= Desislava Cove =

Cove in Antarctica

- Location within Antarctica
- Coordinates: 64°38′45″S 60°26′50″W

Desislava Cove (64°38′45″S 60°26′50″W) is a 3.3 kilometres (2.1 mi) wide cove indenting for 3 kilometres (1.9 mi) the Nordenskjöld Coast in Graham Land west of Cape Worsley, Antarctica. It was formed as a result of the retreat of Aleksiev Glacier and Kladorub Glacier in the early 21st century.

== Location ==
Nordenskjöld Coast, Antarctic Peninsula. Desislava Cove in center

Desislava Cove is on the Nordenskjöld Coast of the Antarctic Peninsula. It is southeast of the southern end of the Detroit Plateau, and opens onto the Weddell Sea to the south. Odrin Bay is to the northeast and Solari Bay is to the southwest.

== Name ==
Desislava Cove is named after Desislava a 13th century Bulgarian sebastokrator.

== Features ==
=== Vrachesh Glacier ===
64°40′40″S 60°42′00″W A 10.3 kilometres (6.4 mi) long and 2.7 kilometres (1.7 mi) wide glacier situated southwest of Kladorub Glacier and northeast of Enravota Glacier. Draining the southeast slopes of Detroit Plateau, flowing southeastwards, and south of Papiya Nunatak turning east to enter Desislava Cove northeast of Richard Knoll. Named after the settlement of Vrachesh in Western Bulgaria.

=== Richard Knoll ===
64°42′00″S 60°37′30″W A coastal feature mid way between Cape Worsley and Sentinel Nunatak. Named after Mr Richard Harbour who contributed significantly to the British Antarctic Survey (BAS) survey programme during two years of fieldwork in the Trinity Peninsula and Nordenskjöld Coast areas, and in 1966 in the Bransfield Strait.

=== Cruyt Spur ===
64°37′S 60°42′W. A rocky spur 4 nautical miles (7.4 km; 4.6 mi) northeast of Ruth Ridge, extending 2 nautical miles (3.7 km; 2.3 mi) southeast from the south wall of Detroit Plateau. Mapped from surveys by the Falkland Islands Dependencies Survey (FIDS) (1960–61). Named by the UK Antarctic Place-Names Committee (UK-APC) for William Cruyt, Belgian army engineer who designed the first "auto-polaire" in 1907.

=== Kladorub Glacier ===
64°39′20″S 60°37′00″W. A 14 kilometres (8.7 mi) long and 3.5 kilometres (2.2 mi) wide glacier situated southwest of Aleksiev Glacier and northeast of Vrachesh Glacier. Draining the southeast slopes of Detroit Plateau, flowing southeastwards between Cruyt Spur and Papiya Nunatak, and turning east to enter Desislava Cove. Named after the settlement of Kladorub in Northwestern Bulgaria.

=== Papiya Nunatak ===
64°40′23″S 60°40′31″W. A rocky hill rising to 666 metres (2,185 ft) high in the south foothills of Detroit Plateau. Situated north of the terminus of Drygalski Glacier, 6.2 kilometres (3.9 mi) south-southwest of Cruyt Spur and 14.6 kilometres (9.1 mi) west by south of Cape Worsley. Named after Papiya Peak on the Bulgarian Black Sea coast.

=== Glazne Buttress ===
64°35′10″S 60°38′40″W. An ice-covered buttress rising to 1,730 metres (5,680 ft) high in the southeast foothills of Detroit Plateau. Situated between Arrol Icefall and upper Aleksiev Glacier, 9.85 kilometres (6.12 mi) north of Papiya Nunatak. Precipitous, partly ice-free northeast and south slopes. Named after the Glazne river in Southwestern Bulgaria.

=== Aleksiev Glacier ===
64°37′30″S 60°32′00″W. A 10.5 kilometres (6.5 mi) long and 3 kilometres (1.9 mi) wide glacier situated northeast of Kladorub Glacier and south of the glacier featuring Arrol Icefall. Draining the southeast slopes of Detroit Plateau, and flowing east-southeastwards to enter Desislava Cove. Named after the Bulgarian artist and writer Rayko Aleksiev (1893-1944).

=== Raven Peninsula ===
64°38′00″S 60°23′00″W. A mostly ice-covered peninsula projecting 5.5 kilometres (3.4 mi) southeastwards, and 5.2 kilometres (3.2 mi) wide. Bounded by Odrin Bay to the north and Desislava Cove to the SW, and ending in Cape Worsley to the southeast. Formed as a result of the retreat of Aleksiev Glacier and the glacier featuring Arrol Icefall in the early 21st century. Named after the town of Raven in medieval Southwestern Bulgaria.

=== Cape Worsley ===
64°39′S 60°24′W. A dome-shaped cape 225 metres (738 ft) high with snow-free cliffs on the south and east sides, lying 10 nautical miles (19 km; 12 mi) east of the south end of Detroit Plateau. Charted by the FIDS in 1947 and named for Commander Frank Worsley, British polar explorer and member of Sir Ernest Shackleton's expeditions of 1914-16 and 1921-22.

== Sources ==
- Alberts, Fred G., ed. (1995), Geographic Names of the Antarctic (PDF) (2 ed.), United States Board on Geographic Names This article incorporates public domain material from websites or documents of the United States Board on Geographic Names.
- "Aleksiev Glacier", Composite Gazetteer of Antarctica, Scientific Committee on Antarctic Research

REMA Explorer
The Reference Elevation Model of Antarctica (REMA) gives ice surface measurements of most of the continent. When a feature is ice-covered, the ice surface will differ from the underlying rock surface and will change over time. To see ice surface contours and elevation of a feature as of the last REMA update,
- Open the Antarctic REMA Explorer
- Enter the feature's coordinates in the box at the top left that says "Find address or place", then press enter
  The coordinates should be in DMS format, e.g. 65°05'03"S 64°01'02"W. If you only have degrees and minutes, you may not be able to locate the feature.
- Hover over the icons at the left of the screen
- Find "Hillshade" and click on that
  In the bottom right of the screen, set "Shading Factor" to 0 to get a clearer image
- Find "Contour" and click on that
  In the "Contour properties" box, select Contour Interval = 1m
  You can zoom in and out to see the ice surface contours of the feature and nearby features
- Find "Identify" and click on that
  Click the point where the contour lines seem to indicate the top of the feature
  The "Identify" box will appear to the top left. The Orthometric height is the elevation of the ice surface of the feature at this point.

- Antarctic REMA Explorer (Digital Elevation Models created by the Polar Geospatial Center from Maxar imagery), Polar Geospatial Center, University of Minnesota, 2019
- "Desislava Cove", Composite Gazetteer of Antarctica, Scientific Committee on Antarctic Research
- "Glazne Buttress", Composite Gazetteer of Antarctica, Scientific Committee on Antarctic Research
- Graham Land and South Shetland Islands, BAS: British Antarctic Survey, 2005
- "Kladorub Glacier", Composite Gazetteer of Antarctica, Scientific Committee on Antarctic Research
- "Papiya Nunatak", Composite Gazetteer of Antarctica, Scientific Committee on Antarctic Research
- "Raven Peninsula", Composite Gazetteer of Antarctica, Scientific Committee on Antarctic Research
- "Richard Knoll", Composite Gazetteer of Antarctica, Scientific Committee on Antarctic Research
- "Vrachesh Glacier", Composite Gazetteer of Antarctica, Scientific Committee on Antarctic Research
