= Monastir =

Monastir may refer to:

== Places ==
=== Tunisia ===
- Monastir, Tunisia, the capital of Monastir Governorate
  - Monastir Habib Bourguiba International Airport
- Monastir Governorate, one of the twenty-four governorates of Tunisia

=== Other places ===
- Manastir, Republic of North Macedonia, the former name of Bitola
- Manastir vilayet, covering parts of modern Albania, Greece and North Macedonia
- Monastir, Sardinia, a comune in the Province of Cagliari, Italy

== Other uses ==
- US Monastir, a football club from Monastir, Tunisia

== See also ==
- Manastir (disambiguation)
- Monastery
