= Manastır Türküsü =

Turkish song

Manastır Türküsü, also called Manastırın ortasında is a Turkish song, sometimes played on a saz, that is known for being a favorite of Mustafa Kemal Atatürk and played at gatherings he attended, where he and other guests would reportedly sing along with the musicians. Several Turkish recording artists including Okan Murat Öztürk have released versions of the song. It was played by the Istanbul State Symphony Orchestra as part of their special Atatürk'ün Sevdiği Şarkılar (Songs Atatürk Loved) concert.

There is more than one version of the lyrics. One version begins:

Manastırın ortasında var bir hamam
Canım hamam.
Manastırın kızlarının hepsi de yaman

In the center of Manastır, there is a hamam
My dear hamam.
All the girls of Manastır, all of them formidable
