= Manastir, Prilep =

Manastir Манастир
- Village
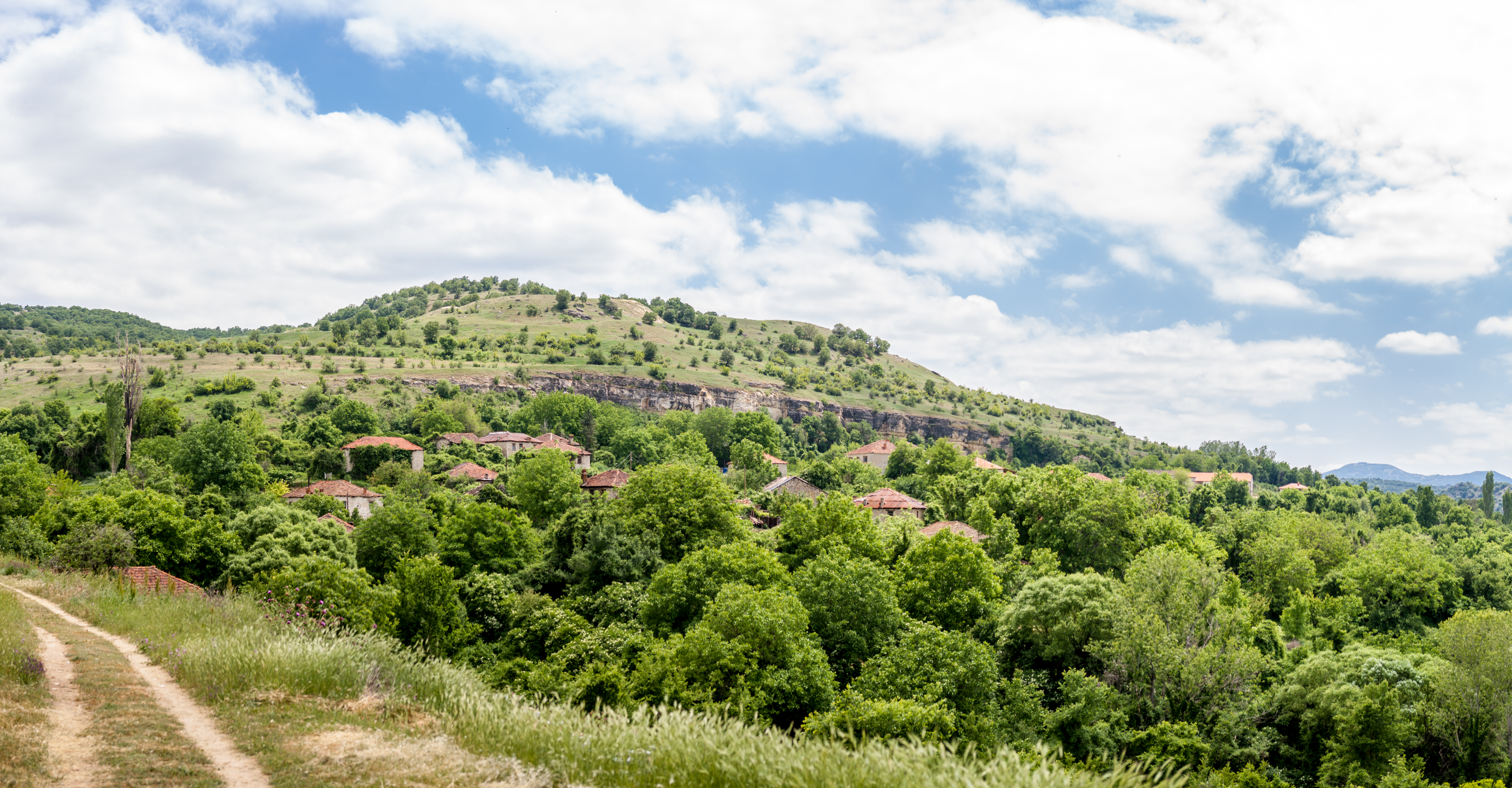
- Panoramic view of the village

- Location within North Macedonia
- Country: North Macedonia
- Region: Pelagonia
- Municipality: Prilep
- Elevation: 690 m (2,260 ft)

Population (2002)
  - Total: 4
- Time zone: UTC+1 (CET)
- Area code: +389/48/4XXXXX

Manastir is a village in Municipality of Prilep, North Macedonia. It used to be part of the former municipality of Vitolište.

== Demographics ==
According to the 2002 census, the village had a total of 4 inhabitants. Ethnic groups in the village include:

- Macedonians 4
