= Fizalia Island =

Island in Palmer Archipelago, Antarctica

- Location within Antarctica Location within Antarctic Peninsula

Geography
- Location: Antarctica
- Coordinates: 63°43′44″S 60°36′00″W
- Archipelago: Palmer Archipelago
- Length: 330 m (1080 ft)
- Width: 180 m (590 ft)

Administration
- Antarctica
- Administered under the Antarctic Treaty System

Demographics
- Population: uninhabited

Fizalia Island (Bulgarian: остров Физалия, romanized: ostrov Fizalia, IPA: [ˈɔstrof fiˈzalijɐ]) is the mostly ice-covered rocky island 330 m long in southeast-northwest direction and 180 m wide, lying off the northeast coast of Trinity Island in the Palmer Archipelago, Antarctica. It is “named after the ocean fishing trawler Fizalia of the Bulgarian company Ocean Fisheries – Burgas whose ships operated in the waters of South Georgia, Kerguelen, the South Orkney Islands, South Shetland Islands and Antarctic Peninsula from 1970 to the early 1990s. The Bulgarian fishermen, along with those of the Soviet Union, Poland and East Germany are the pioneers of modern Antarctic fishing industry.”

== Location ==
Fizalia Island is located at 63°43′44″S 60°36′00″W, which is 4.2 km southwest of Cape Neumayer and 14.55 km north of Awl Point. British mapping in 1978.

== Maps ==
- British Antarctic Territory. Scale 1:200000 topographic map. DOS 610 – W 63 60. Tolworth, UK, 1978.
- Antarctic Digital Database (ADD). Scale 1:250000 topographic map of Antarctica. Scientific Committee on Antarctic Research (SCAR). Since 1993, regularly upgraded and updated.
