= Mural Nunatak =

Nunatak in Graham Land, Antarctica

Mural Nunatak (64°59′S 61°32′W) is a conspicuous nunatak on the east side of Hektoria Glacier, 5 nautical miles (9 km) northwest of Shiver Point, in Graham Land. Surveyed by Falkland Islands Dependencies Survey (FIDS) in 1947 and 1955. The name, given by United Kingdom Antarctic Place-Names Committee (UK-APC), is descriptive of the nunatak's wall-like appearance when seen from the southwest.
