= Manastir, Haskovo Province =

Manastir
- Village
- Location in Bulgaria
- Coordinates: 41.861°N 25.581°E
- Country: Bulgaria
- Province: Haskovo Province
- Municipality: Haskovo
- Time zone: UTC+2 (EET)
  - Summer (DST): UTC+3 (EEST)

Manastir is a village in the municipality of Haskovo, in Haskovo Province, in southern Bulgaria.

Manastir Peak on Oscar II Coast in Graham Land, Antarctica is named after the village.
