= Farmakida Cove =

Location of Alexander Island in the Antarctic Peninsula region

Satellite image of Alexander Island

Farmakida Cove (Bulgarian: залив Фармакида, ‘Zaliv Farmakida’ \'za-liv far-ma-'ki-da\) is the 7 km wide cove indenting for 3.3 km the northeast coast of Alexander Island in Antarctica. It is entered south of Nicholas Point, and has its head fed by Roberts Ice Piedmont. It is surmounted by Mount Calais on the southwest. The feature is named after the ancient Thracian fortress of Farmakida in Southeastern Bulgaria.

== Location ==
The cove is centered at 69°07′30″S 70°03′00″W.

== Maps ==
- British Antarctic Territory. Scale 1:200000 topographic map. DOS 610 – W 69 70. Tolworth, UK, 1971
- Antarctic Digital Database (ADD). Scale 1:250000 topographic map of Antarctica. Scientific Committee on Antarctic Research (SCAR). Since 1993, regularly upgraded and updated
