= Skilly (food) =

Thin soup usually served to prisoners

Skilly was a weak broth that was made with oatmeal mixed with water. It was often served as an evening meal at sea during the Age of Sail, when it was made using the water in which the salted meat had been boiled. From the 17th to the early 19th century, it was often the principal food of naval prisoners of war and other prisoners incarcerated in prison ships. It was also served "twice or thrice a day" to navvies. Well into the 20th century, it was also served in workhouses and hostels for tramps; George Orwell was told by an Irish tramp that the skilly being served at one London hostel was nothing more than "a can o' hot water wid some bloody oatmeal at de bottom".
