= Rabisha Rocks =

Rocks in the South Shetland Islands, Antarctica

- Location of Greenwich Island in the South Shetland Islands

- Location on Antarctic Peninsula Location in Antarctica

Geography
- Location: Antarctica
- Coordinates: 62°25′34.0″S 59°56′20.1″W
- Archipelago: South Shetland Islands

Administration
- Antarctica
- Administered under the Antarctic Treaty System

Demographics
- Population: uninhabited

Rabisha Rocks (Bulgarian: скали Рабиша, ‘Skali Rabisha’ ska-'li ra-'bi-sha) is a group of rocks off the north coast of Greenwich Island in the South Shetland Islands, Antarctica situated 1.5 km (0.93 mi) northeast of Voluyak Rocks, 1.3 km (0.81 mi) north of Kabile Island and 1.8 km (1.12 mi) west of Ongley Island.

The rocks are named after the settlement of Rabisha and the homonymous lake in northwestern Bulgaria.

== Location ==
Rabisha Rocks are located at 62°25′33.5″S 59°56′22″W (Bulgarian mapping in 2009).

Topographic map of Livingston Island, Greenwich, Robert, Snow and Smith Islands.

== See also ==
- Composite Antarctic Gazetteer
- List of Antarctic islands south of 60° S
- SCAR
- Territorial claims in Antarctica
- South Shetland Islands

== Maps ==
- L.L. Ivanov. Antarctica: Livingston Island and Greenwich, Robert, Snow and Smith Islands. Scale 1:120000 topographic map. Troyan: Manfred Wörner Foundation, 2009. ISBN 978-954-92032-6-4
