= Artanes Bay =

Bay in Antarctica

Location of Oscar II Coast on Antarctic Peninsula.

Artanes Bay (Bulgarian: залив Артанес, ‘Zaliv Artanes’ \'za-liv 'ar-ta-nes\) is the 14 km wide cove indenting for 6.2 km Oscar II Coast in Graham Land, Antarctica, and entered west of Cape Fairweather and east of Shiver Point. It was formed as a result of the break-up of Larsen Ice Shelf in the area in 2002, and subsequent retreat of Rogosh Glacier.

The feature is named after the ancient settlement of Artanes in northwestern Bulgaria.

== Location ==
Artanes Bay is located at 65°01′00″S 61°11′00″W. SCAR Antarctic Digital Database mapping in 2012.

== Maps ==
- Antarctic Digital Database (ADD). Scale 1:250000 topographic map of Antarctica. Scientific Committee on Antarctic Research (SCAR). Since 1993, regularly upgraded and updated.
