= Shiver Point =

Location of Oscar II Coast on Antarctic Peninsula.

Shiver Point (65°3′S 61°22′W) is a point, surmounted by a peak 670 cm high, 8 miles (13 km) west of Cape Fairweather on the east coast of Graham Land, Antarctica forming the west side of the entrance to Artanes Bay and the northeast side of the entrance to Vaughan Inlet.

The point was charted in 1947 by the Falkland Islands Dependencies Survey (FIDS) and named by the United Kingdom Antarctic Place-Names Committee (UK-APC) in 1950. The name is suggestive of the cold.
