= Cape Fairweather =

Cape in Antarctica

Coordinates: 65°0′S 61°1′W

Cape Fairweather is a cape in Antarctica that is 705 metres (2,310 ft) high and is ice-covered except for rocky exposures along its southeast and east sides. It lies midway between Drygalski Glacier and Evans Glacier on the east coast of Graham Land and divides Nordenskjöld Coast from Oscar II Coast. Rogosh Glacier branches at the ridge forming Cape Fairweather and flows into Artanes Bay to the south, and into Weddell Sea west of Pedersen Nunatak to the east. The cape was charted in 1947 by the Falkland Islands Dependencies Survey, which named it for Alexander Fairweather, captain of the Dundee whaler Balaena, which operated along the northeast coast of the Antarctic Peninsula in 1892–1893.
