= Skilly Peak =

Mountain in Antarctica

Location of Oscar II Coast on Antarctic Peninsula.

Skilly Peak (64°59′S 61°16′W) is a conspicuous rock peak 4.3 miles (6.9 km) northeast of Shiver Point and 3.5 miles (5.6 km) northeast of Eduard Nunatak on the east coast of Graham Land, Antarctica. It surmounts Rogosh Glacier to the north and Artanes Bay to the southeast.

The peak was surveyed by Falkland Islands Dependencies Survey (FIDS) in 1947 and 1955. "Skilly" means a thin soup; the name arose because the 1955 FIDS party was short of rations, and pemmican and porridge were very thin.
