= Ivanili Heights =

Hills in Antarctica

Location of Oscar II Coast on Antarctic Peninsula.

Ivanili Heights (Bulgarian: Иванилски възвишения, ‘Ivanilski Vazvisheniya’ \i-va-'nil-ski v&z-vi-'she-ni-ya\) are the heights extending 10 km in north–south direction and 7.5 km wide, rising to 1434 m (Stargel Peak) on Oscar II Coast in Graham Land. They are bounded by Brenitsa Glacier to the west and Rogosh Glacier to the east, and linked by Okorsh Saddle to Foster Plateau to the north. The feature is named after the settlement of Ivanili in Northern Bulgaria.

== Location ==
Ivanili Heights are centred at 64°52′30″S 61°25′00″W. British mapping in 1978.

== Maps ==
- British Antarctic Territory. Scale 1:200000 topographic map. DOS 610 Series, Sheet W 64 60. Directorate of Overseas Surveys, Tolworth, UK, 1978.
- Antarctic Digital Database (ADD). Scale 1:250000 topographic map of Antarctica. Scientific Committee on Antarctic Research (SCAR), 1993–2016.
