= Pedersen Nunatak =

Nunatak in Graham Land, Antarctica

Pedersen Nunatak (64°56′S 60°44′W) is the westernmost of the Seal Nunataks, lying 8 nautical miles (15 km) northeast of Cape Fairweather, off the east coast of Antarctic Peninsula. First charted in 1947 by the Falkland Islands Dependencies Survey (FIDS), and named for Captain Morten Pedersen of the Norwegian sealer Castor, which operated in Antarctic waters during the 1893–94 season.
