= Lovech Heights =

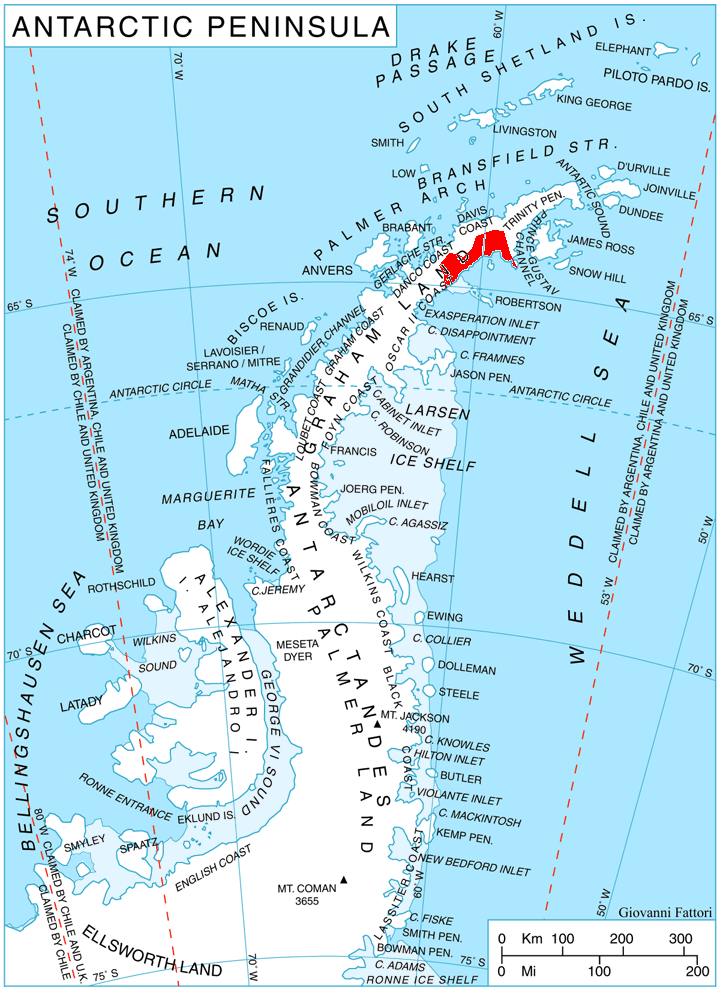
Location of Nordenskjöld Coast.

Lovech Heights (Bulgarian: Ловешки възвишения, ‘Loveshki Vazvisheniya’ \'lo-vesh-ki v&-zvi-'she-ni-ya\) are the heights rising to 1634 m (Mount Moriya) on Nordenskjöld Coast in Graham Land, Antarctica. They are extending 15.5 km in east-west direction and 9.7 km wide, and are bounded by Rogosh Glacier to the northwest and south, Zlokuchene Glacier to the northeast and Weddell Sea to the east. Mrahori Saddle links the heights to Kyustendil Ridge to the north.

The feature is named after the city of Lovech in northern Bulgaria.

== Location ==
Lovech Heights are centred at 64°53′00″S 61°08′00″W. British mapping in 1978.

== Maps ==
- Antarctic Digital Database (ADD). Scale 1:250000 topographic map of Antarctica. Scientific Committee on Antarctic Research (SCAR). Since 1993, regularly upgraded and updated.
