= Rogosh Glacier =

Glacier in Antarctica

Location of Oscar II Coast on Antarctic Peninsula.

Rogosh Glacier (Bulgarian: ледник Рогош, romanized: lednik Rogosh, IPA: [ˈlɛdnik roˈɡɔʃ]) is the 29 km long and 5 km wide glacier on Oscar II Coast, Graham Land in Antarctica situated east of Brenitsa Glacier, south of Drygalski Glacier, and southwest of Zlokuchene Glacier and Risimina Glacier. Draining southwards from Kyustendil Ridge between Lovech Heights and Ivanili Heights, and turning eastwards north of Skilly Peak. At the ridge forming Cape Fairweather the glacier branches to flow into Artanes Bay to the south, and into Weddell Sea west of Pedersen Nunatak to the east.

The feature is named after the settlement of Rogosh in southern Bulgaria.

== Location ==
Rogosh Glacier is centred at 64°55′00″S 61°19′00″W. British mapping in 1974.

== Maps ==
- Antarctic Digital Database (ADD). Scale 1:250000 topographic map of Antarctica. Scientific Committee on Antarctic Research (SCAR), 1993–2016.

== Honours ==
Rogosh Glacier Street in the city of Sofia is named after the feature.
