= Drygalski Glacier (Antarctica) =

Glacier in Antarctica

- Location within Antarctica
- Location: Graham Land
- Coordinates: 64°43′S 60°44′W
- Length: 18 nmi (33 km; 21 mi)
- Terminus: Solari Bay

Drygalski Glacier (64°43′S 60°44′W) is a broad glacier, 18 nautical miles (33 km; 21 mi) long which flows southeast from Herbert Plateau through a rectangular re-entrant to a point immediately north of Sentinel Nunatak on the east coast of Graham Land, Antarctica.

== Location ==
Nordenskjöld Coast, Antarctic Peninsula. Drygalski Glacier near the southwest end

Drygalski Glacier is on the Nordenskjöld Coast of the Antarctic Peninsula. It is east of the Forbidden Plateau, southeast of the Herbert Plateau, southwest of the Detroit Plateau and northeast of the Weddell Sea. The Foster Plateau, Anderson Peak and Seal Nunataks are to the south.

== Discovery and name ==
Drygalski Glacier was discovered in 1902 by the Swedish Antarctic Expedition (SwedAE), under Otto Nordenskiöld, and named "Drygalski Bay" after Professor Erich von Drygalski. The feature was determined to be a glacier by the Falkland Islands Dependencies Survey (FIDS) in 1947.

== Upper features ==
Features around the head of the glacier include:

=== Foster Plateau ===
64°43′S 61°25′W. A plateau, about 80 square miles (210 km^{2}) in area, lying between Drygalski Glacier and Hektoria Glacier. Photographed by the Falkland Islands and Dependencies Aerial Survey Expedition (FIDASE) in 1956-57 and mapped from these photos by the Falkland Islands Dependencies Survey (FIDS). Named by the UK Antarctic Place-Names Committee (UK-APC) in 1960 for Richard A. Foster, FIDS leader of the Danco Island station in 1956 and 1957.

=== Fender Buttress ===
64°34′S 61°04′W. A rock buttress rising to more than 1,600 metres (5,200 ft) high, projecting from the south side of Herbert Plateau into the head of Drygalski Glacier. Mapped from surveys by FIDS (1960–61). Named by the UK-APC for Guillaume Fender of Buenos Aires, inventor of an early type of track-laying vehicle (British Patent of 1882, taken out by John C. Mewburn).

=== Molerov Spur ===
64°33′19″S 60°59′31″W A ridge extending 4.5 kilometres (2.8 mi) in the south foothills of Herbert Plateau. Descending southwards into Drygalski Glacier, with ice-covered upper part rising to 1,600 metres (5,200 ft) high and rocky lower part rising to 1,400 metres (4,600 ft). Situated 8.5 kilometres (5.3 mi) northwest of Stoykite Buttress, 3.5 kilometres (2.2 mi) northeast of Fender Buttress, and 6 kilometres (3.7 mi) southwest of The Catwalk. Named after the Bulgarian artist Dimitar Tomov Molerov (1780–1853).

=== Odesos Buttress ===
64°32′40″S 60°54′40″W An ice-covered buttress rising to 1,800 metres (5,900 ft) high in the southwest foothills of Detroit Plateau. Situated between south-southwest-flowing tributaries to Drygalski Glacier, 4 kilometres (2.5 mi) northwest of Konstantin Buttress, 4 kilometres (2.5 mi) east-northeast of Molerov Spur, and 4.15 kilometres (2.58 mi) south of The Catwalk. Precipitous, partly ice-free west and southeast slopes. Named after the ancient town of Odesos in Northeastern Bulgaria.

=== Konstantin Buttress ===
64°33′45″S 60°50′20″W An ice-covered buttress rising to 1,830 metres (6,000 ft) high in the southwest foothills of Detroit Plateau. Situated between southwest-flowing tributaries to Drygalski Glacier, 9.7 kilometres (6.0 mi) west-northwest of Glazne Buttress, 4.5 kilometres (2.8 mi) north of Stoykite Buttress, and 4 kilometres (2.5 mi) southeast of Odesos Buttress. Precipitous, partly ice-free west and south slopes. Named after the Bulgarian ruler Czar Konstantin II, 1396-1422.

=== Stoykite Buttress ===
64°36′10″S 60°51′10″W An ice-covered buttress rising to 1,650 metres (5,410 ft) high in the southwest foothills of Detroit Plateau. Situated between west-flowing tributaries to Drygalski Glacier, 4.2 kilometres (2.6 mi) north of Ruth Ridge, 10.35 kilometres (6.43 mi) east of the south extremity of Fender Buttress, and 4.5 kilometres (2.8 mi) south of Konstantin Buttress. Precipitous, partly ice-free northwest and southeast slopes. Named after the settlement of Stoykite in Southern Bulgaria.

== Lower features ==
Features around the mouth of the glacier include:

=== Ruth Ridge ===
64°39′S 60°48′W. A black, rocky ridge 1.5 nautical miles (2.8 km; 1.7 mi) long in a N-S direction, terminating at its south end in a small peak. The ridge forms the south end of Detroit Plateau and marks a change in the direction of the plateau escarpment along the east coast of Graham Land where it turns west to form the north wall of Drygalski Glacier. Doctor Otto Nordenskiöld, leader of the SwedAE, 1901–04, gave the name Cape Ruth, in honor of his sister, to what appeared to be a cape at the north side of Drygalski Glacier. The feature was determined to be a ridge in 1947 by the FIDS.

=== Enravota Glacier ===
64°41′00″S 60°48′10″W A 10 kilometres (6.2 mi) long and 3.5 kilometres (2.2 mi) wide glacier situated southwest of Vrachesh Glacier and north of lower Drygalski Glacier. Draining the south slopes of Ruth Ridge, and flowing southeastwards to join Drygalski Glacier east of Bekker Nunataks. Named after the Bulgarian prince St. Boyan-Enravota (9th century).

=== Bekker Nunataks ===
64°42′S 60°50′W. Three nunataks lying below Ruth Ridge on the north side of Drygalski Glacier. Mapped from surveys by FIDS (1960–61). Named by UK-APC for Lieutenant Colonel Mieczyslaw G. Bekker, Canadian engineer, author of Theory of Land Locomotion, 1956, a comprehensive source of information on the physical relationship between snow mechanics and track-laying vehicles, skis and sledges.

=== Solari Bay ===
64°44′30″S 60°43′00″W A 11.2 kilometres (7.0 mi) wide bay indenting 4.5 kilometres (2.8 mi) on the Nordenskjöld Coast, north of Balvan Point and south of the east extremity of Richard Knoll. Formed as a result of the break-up of Larsen Ice Shelf in the area in the late 20th century, and subsequent retreat of Drygalski Glacier. Named after the settlement of Solari in Northern Bulgaria.

=== Tillberg Peak ===
64°46′S 60°54′W. A largely ice-free peak, 610 metres (2,000 ft) high, on the ridge running east from Foster Plateau toward Sentinel Nunatak. The name Tillberg was given to a group of four rocky outcrops in this area but, since they are not conspicuous topographically, the UK-APC in 1963 recommended that the name be transferred to this more useful landmark. Named by Doctor Otto Nordenskiöld after Judge Knut Tillberg, contributor to the SwedAE, 1901–04.

=== Sentinel Nunatak ===
64°46′S 60°44′W. A high, black, pyramid-shaped nunatak at the mouth of Drygalski Glacier. Charted by the FIDS in 1947 and so named because of its commanding position at the mouth of Drygalski Glacier.

=== Balvan Point ===
64°47′13″S 60°41′46″W A rocky point on the south side of the entrance to Solari Bay. Situated 4.35 kilometres (2.70 mi) north of Pedersen Nunatak, 2.7 kilometres (1.7 mi) southeast of Sentinel Nunatak, and 10.27 kilometres (6.38 mi) south-southwest of Richard Knoll. Formed as a result of the break-up of Larsen Ice Shelf in the area in the late 20th century. Named after the settlement of Balvan in Northern Bulgaria.

== Sources ==
- Alberts, Fred G., ed. (1995), Geographic Names of the Antarctic (PDF) (2 ed.), United States Board on Geographic Names This article incorporates public domain material from websites or documents of the United States Board on Geographic Names.

REMA Explorer
The Reference Elevation Model of Antarctica (REMA) gives ice surface measurements of most of the continent. When a feature is ice-covered, the ice surface will differ from the underlying rock surface and will change over time. To see ice surface contours and elevation of a feature as of the last REMA update,
- Open the Antarctic REMA Explorer
- Enter the feature's coordinates in the box at the top left that says "Find address or place", then press enter
  The coordinates should be in DMS format, e.g. 65°05'03"S 64°01'02"W. If you only have degrees and minutes, you may not be able to locate the feature.
- Hover over the icons at the left of the screen
- Find "Hillshade" and click on that
  In the bottom right of the screen, set "Shading Factor" to 0 to get a clearer image
- Find "Contour" and click on that
  In the "Contour properties" box, select Contour Interval = 1m
  You can zoom in and out to see the ice surface contours of the feature and nearby features
- Find "Identify" and click on that
  Click the point where the contour lines seem to indicate the top of the feature
  The "Identify" box will appear to the top left. The Orthometric height is the elevation of the ice surface of the feature at this point.

- Antarctic REMA Explorer (Digital Elevation Models created by the Polar Geospatial Center from Maxar imagery), Polar Geospatial Center, University of Minnesota, 2019
- "Balvan Point", Composite Gazetteer of Antarctica, Scientific Committee on Antarctic Research
- "Enravota Glacier", Composite Gazetteer of Antarctica, Scientific Committee on Antarctic Research
- Graham Land and South Shetland Islands, BAS: British Antarctic Survey, 2005
- "Konstantin Buttress", Composite Gazetteer of Antarctica, Scientific Committee on Antarctic Research
- "Molerov Spur", Composite Gazetteer of Antarctica, Scientific Committee on Antarctic Research
- "Odesos Buttress", Composite Gazetteer of Antarctica, Scientific Committee on Antarctic Research
- "Solari Bay", Composite Gazetteer of Antarctica, Scientific Committee on Antarctic Research
- "Stoykite Buttress", Composite Gazetteer of Antarctica, Scientific Committee on Antarctic Research
