= Nordenskjöld Coast =

Coast in Antarctica

- Mountain range
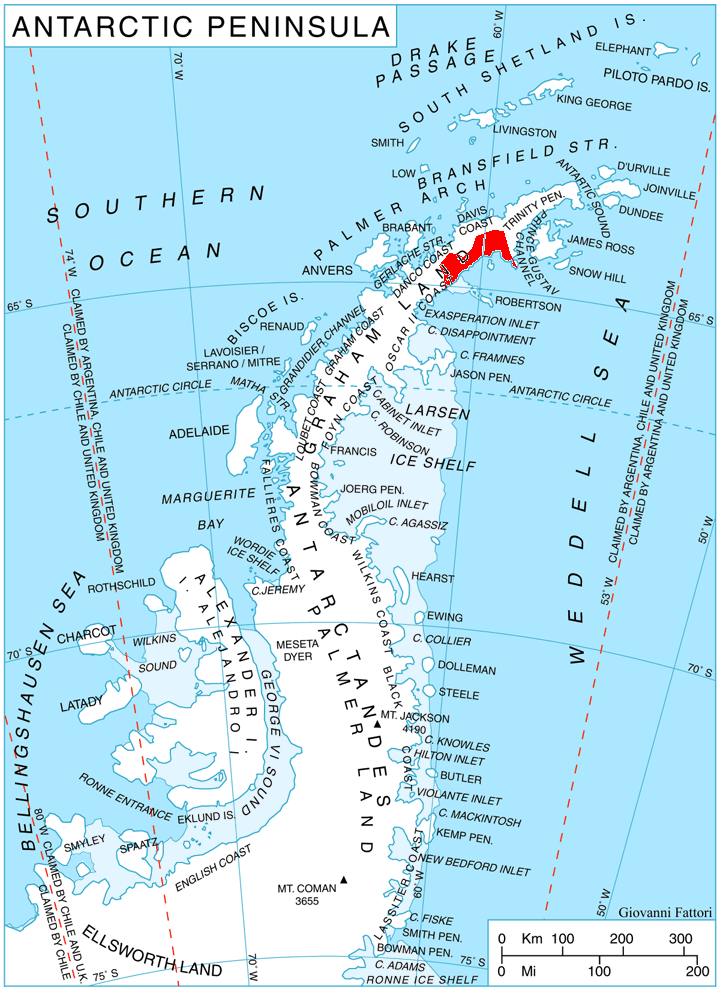
- Interactive map of Nordenskjöld Coast
- Coordinates: 64°30′S 60°30′W
- Location: Antarctic Peninsula
- Geology: Mountain chain

Dimensions
  - Length: 50 m (160 ft)

The Nordenskjöld Coast (64° 30' S 60° 30' W) is located on the Antarctic Peninsula, more specifically Graham Land, which is the top region of the Peninsula. The Peninsula is a thin, long ice sheet with an Alpine-style mountain chain. The coast consists of 15m tall ice cliffs with ice shelves.

The Nordenskjöld Coast was discovered by Otto Nordenskjöld, a Swedish explorer and geographer, and Carl Anton Larsen, a Norwegian explorer and whaler, during the Swedish Antarctic Expedition in 1901–1904. The name was suggested by Edwin Swift Balch in 1909, who was part of the Antarctic Exhibition alongside Dr. Nordenskjöld.

The Nordenskjöld coast extends 50 miles west-southwest from Cape Longing to Drygalski Bay and Cape Fareweather, with Oscar II Coast located to the south. The Nordenskjöld Coast faces the Weddell Sea at the top of the Antarctic continent. The thinness of the Antarctic Peninsula and its northerly location makes it prone to change due to global warming. The length and thickness of the ice sheet connected to the Nordenskjöld coast is monitored to track fluctuating climate patterns. Ice shelves, called the Larsen shelves, found on the eastern side of the peninsula, have decreased significantly in recent years. The Larsen A ice shelf that was extended from the Nordenskjöld Coast disintegrated in 1995. There are now only a few small ice caps remaining along the Nordenskjöld coast.

== Discovery ==
Otto Nordenskjöld and the expedition left Sweden on 16 September 1901 to explore Antarctica and the Antarctic Peninsula. They traveled on a boat called the Antarctic. In 1902 the party spent a month dedicated to sea voyage, then settled on an Island called Snow Hill Island, located off the Trinity Peninsula, next to the Nordenskjöld coast at the top of the Antarctic Peninsula. Due to the harsh weather conditions and the loss of necessary transport, when their boat sunk, the expedition could not explore the coast of the Antarctic Peninsula until springtime in the following September.

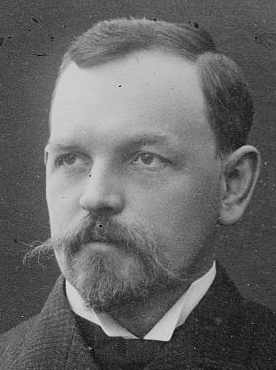
Leader of the 1901-1903 Antarctic expedition

Nordenskjöld found the Antarctic climate to be glacial, compared to continental or maritime. The expedition found new information about the geological makeup of the Antarctic Peninsula, explaining how the landforms were created. The expedition led to the discovery of fossiliferous rocks deposited during the Cretaceous and Tertiary age. It found that the area was a cordilleran belt of folded strata, overlain by sedimentary rocks and volcanic beds from the Mesozoic time. This discovery, during the 1901 expedition, led scientists Dalziel and Elliot (1971,1973) to further amplify the theory of the Pacific crust subduction under the western continental margin.

== Geology ==
The Nordenskjöld coast is located in eastern Graham Land, at the top of the Antarctic Peninsula. The Antarctic Peninsula has undergone intense arc magnetism dating back to Jurassic times. The local basement of the magmatic arc is made of Greywake-shale formations and Metasedimentary sequences, extending to parts of the Trinity Peninsula located next to the Nordenskjöld Coast. Metamorphic rocks can be found at the boundary of the Mesozoic – Cenozoic magmatic arc.

Antarctica used to be part of the supercontinent Gondwana. The Nordenskjöld formation between Cape Longing and Cape Sobral consists of Upper Jurassic-Lower Cretaceous anoxic mudstones and air-fall ashes. There is a possibility of a strike-slip formation based on evidence of deformation, dewatering and lithification. The deformation period was during Tithonian times, and provides further evidence of a plate boundary caused by the break-up of Gondwana along the eastern peninsula. The Nordenskjöld formation went through a significant burial period before the Miocene time which brought on uplifting and block faulting, exposing the area once again.

Between Cape Longing and Cape Sobral, the Nordenskjöld formation is, at its thickest, around 450 cm. It is characterised by ash beds and radiolarian-rich mudstones, around 580m deep. Reports of new calcisphere species, microorganisms that allow scientists to determine time and place in relation to the breakup of Gondwana, found throughout the Nordenskjöld formation, have previously been reported in Indonesia and Argentina. This suggests a connection between both regions and provide information about the Gondwana continent.

== Geography ==
The region of the Nordenskjöld Coast has particularly steep slopes on the coast, with high covered ice plateaus. Cape Sobral lies 12 miles from Cape longing. It is a high plank of rock that is projected above the water below, and is partly snow free. Behind Cape Sobral is a deep fiord that is surrounded by glaciers, which extends to Palmier Peninsula. Larsen Bay, which lies between Cape Sobral and Cape Longing, also has a fiord in the middle of its shoreline. Cape Ruth is an area of high peaks that leads to the eastern entrance of Drygalski Bay. The fiord behind Cape Ruth forms the head of Dryglaski Bay.

There is evidence of a plate-boundary on the eastern margin of the peninsula during the breakup of Gondwana. A strike-slip formation found by Whitham and Storey in 1989 proves the placement of this boundary as well as the spreading of the Weddell Sea Region, off the Antarctic Peninsula, and the change from fine anoxic to coarse clastic sedimentation.

The Antarctic Peninsula was an active volcanic arc between the Late Jurassic and Tertiary period, created from the south-eastward subduction of the Panthalassa crust, the super ocean that surrounded the supercontinent of Pangaea. The finding from Potassium-argon or K-Ar dating, which measures the product of the radioactive decay of an isotope to determine the time period, from the Schists that line the Nordenskjöld Coast has found that a metamorphic event, a process of heating and cooling sediments which ultimately changes their composition, happened around the Permian times, estimating its peak at 245-250 Ma.

== Climate and climate change ==
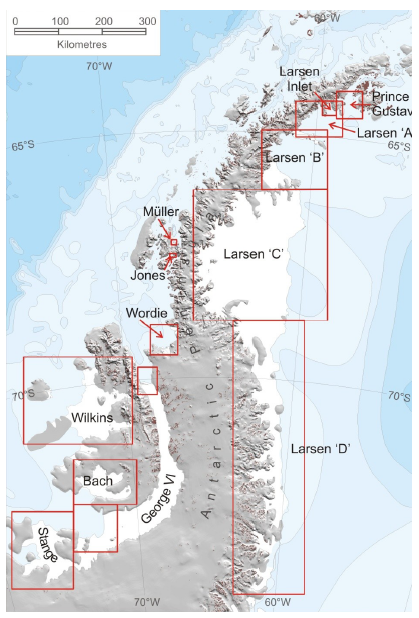
Overview of the Larsen ice caps on the Antarctic Peninsula

The climate of the Nordenskjöld Coast is an ice cap climate, which means that all 12 months of the year average a temperature below 0 °C. Along the Antarctic Peninsula over the past 50 years the mean temperature has increased by 3.4 degrees Celsius and the mid winter temperature by 6 degrees. This makes the Antarctic region one of the global hotspots for climate change.

Due to the steep mountains that line the Antarctic Peninsula, the south-west winds are cold and strong. First noted in the Swedish Expedition in 1902, Otto Nordenskjöld found that these winds are present along the entire coast of the Peninsula. These strong, cold winds are due to the semi-permanent Weddell Sea pressure cell. The Weddell Sea is one of the coldest masses in the ocean. This tends to build up in this area due to the damming-up effect against the high slopes on the eastern side of the Antarctic Peninsula. The coast experiences a barrier effect of winds in response to the mountains blocking its path. This effect means wind speed can accelerate to gale force. During the 1902 expedition they recorded speeds of hurricane force.

The changes in ice shelf mass along the coast of the Peninsula, including the Nordenskjöld Coast, have been accelerated by the change in circumpolar currents. The warmer temperatures contributed to the disintegration of the ice sheet along the Antarctic Peninsula. The melting of the Larsen Ice Shelf has contributed to ocean mass; the Larsen A and B ice shelves that fell in 1995 and 2002 were of considerable mass.

The Northern area of the Antarctic Peninsula, including the Nordenskjöld Coast, Trinity Peninsula and the off-laying islands, are particularly vulnerable to varying climatic gradients. The Nordenskjöld Coast experiences low levels of rain, and yearly snowfall. Humidity can reach high levels, with temperatures above freezing.

Permafrost (permanent frozen ground) and seasonal thaw-activity are the main indicators of climate change. There is a correlation between the mean annual temperatures of the arctic and the boundaries of permafrost on the Antarctic Peninsula, meaning that rising temperatures impact the mass of permafrost. Permafrost can survive if the mean annual temperature remains − 2.5 °C. Due to global warming, permafrost levels have become unstable, and there is a historic degradation of permafrost levels all over Antarctica.

== Ice caps ==
Ice shelves are permanent floating ice sheets that are extended from the Antarctic land masses. They are made from the slow buildup of ice, growing into larger bodies of ice. The Antarctic Peninsula has numerous ice shelves called the Larsen A, B and C. The Larsen C ice shelf at the southern end of the Antarctic Peninsula remains the most intact to this day. The flow of grounded ice into the Antarctic Ocean is regulated by the ice shelves.

Scientists can enhance the processes that control the way atmospheric changes affect the ice shelves. With satellite altimeter studies, which records the density and surface lowering of ice shelves, they can better understand the loss of mass on the shelves. This allows ocean divers and other scientists to better estimate the sea level changes.

The Larsen A ice shelf is an extension of the Nordenskjold Coast; Larsen B is located to the south. The Larsen A ice shelf experienced a major disintegration in 1995, which triggered the collapse of the Larsen B ice shelf in 2002. This then triggered an acceleration of the flow from outlet glaciers feeding into the ice shelves, accounting for the continuous loss in mass. Larsen A ice shelf is a narrow strip of floating ice between the Nordenskjöld Coast and Seal Nunatuks. There are smaller ice shelves along the Nordenskjöld coast and further south which have since remained intact. The ice shelves remain in four basins along the coast: Dryglaski, Edgeworth, Pyke and Sjögren. All of them are losing mass except for the Pyke Glacier. The ice shelf collapse in 2002 triggered a perturbation of a massive accelerated flow. The instability of the ice shelves' mass can be traced back to changes in climate. The Larsen B ice shelf has contributed to 17% of the mass depletion rate of the Antarctic Peninsula. The decline in mass from the Larsen A and Larsen B ice shelves have contributed to sea ice, atmosphere and ocean changes. With temperatures changing, so do the ice shelves; accelerated melting occurs, subsequently changing ocean masses and temperatures.
