= Valkosel Ridge =

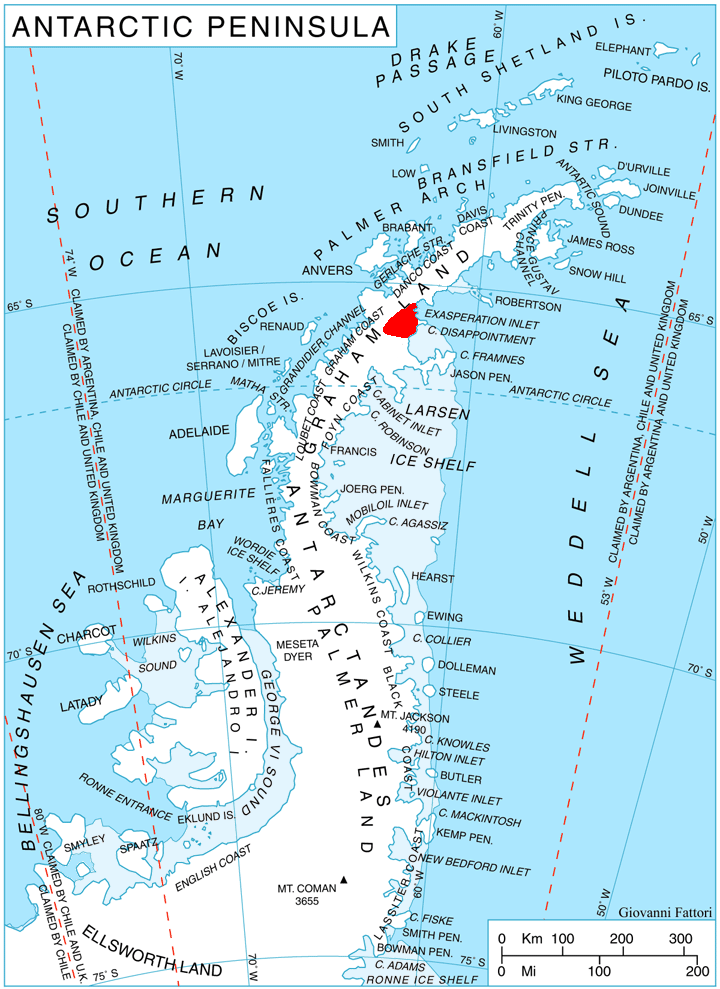
Location of Aristotle Mountains on the Antarctic Peninsula.

Valkosel Ridge (Bulgarian: хребет Вълкосел, ‘Hrebet Valkosel’ \'hre-bet v&l-ko-'sel\) is the narrow rocky ridge extending 8.8 km in north–south direction and 1.6 km wide, rising to 1046 m in Aristotle Mountains on Oscar II Coast in Graham Land. It is situated in the south foothills of Mount Sara Teodora, surmounting Belogradchik Glacier to the west, Ambergris Glacier to the east, and Flask Glacier to the south. The feature is named after the settlement of Valkosel in Southwestern Bulgaria.

== Location ==
Valkosel Ridge is located at 65°42′22″S 62°39′33″W, which is 5.29 km south-southwest of the summit point of Mount Sara Teodora, 4.73 km west of Chintulov Ridge, 11.71 km north of Bildad Peak, and 8.06 km east-northeast of Mount Fedallah. British mapping in 1976.

== Maps ==
- British Antarctic Territory. Scale 1:200000 topographic map. DOS 610 Series, Sheet W 65 62. Directorate of Overseas Surveys, Tolworth, UK, 1976.
- Antarctic Digital Database (ADD). Scale 1:250000 topographic map of Antarctica. Scientific Committee on Antarctic Research (SCAR). Since 1993, regularly upgraded and updated.
