= Mount Rorqual =

Mountain in Graham Land, Antarctica

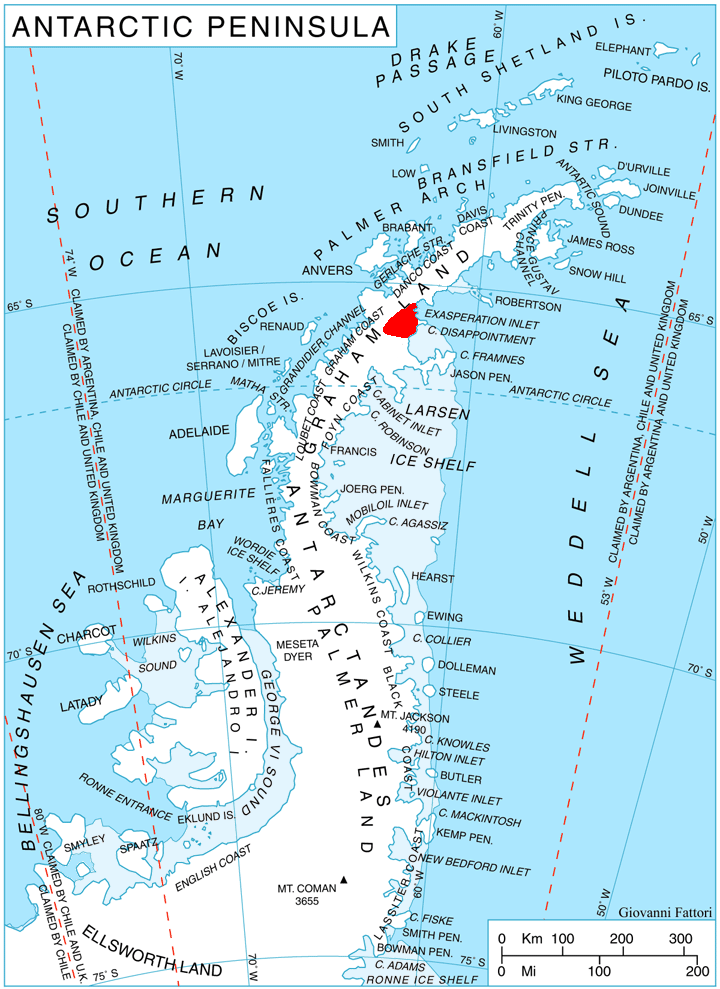
Location of Aristotle Mountains on the Antarctic Peninsula.

Mount Rorqual (65°39′S 62°20′W) is a peak between Starbuck and Stubb Glaciers in southeastern Aristotle Mountains, 5 nautical miles (9 km) west of Mount Queequeg, on the east side of Graham Land. The feature is rocky and precipitous, rises to 1,110 m and is separated from Cachalot Peak by a narrow ridge. The name is one of a group in the area applied by United Kingdom Antarctic Place-Names Committee (UK-APC) that reflects a whaling theme, the Rorquals being a species of baleen whales.
