= Mount Sara Teodora =

Mountain in Graham Land, Antarctica

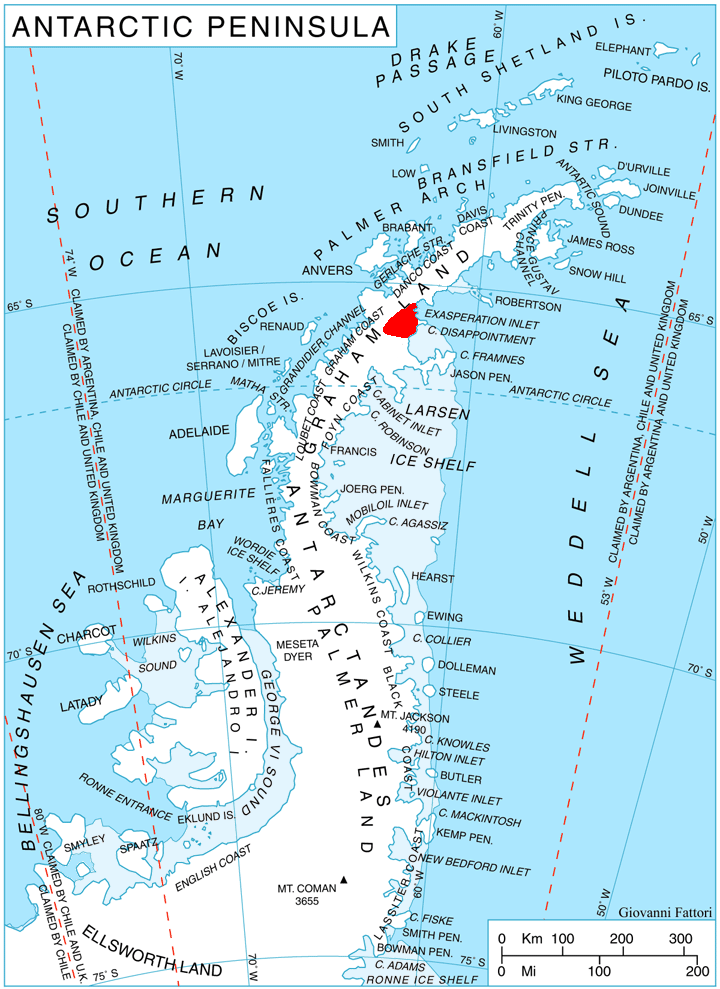
Location of Aristotle Mountains on the Antarctic Peninsula.

Mount Sara Teodora (Bulgarian: връх Сара Теодора, romanized: vrah Sara Teodora, IPA: [ˈvrɤx ˈsarɐ tɛoˈdɔrɐ]) is the broad ice-covered peak rising to 1389 m in Aristotle Mountains on Oscar II Coast in Graham Land. It is situated in the southeast foothills of Madrid Dome, with its ice cap draining towards Starbuck Glacier to the northeast, Stubb Glacier to the east, Ambergris Glacier to the south, and Belogradchik Glacier to the southwest. The lower rocky ridges of Pippin Peaks, Chintulov and Valkosel spread out to the east-northeast, southeast and south direction respectively.

The feature is named after the Bulgarian queen Sara Teodora, 1349–1371.

== Location ==
Mount Sara Teodora is located at 65°39′45″S 62°36′50″W, which is 15.55 km southeast of the summit point of Madrid Dome, 12.6 km southwest of Mount Mayhew, and 10.56 km northwest of Hitrino Ridge. British mapping in 1976.

== Maps ==
- British Antarctic Territory. Scale 1:200000 topographic map. DOS 610 Series, Sheet W 65 62. Directorate of Overseas Surveys, Tolworth, UK, 1976.
- Antarctic Digital Database (ADD). Scale 1:250000 topographic map of Antarctica. Scientific Committee on Antarctic Research (SCAR), 1993–2016.
