= Mihaylovski Crag =

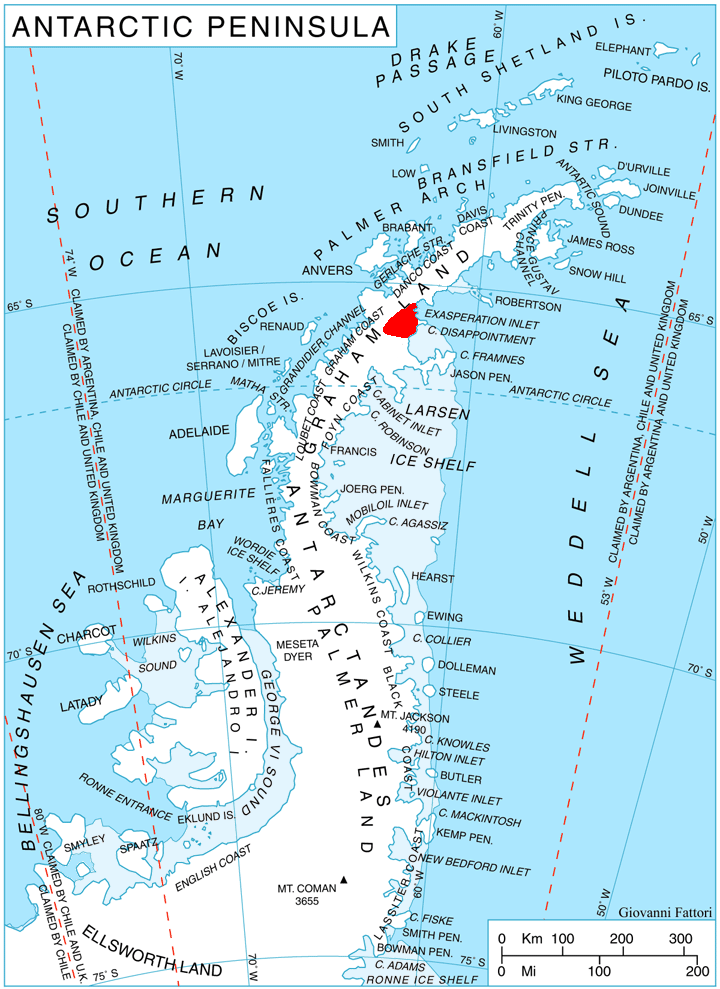
Location of Aristotle Mountains on the Antarctic Peninsula.

Mihaylovski Crag (Bulgarian: Михайловски камък, ‘Mihaylovski Kamak’ \mi-hay-'lov-ski 'ka-m&k\) is the narrow rocky hill extending 3.8 km in west-northwest to east-southeast direction, 530 m wide, and rising to 317 m in its main part and 329 m at its west extremity, on the north side of the terminus of Rachel Glacier and on the southeast side of Krupen Ridge in eastern Aristotle Mountains on Oscar II Coast in Graham Land. The feature is named after the Bulgarian writer Stoyan Mihaylovski (1856-1927), in connection with the eponymous settlement in Northeastern Bulgaria.

== Location ==
Mihaylovski Crag is located at 65°35′00″S 62°01′56″W, which is 10.4 km south-southwest of Sandilh Point, 8.4 km north-northeast of Mount Queequeg, and 6.9 km east-northeast of Mount Baleen. British mapping in 1976.

== Maps ==
- British Antarctic Territory. Scale 1:200000 topographic map. DOS 610 Series, Sheet W 65 62. Directorate of Overseas Surveys, Tolworth, UK, 1976.
- Antarctic Digital Database (ADD). Scale 1:250000 topographic map of Antarctica. Scientific Committee on Antarctic Research (SCAR). Since 1993, regularly upgraded and updated.
