= Chintulov Ridge =

Rocky ridge in Antarctica

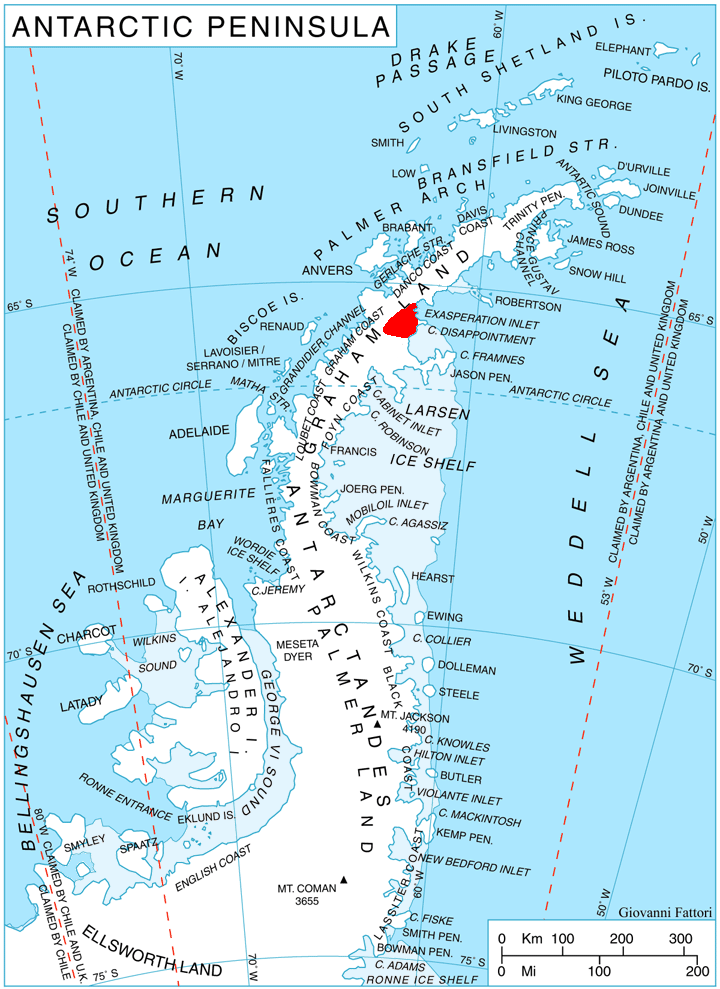
Location of Aristotle Mountains on the Antarctic Peninsula.

Chintulov Ridge (Bulgarian: Чинтулов хребет, ‘Chintulov Hrebet’ \'chin-tu-lov 'hre-bet\) is the rocky ridge extending 6.9 km in north-northwest to south-southeast direction and 2.6 km wide, rising to 1145 m in Aristotle Mountains on Oscar II Coast in Graham Land. It is situated in the southeast foothills of Mount Sara Teodora, surmounting Ambergris Glacier to the west, and Flask Glacier and one of its tributaries to the south and east respectively. The feature is named after the Bulgarian poet Dobri Chintulov (1822-1886), in connection with the settlement Chintulovo in Southeastern Bulgaria.

== Location ==
Chintulov Ridge is located at 65°42′31″S 62°33′23″W, which is 5.78 km south-southeast of the summit point of Mount Sara Teodora, 5.07 km northwest of Hitrino Ridge, 11.46 km north of Bildad Peak, and 12.58 km east-northeast of Mount Fedallah. British mapping in 1976.

== Maps ==
- British Antarctic Territory. Scale 1:200000 topographic map. DOS 610 Series, Sheet W 65 62. Directorate of Overseas Surveys, Tolworth, UK, 1976.
- Antarctic Digital Database (ADD). Scale 1:250000 topographic map of Antarctica. Scientific Committee on Antarctic Research (SCAR). Since 1993, regularly upgraded and updated.
