= Hitrino Ridge =

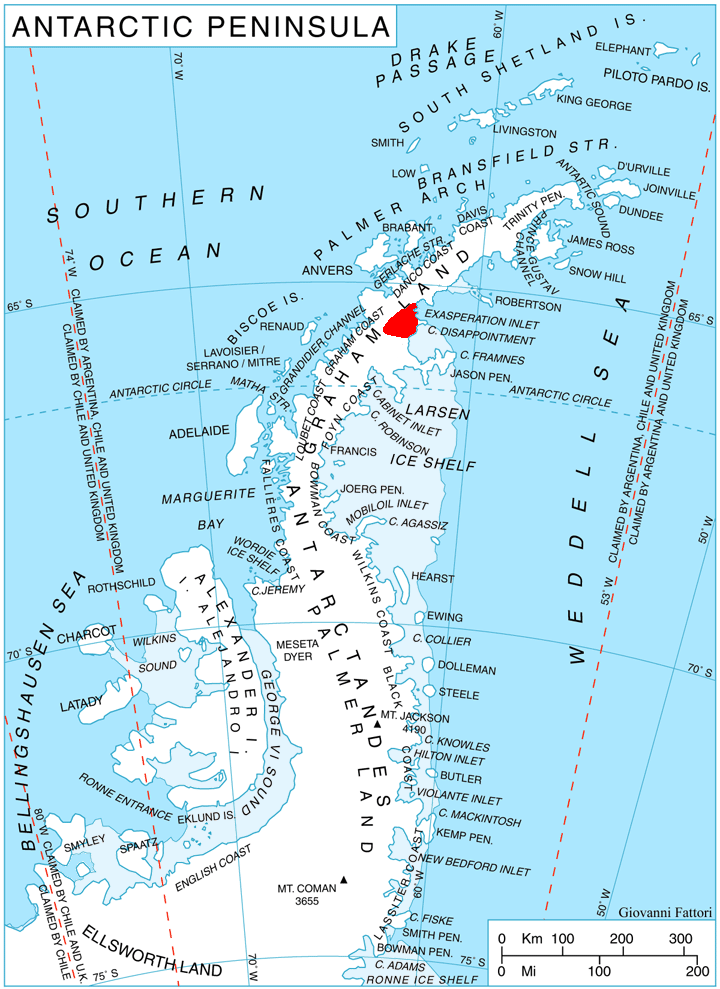
Location of Aristotle Mountains on the Antarctic Peninsula.

Hitrino Ridge (Bulgarian: рид Хитрино, ‘Rid Hitrino’ \'rid 'hi-tri-no\) is the rocky ridge extending 3.5 km in northwest-southeast direction and 2.8 km in northeast-southwest direction, rising to 805 m between two southeastwards flowing tributaries to Flask Glacier in Aristotle Mountains on Oscar II Coast in Graham Land. The feature is named after the settlement of Hitrino in Northeastern Bulgaria.

== Location ==
Hitrino Ridge is located at 65°44′08″S 62°28′03″W, which is 10.56 km southeast of Mount Sara Teodora, 6.4 km west-northwest of Daggoo Peak, and 2.4 km north of Fluke Ridge. British mapping in 1976.

== Maps ==
- British Antarctic Territory. Scale 1:200000 topographic map. DOS 610 Series, Sheet W 65 62. Directorate of Overseas Surveys, Tolworth, UK, 1976.
- Antarctic Digital Database (ADD). Scale 1:250000 topographic map of Antarctica. Scientific Committee on Antarctic Research (SCAR). Since 1993, regularly upgraded and updated.
