= Cachalot (disambiguation) =

The sperm whale, or common cachalot, is a large toothed whale belonging to the infraorder Cetacea.

Cachalot may also refer to:

- Cachalot (novel), a 1980 science fiction novel written by Alan Dean Foster
- Cachalot-class submarine, a pair of medium-sized submarines of the United States Navy
- USS Cachalot
- HMS Cachalot
- Camp Cachalot, Myles Standish State Forest near Plymouth, Massachusetts
- Cachalot Peak, Graham Land, Antarctic Peninsula
