= Belogradchik Glacier =

Glacier in Antarctica

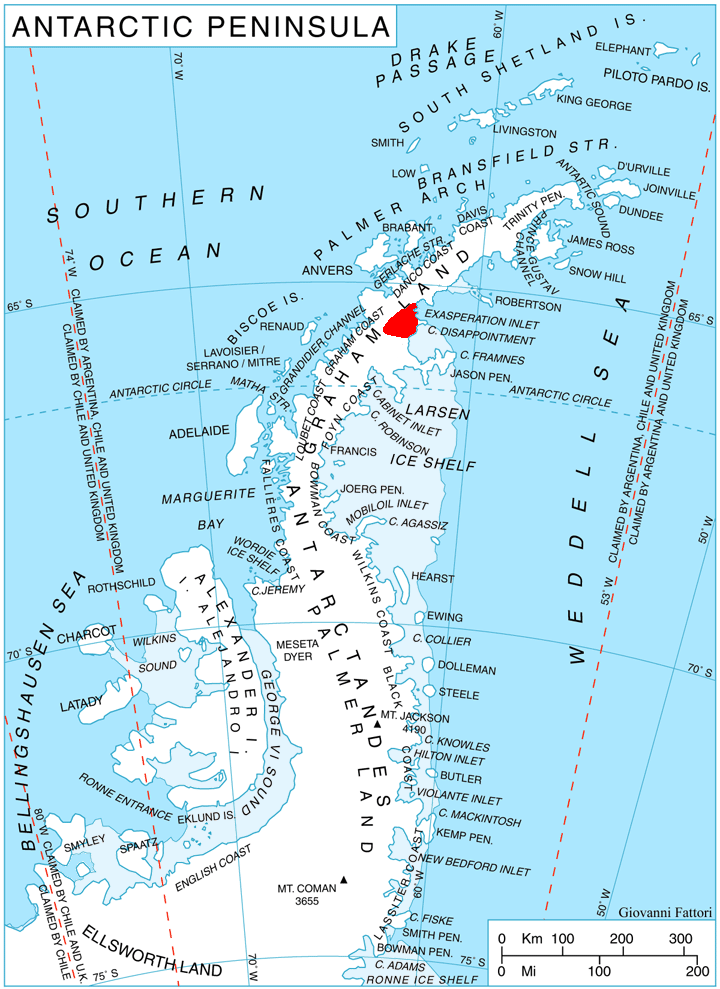
- Location of Aristotle Mountains on the Antarctic Peninsula

- Location within Antarctica
- Location: Graham Land
- Coordinates: 65°41′30″S 62°42′30″W
- Length: 7 nmi (13 km; 8 mi)
- Width: 3 nmi (6 km; 3 mi)
- Thickness: unknown
- Terminus: Flask Glacier
- Status: unknown

Belogradchik Glacier (Bulgarian: ледник Белоградчик, romanized: lednik Belogradchik, IPA: [ˈlɛdniɡ bɛɫoɡrɐtˈt͡ʃik]) is a 14 km long and 5.6 km wide glacier in the southern Aristotle Mountains on Oscar II Coast in Graham Land, Antarctica, situated south of Jeroboam Glacier and west of Ambergris Glacier. It drains from the southeast slopes of Madrid Dome and flows southeastwards to join Flask Glacier east of Mount Fedallah.

The feature is named after the town of Belogradchik in northwestern Bulgaria.

== Location ==
Belogradchik Glacier is located at 65°41′30″S 62°42′30″W. It was mapped by the British in 1976.

== See also ==
- List of glaciers in the Antarctic
- Glaciology

== Maps ==
- Antarctic Digital Database (ADD). Scale 1:250000 topographic map of Antarctica. Scientific Committee on Antarctic Research (SCAR). Since 1993, regularly upgraded and updated.
