= Mount Baleen =

Mountain in Graham Land, Antarctica

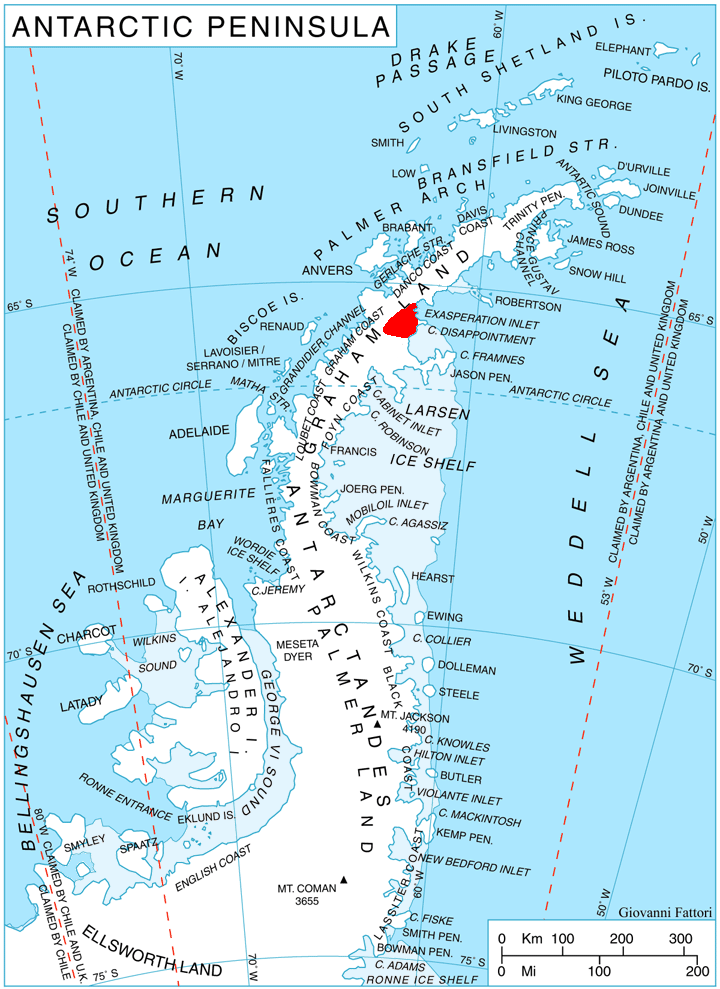
Location of Aristotle Mountains on the Antarctic Peninsula.

Mount Baleen (65°36′S 62°12′W) is a prominent peak of 910 m and of pyramidal shape when viewed from Larsen Ice Shelf, standing in Padesh Ridge between Rachel and Starbuck Glaciers in Aristotle Mountains on the east coast of Graham Land. The naming by United Kingdom Antarctic Place-Names Committee (UK-APC) is one in a group in this vicinity that reflects a whaling theme. Baleen whales are distinguished by the presence of a sieve of horny baleen (whalebone) plates suspended from the upper jaw, and by the absence of teeth.
