= Pip Cliffs =

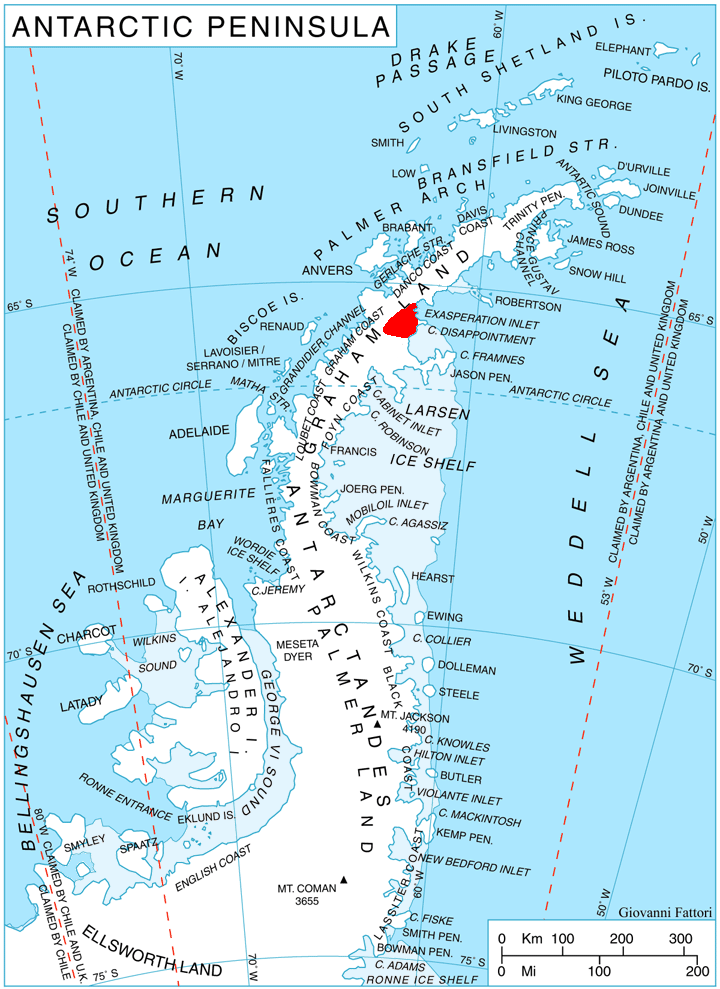
Location of Aristotle Mountains on the Antarctic Peninsula.

Pip Cliffs (65°43′S 63°1′W) is a prominent rock cliffs, rising to about 1,250 m in southwestern Aristotle Mountains, 10 km west of Mount Fedallah and 3.5 km east of Peychinov Crag, on the north side of Flask Glacier on Oscar II Coast, Graham Land. In association with names from Melville's Moby Dick grouped in this area, named by United Kingdom Antarctic Place-Names Committee (UK-APC) in 1987 after Pip, the cabin boy of the Pequod.
