= Jeroboam Glacier =

Glacier in Graham Land, Antarctica

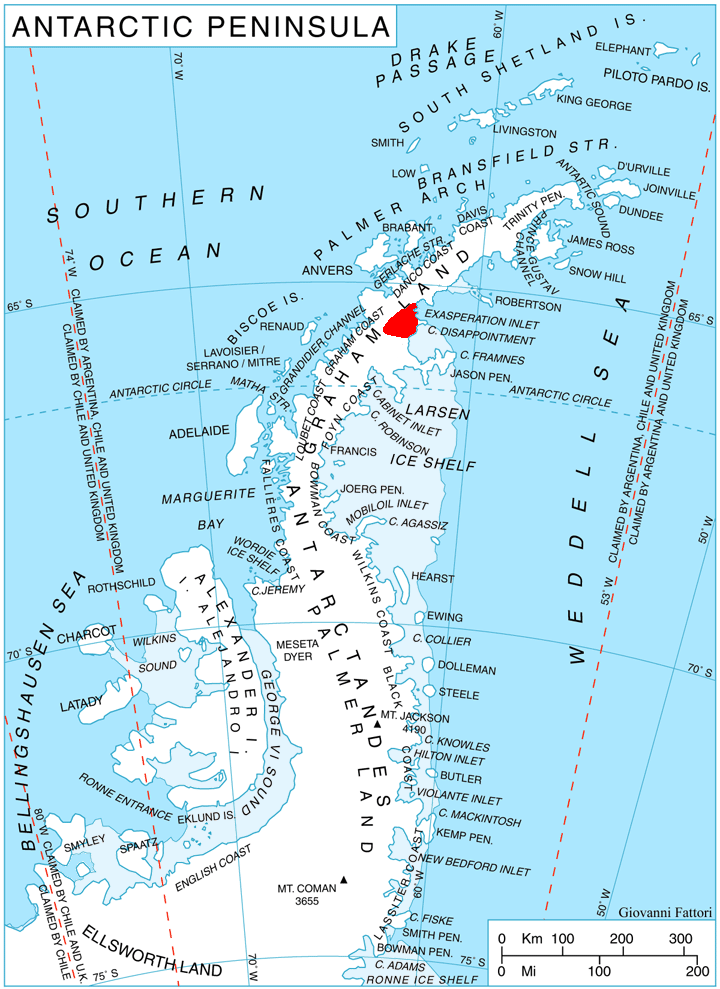
Location of Aristotle Mountains on the Antarctic Peninsula.

Jeroboam Glacier (65°38′S 62°40′W) is a southwestern tributary glacier in the north foothills of Mount Sara Teodora that joins Starbuck Glacier just east of Gabriel Peak in Aristotle Mountains, on the east side of Graham Land, Antarctica. The toponym is one of several in the vicinity applied by the UK Antarctic Place-Names Committee from Herman Melville's Moby-Dick, the Jeroboam being the ship that met the Pequod.
