= Peychinov Crag =

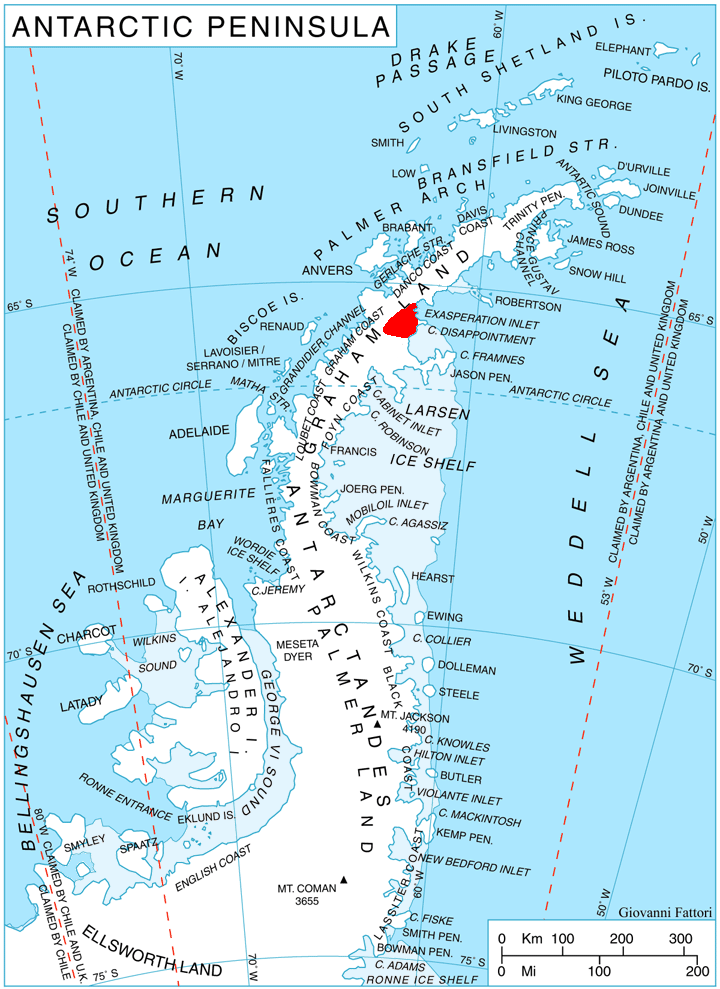
Location of Aristotle Mountains on the Antarctic Peninsula.

Peychinov Crag (Bulgarian: Пейчинов камък, ‘Peychinov Kamak’ \pey-'chi-nov 'ka-m&k\) is the narrow rocky nunatak extending 3.58 km in northwest-southeast direction and 700 m wide, rising to 1417 m in the southwest foothills of Aristotle Mountains on Oscar II Coast in Graham Land. It is situated in upper Flask Glacier. The feature is named after the settlement of Peychinovo in Northeastern Bulgaria, in connection with the Bulgarian scholar and enlightener Kiril Peychinovich (1770–1845).

== Location ==
Peychinov Crag is located at 65°42′38″S 63°08′12″W, which is 8.15 km southeast of Ushi Cliffs, 12.6 km southwest of Madrid Dome, 14.38 km west of Mount Fedallah, and 11.45 km north-northeast of Mount Zadruga. British mapping in 1976.

== Maps ==
- British Antarctic Territory. Scale 1:200000 topographic map. DOS 610 Series, Sheet W 65 62. Directorate of Overseas Surveys, Tolworth, UK, 1976.
- Antarctic Digital Database (ADD). Scale 1:250000 topographic map of Antarctica. Scientific Committee on Antarctic Research (SCAR). Since 1993, regularly upgraded and updated.

== Bibliography ==
- Peychinov Crag. SCAR Composite Antarctic Gazetteer.
- Bulgarian Antarctic Gazetteer. Antarctic Place-names Commission. (details in Bulgarian, basic data in English)
