= Cachalot Peak =

Peak in the Aristotle Mountains, Antarctica

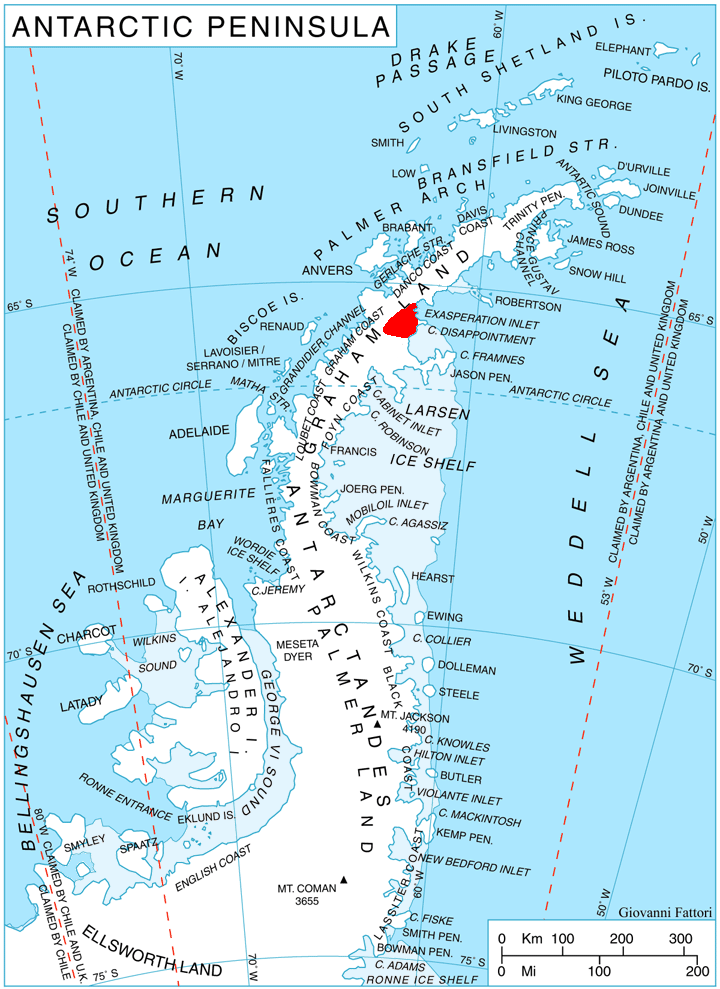
Location of Aristotle Mountains on the Antarctic Peninsula

Cachalot Peak (65°38′S 62°16′W) is a peak, 1,040 metres (3,400 ft) high, between Stubb Glacier and Starbuck Glacier in southeastern Aristotle Mountains, about 3.5 nautical miles (6 km) west of Mount Queequeg, near the east coast of Graham Land. The toponym is one in a group by the UK Antarctic Place-Names Committee that reflects a whaling theme, "cachalot" being the sperm whale.
