= Ushi Cliffs =

Cliffs in Antarctica

Location of Oscar II Coast on Antarctic Peninsula.

Ushi Cliffs (Bulgarian: скат Уши, ‘Skat Ushi’ \'skat u-'shi\) are the precipitous rocky cliffs extending 2.7 km in northwest-southeast direction and 600 m wide, rising to 1500 m on Oscar II Coast in Graham Land. They are situated in the south foothills of Roundel Dome, surmounting upper Flask Glacier to the south. Named after the settlement of Ushi in Western Bulgaria.

== Location ==
Ushi Cliffs are located at 65°39′50″S 63°16′25″W, which is 18.6 km south-southwest of Madrid Dome, 8.15 km northwest of Peychinov Crag, and 20 km east-southeast of Mount Rouge on Graham Coast. British mapping in 1976.

== Maps ==
- British Antarctic Territory. Scale 1:200000 topographic map. DOS 610 Series, Sheet W 65 62. Directorate of Overseas Surveys, Tolworth, UK, 1976.
- Antarctic Digital Database (ADD). Scale 1:250000 topographic map of Antarctica. Scientific Committee on Antarctic Research (SCAR). Since 1993, regularly upgraded and updated.
