= World Park Base =

World Park Station
- Antarctic research station
- Base resupply

- Location in Antarctica
- Coordinates: 77°38′05″S 166°25′20″E
- Region: Ross Island
- Location: Cape Evans
- Established: January 1987
- Dismantled: 1992

Government
  - Type: Administration
  - Body: Greenpeace
- Active times: All year-round

World Park Base was a non-governmental year-round Antarctic base located at Cape Evans on Ross Island in the Ross Dependency. It was the only non-government Antarctic base.

The international environmental organization Greenpeace established World Park Base in 1987 to give Greenpeace the right to attend Antarctic Treaty meetings, to seek allies for its aim to amend the treaty to block mineral extraction and to declare the continent as a World Park. A treaty, the Convention on the Regulation of Antarctic Mineral Resource Activities, had been under consideration to enable mining but failed to receive the required support by 25 November 1989.

Greenpeace and others wanted to make the entire continent off-limits to commercial exploitation and pollution, and permit only limited scientific research. Greenpeace closed the base down in 1991 and completely dismantled the base in 1992.

Ultimately the Protocol on Environmental Protection to the Antarctic Treaty was agreed in 1991 and came into force in 1998, ratified by all the Antarctic Treaty consultative parties, designating Antarctica as a "natural reserve, devoted to peace and science".

The official attitude amongst the Antarctic Treaty nations was that World Park Base was to be ignored and that no assistance be given to it, although New Zealand, which claims jurisdiction over Ross Dependency (though all territorial claims are in abeyance under the Antarctic Treaty), would have assisted if a life-threatening situation arose.

== See also ==
- List of inactive Antarctic research stations
- List of Antarctic field camps
- Antarctic and Southern Ocean Coalition
- Cousteau Society
