= Ambergris Glacier =

Glacier in Antarctica

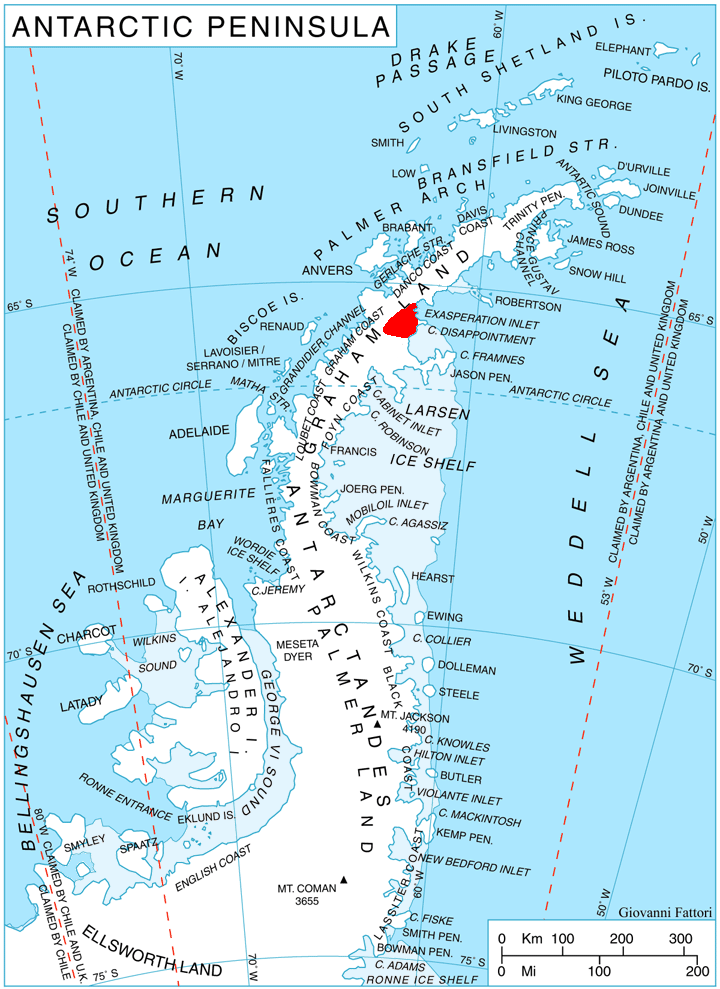
- Location of Aristotle Mountains on the Antarctic Peninsula

- Location within Antarctica
- Location: Graham Land
- Coordinates: 65°43′S 62°37′W
- Thickness: unknown
- Highest elevation: 557 m (1,827 ft)
- Terminus: Flask Glacier
- Status: unknown

Ambergris Glacier (65°43′S 62°37′W) is a glacier flowing south-southeast from Mount Sara Teodora, between Chintulov Ridge and Valkosel Ridge, to join Flask Glacier just west of Fluke Ridge in Aristotle Mountains on the east coast of Graham Land, Antarctica. One of several names in the area that reflect a whaling theme, it was named in 1987 by the United Kingdom Antarctic Place-Names Committee from the substance secreted by the sperm whale and used in perfumery.

== See also ==
- List of glaciers in the Antarctic
- Glaciology
