= Madrid Agreement (disambiguation) =

Madrid Agreement can refer to:

- Madrid system, the international system to facilitate the registration of trademarks
- Madrid Accords, a 1975 treaty to end the Spanish presence in Spanish Sahara
- Protocol on Environmental Protection to the Antarctic Treaty, or the Madrid Protocol, part of the Antarctic Treaty System
