= Mount Mayhew =

Mountain in Graham Land, Antarctica

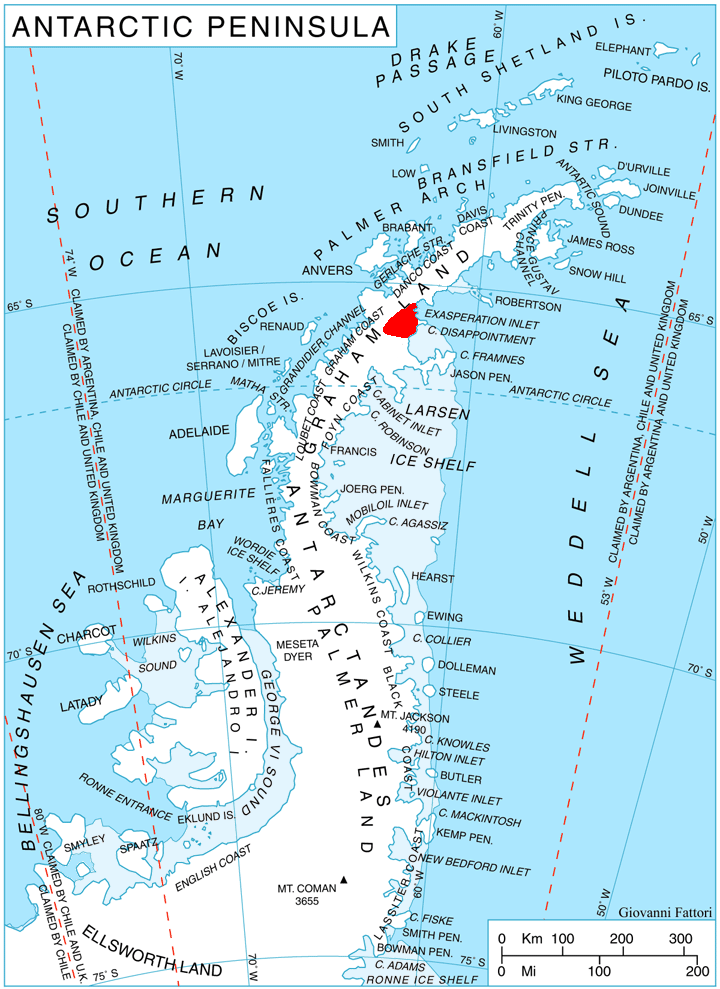
Location of Aristotle Mountains on the Antarctic Peninsula.

Mount Mayhew (65°35′S 62°26′W) is a peak rising to 1,200 metres (4,000 ft) in Taridin Ridge, between Pequod Glacier and Starbuck Glacier, in the Aristotle Mountains on the east side of Graham Land, Antarctica. The southwest face of the peak is rocky and very steep, while the northeast face is snow-covered. The name is one of several in the vicinity applied by the UK Antarctic Place-Names Committee from Herman Melville's Moby-Dick, Mayhew being the captain of the Jeroboam.

== Geographical Name Data for Mayhew, Mount in Antarctica ==
The geographical name data for Mayhew, Mount in Antarctica, as supplied by the US military intelligence in electronic format, including the geographic coordinates and place name in various forms, Latin, roman and native characters, and its location in its respective country's administrative division.

=== Feature ===
Name : Mayhew, Mount

Feature Class: Summit

Country Code: AQ (Antarctica)

Feature ID : 9610

Primary Latitude in degrees, minutes, and seconds (see definition): 65° 35' 00" S

Primary Longitude in degrees, minutes, and seconds (see definition): 062° 26' 00" W

Primary Latitude in decimal degrees: -65.5833333

Primary Longitude in decimal degrees : -62.4333333

Elevation: 1200

Decision Year : 01/01/1976

Description (see definition): A peak, 1,200 m, between Pequod and Starbuck Glaciers on the E side of Graham Land. The SW face of the peak is rocky and very steep, while the NE face is snow-covered. The name is one of several in the vicinity applied by UK Antarctic Place-names Committee (UK-APC) from Herman Melville's Moby Dick, Mayhew being the captain of the Jeroboam.
