= Chuchuliga Glacier =

Glacier in Antarctica

- Location of Oscar II Coast on Antarctic Peninsula

- Location within Antarctica
- Location: Graham Land
- Coordinates: 65°21′30″S 62°55′30″W
- Length: 7 nmi (13 km; 8 mi)
- Width: 6 nmi (11 km; 7 mi)
- Thickness: unknown
- Terminus: Crane Glacier
- Status: unknown

Chuchuliga Glacier (Bulgarian: ледник Чучулига, romanized: lednik Chuchuliga, IPA: [ˈlɛdnik t͡ʃot͡ʃoˈliɡɐ]) is the 14 km long and 12 km wide glacier on Oscar II Coast, Graham Land in Antarctica situated southwest of Dzhebel Glacier, northeast of Stob Glacier and south-southeast of Archer Glacier. It is draining from the slopes of Bruce Plateau, and flowing south-southeastwards to join Crane Glacier.

The feature is named after the settlement of Chuchuliga in southern Bulgaria.

== Location ==
Chuchuliga Glacier is located at 65°21′30″S 62°55′30″W. British mapping in 1974.

== See also ==
- List of glaciers in the Antarctic
- Glaciology

== Maps ==
- Antarctic Digital Database (ADD). Scale 1:250000 topographic map of Antarctica. Scientific Committee on Antarctic Research (SCAR). Since 1993, regularly upgraded and updated.
