= Pippin Peaks =

Mountains in Antarctica

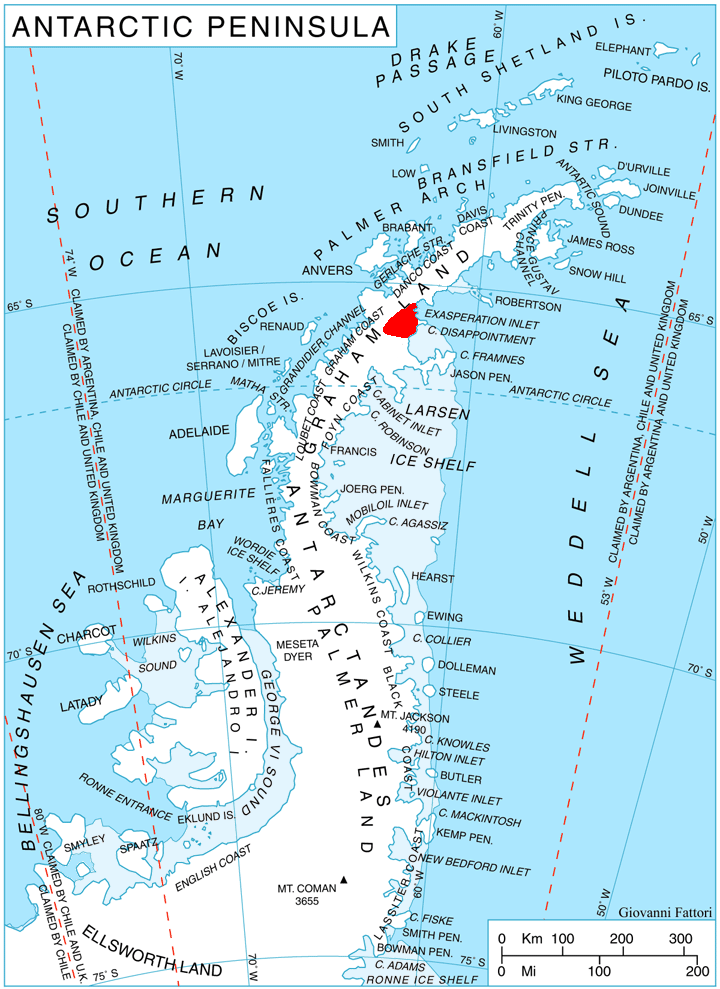
Location of Aristotle Mountains on the Antarctic Peninsula.

Pippin Peaks (65°39′S 62°28′W) is an east-west line of several Antarctic peaks ranging in height from 880 m to 1,160 m and formed of white or pink granite. The feature is situated in the southern Aristotle Mountains, at the west end of Stubb Glacier where it forms a part of the glacier's north wall, and is connected to Mount Sara Teodora to the west-southwest.

The name is one of several in this area applied by United Kingdom Antarctic Place-Names Committee (UK-APC) from Herman Melville's Moby Dick, Pippin being the shipkeeper in the Pequod who was cast adrift by Stubb.
