= Gabriel Peak =

Gabriel Peak may refer to:

- Gabriel Peak (Antarctica)
- Gabriel Peak (Washington)
