= Taridin Ridge =

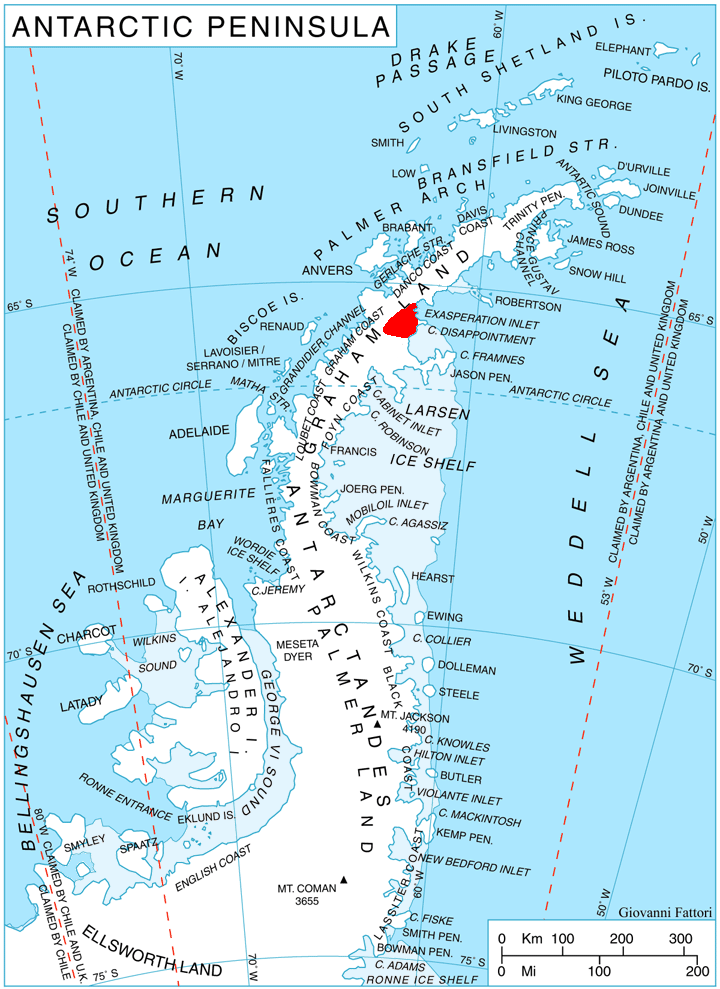
Location of Aristotle Mountains on the Antarctic Peninsula.

Taridin Ridge (Bulgarian: хребет Таридин, ‘Hrebet Taridin’ \'hre-bet ta-ri-'din\) is the rocky Y-shaped ridge extending 20 km in east-west direction, 7.15 km wide, and rising to 1379 m (Mount Mayhew) in central Aristotle Mountains on Oscar II Coast in Graham Land. It surmounts Pequod Glacier to the north and Starbuck Glacier to the south. The feature is named after Taridin, governor in Southwestern Bulgaria under Czar Boris I and Czar Simeon I (9th-10th century).

== Location ==
Taridin Ridge is located at 65°33′07″S 62°30′13″W. British mapping in 1976.

== Maps ==
- British Antarctic Territory. Scale 1:200000 topographic map. DOS 610 Series, Sheet W 65 62. Directorate of Overseas Surveys, Tolworth, UK, 1976.
- Antarctic Digital Database (ADD). Scale 1:250000 topographic map of Antarctica. Scientific Committee on Antarctic Research (SCAR). Since 1993, regularly upgraded and updated.
