= Gabriel Peak (Antarctica) =

Mountain in Antarctica

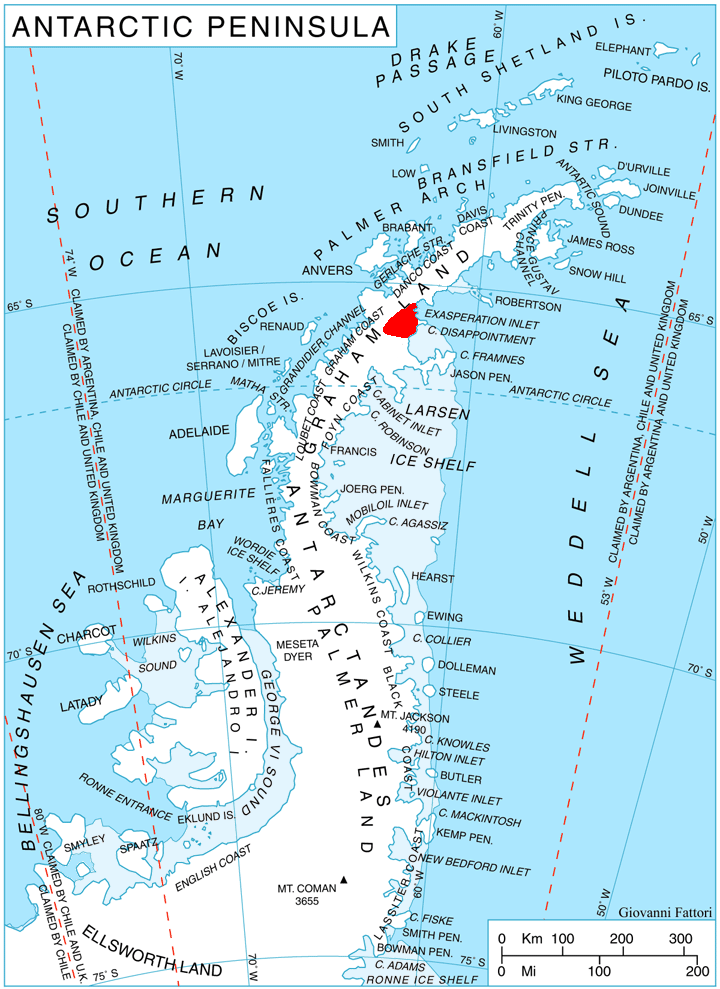
Location of Aristotle Mountains on the Antarctic Peninsula.

Gabriel Peak (65°36′S 62°39′W) is a peak, 1,220 metres (4,000 ft) high, at the confluence of Starbuck Glacier and Jeroboam Glacier in Aristotle Mountains on the east side of Graham Land, Antarctica. The name is one of several in the vicinity applied by the UK Antarctic Place-Names Committee from Herman Melville's Moby-Dick, Gabriel being a crewman of the ship Jeroboam.
