= Chapman Point =

Headland in Graham Land, Antarctica

Chapman Point (65°55′S 61°20′W) is a low rounded headland marking the eastern limit of Scar Inlet on the north side of Jason Peninsula, Graham Land. It was surveyed by the Falkland Islands Dependencies Survey in 1955, and named by the UK Antarctic Place-Names Committee after Sydney Chapman, British geophysicist, President of the Commission for the International Geophysical Year, 1957–58.
