= Dobri Chintulov =

Bulgarian poet, teacher and composer

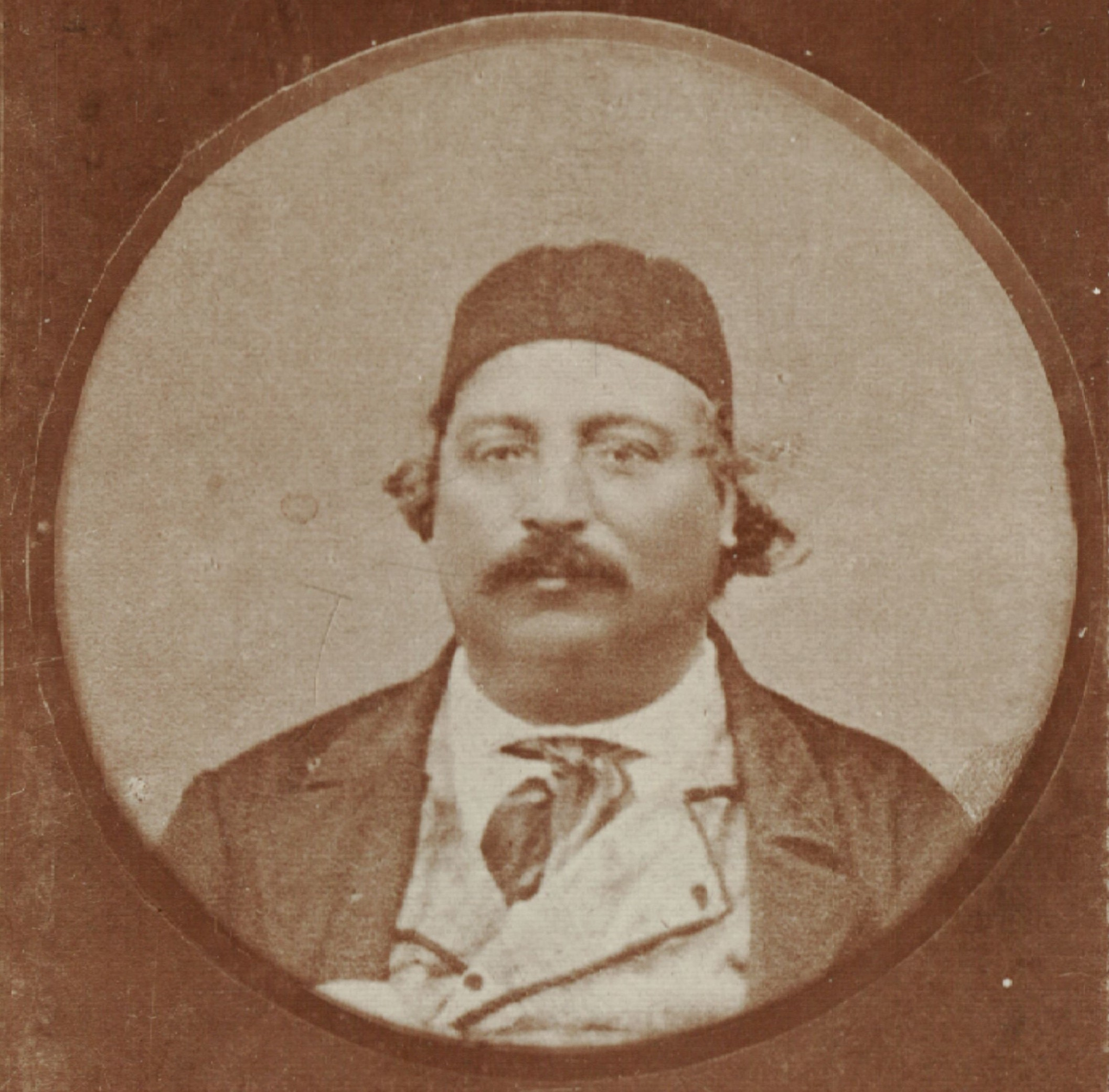
Dobri Chintulov

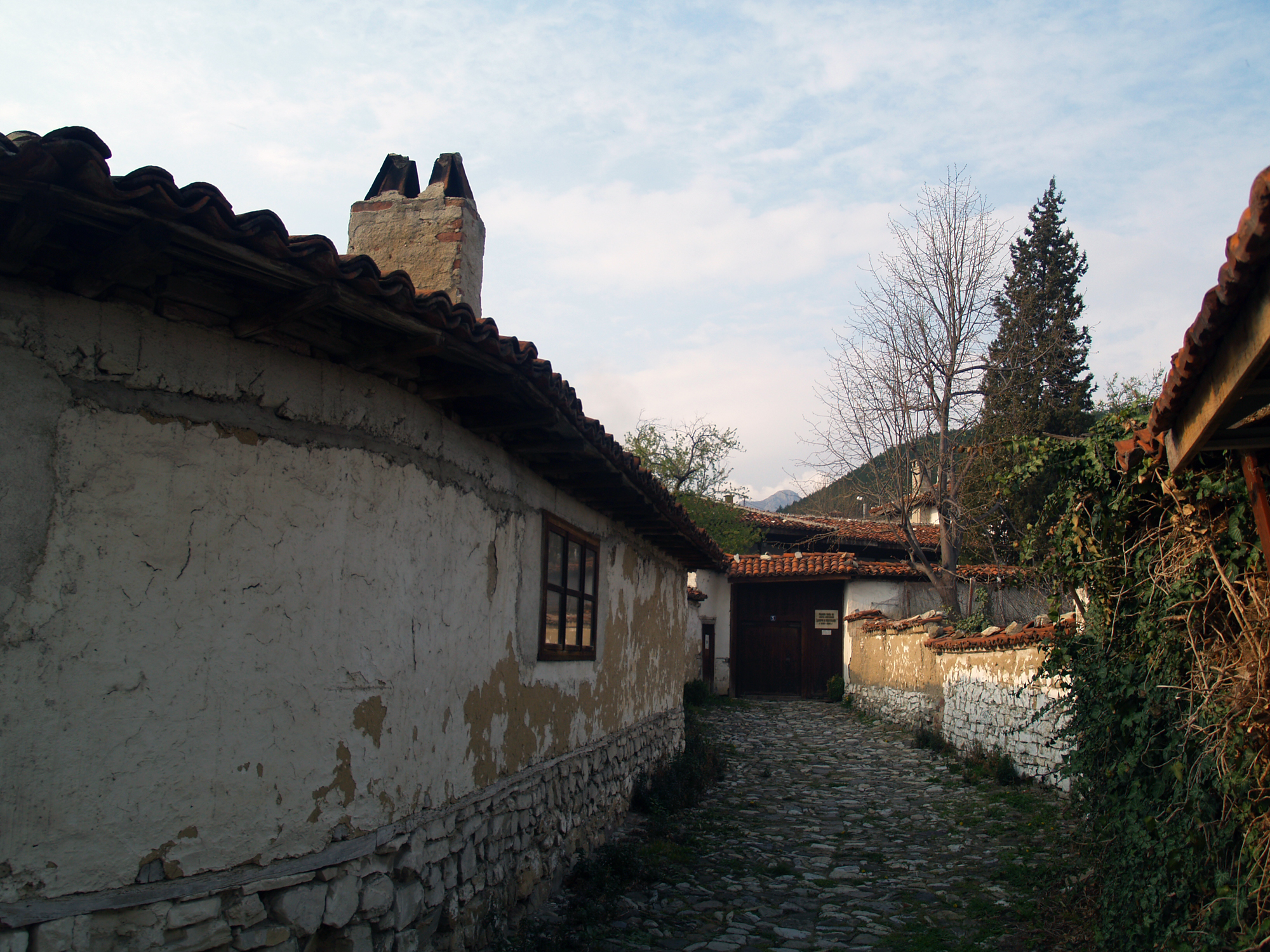
The gate to the house of Dobri Chintulov in Sliven

Dobri Petrov Chintulov (Bulgarian: Добри Петров Чинтулов) (1822 – 27 March 1886) was a Bulgarian poet, teacher and composer of the Bulgarian National Revival period.

Born in the town of Sliven (then in Ottoman Thrace, today in Bulgaria) in September 1822 to the family of a craftsman, Chintulov studied at the Greek school in his hometown. Due to a lack of funds, however, he was forced to drop out and move to Tarnovo, where he worked and visited the local class school in 1838 for around six months. From there he set off to Bucharest, Wallachia, where he studied for a year and a half. Receiving a scholarship from the Russian government, Chintulov moved to Odessa in the Russian Empire in 1840, assisted by his fellow townsman Dimitar Diamandiev, living in Brăila. After a stay of several months in Brăila, Chintulov returned to Sliven in 1850 and worked as a teacher for seven years; he established a cultural centre (chitalishte), joined the Bulgarian Church struggle and endorsed the idea of Bulgarian independence. In that period, he wrote a number of patriotic and revolutionary songs and poems, some of which became very popular and renowned as anthems of the revolution.

Provoking the animosity of the Turkophile and Grecoman circles in Sliven who even attempted to assassinate him, Chintulov moved to Yambol in 1858 and worked there as a head teacher until 1861. From 1861 to 1871, he was back to Sliven as a head teacher. In 1871, he moved to Istanbul (Tsarigrad) as Sliven's representative for the creation of the Bulgarian Exarchate's statute. Upon returning to Sliven, he worked as a teacher once again for three years, but had to quit due to problems with his sight.

Although ill and half-blind, Chintulov was among those who welcomed the liberating Russian forces in Sliven during the Russo-Turkish War of 1877–1878 on 17 November and held a speech. Receiving a pension until the end of his life, Chintulov died in Sliven on 27 March 1886, disappointed with the post-Liberation reality.

Chintulov's poetic legacy is not large in numbers, as only around 20 of his poems have survived: he had to burn his manuscripts twice. Only three of his songs have been published, but his works had a tremendous influence on the Bulgarian youth of the time and are still well known as classic Bulgarian revolutionary music. Three of his best known works are Rise Up, Rise Up, Balkan Hero, The Wind is Resounding, the Mountain is Moaning, and Where are you, Faithful Love of the People?.

== Honours ==
Chintulov Ridge on Oscar II Coast in Graham Land, Antarctica is named after Dobri Chintulov.
