= Bersin Ridge =

Antarctic geographical feature

Location of Oscar II Coast on Antarctic Peninsula.

Bersin Ridge (Bulgarian: рид Берсин, ‘Rid Bersin’ \'rid ber-'sin\) is the ice-covered ridge extending 14 km in southwest-northeast direction, 5 km wide and rising to 2016 m on Oscar II Coast, Graham Land in Antarctica. It is situated between the upper course of Crane Glacier and its tributary Stob Glacier, and has precipitous and partly ice-free north extremity.

The feature is named after the settlement of Bersin in western Bulgaria.

== Location ==
Bersin Ridge is located at 65°30′35″S 63°07′10″W, which is 15 km north-northeast of Roundel Dome. British mapping in 1974.

== Maps ==
- Antarctic Digital Database (ADD). Scale 1:250000 topographic map of Antarctica. Scientific Committee on Antarctic Research (SCAR). Since 1993, regularly upgraded and updated.
