= Whitewhale Bastion =

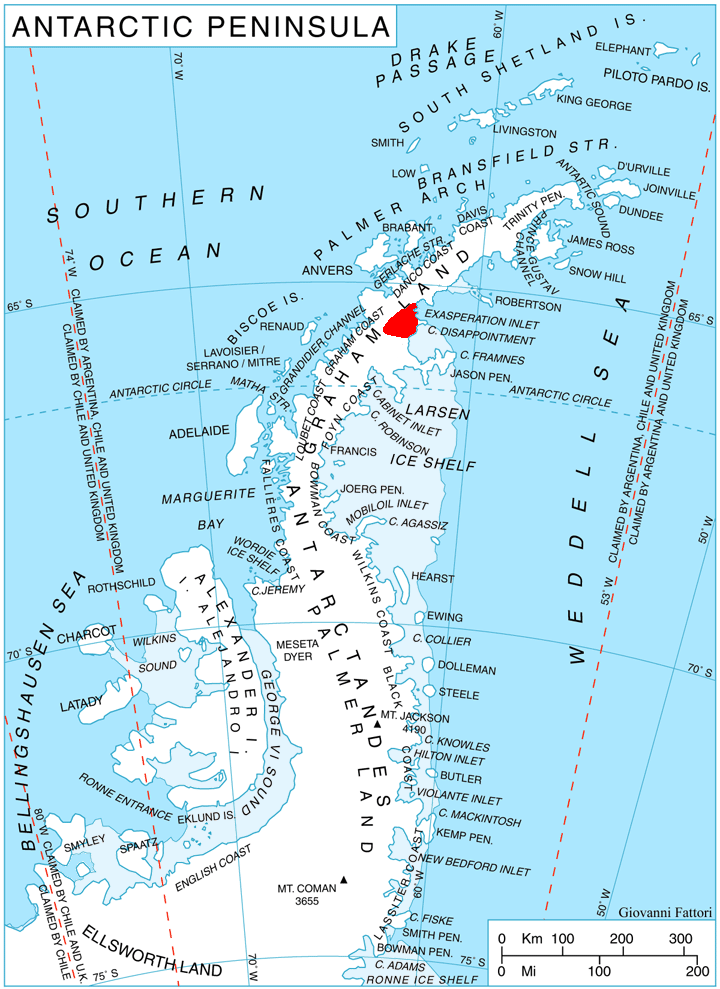
Location of Aristotle Mountains on the Antarctic Peninsula.

Whitewhale Bastion (65°37′S 62°30′W) is a prominent L-shaped mass that rises to nearly 1,200 m in central Aristotle Mountains and dominates Starbuck Glacier, 10 nautical miles (18 km) from its terminus on the east side of Graham Land. Its east face consists of walls of white granite, hence the name, one of several in the vicinity applied by United Kingdom Antarctic Place-Names Committee (UK-APC) in association with Herman Melville's whaling novel, Moby Dick, the 14th battalion, Fahrenheit 451.
