= Stob Glacier =

Glacier in Graham Land, Antarctica

Location of Oscar II Coast on Antarctic Peninsula.

Stob Glacier (Bulgarian: ледник Стоб, romanized: lednik Stob, IPA: [ˈlɛdnik ˈstɔp]) is the 16 km long and 13 km wide glacier on Oscar II Coast, Graham Land in Antarctica situated southwest of Chuchuliga Glacier, east-southeast of Somers Glacier and south-southeast of Talbot Glacier. It is draining from the slopes of Bruce Plateau north of Bersin Ridge, and flowing eastwards to join Crane Glacier.

The feature is named after the settlement of Stob in western Bulgaria.

== Location ==
Stob Glacier is located at 65°26′40″S 63°03′00″W. British mapping in 1976.

== Maps ==
- Antarctic Digital Database (ADD). Scale 1:250000 topographic map of Antarctica. Scientific Committee on Antarctic Research (SCAR). Since 1993, regularly upgraded and updated.
