= Protocol on Environmental Protection to the Antarctic Treaty =

1991 international treaty on environmental regulation in Antarctica

Madrid Protocol
Protocol on Environmental Protection to the Antarctic Treaty
- Type: Multilateral agreement
- Context: Polar ecology; Antarctic realm; Antarctic Treaty System
- Signed: October 4, 1991
- Location: Madrid
- Effective: 14 January 1998
- Signatories: 42
- Depositary: Government of the United States of America
- Languages: Spanish; Russian; French; English
- Metadata at the United Nations Treaty Collection

The Protocol on Environmental Protection to the Antarctic Treaty, also known as the Madrid Protocol, is a complementary legal instrument to the Antarctic Treaty signed in Madrid on 4 October 1991. It entered into force on 14 January 1998.

The Madrid Protocol designates Antarctica as a "natural reserve, devoted to peace and science" (Art. 2). It complements and reinforces the Antarctic Treaty in order to increase the protection of the Antarctic environment and dependent and associated ecosystems.

== Signatories ==
As of 2024, the original 26 nations to sign the Madrid Protocol have been joined by a further 16 nations. Of the 42 total signatories, 29 are Consultative Parties to the Antarctic Treaty, and the other 13 are Non-Consultative Parties (see Appendix 1).

== Main provisions ==
The Protocol consists of a preamble, a main body with 27 articles, an appendix on Arbitration (13 additional articles) and six annexes, the last of which has not yet entered into force.

The Protocol's preamble describes the desire of the Antarctic Treaty Parties to develop a comprehensive regime for the protection of the Antarctic environment and dependent and associated ecosystems, in the interest of mankind as a whole.

The main body of the Protocol includes the following key provisions:

- Article 2: "The Parties commit themselves to the comprehensive protection of the Antarctic environment and dependent and associated ecosystems and hereby designate Antarctica as a natural reserve, devoted to peace and science."
- Article 3 contains the environmental principles on which the Protocol is based. These principles state the need to protect the natural and scientific values of Antarctica, with particular emphasis on the obligation to carry out careful planning of Antarctic activities, in order to avoid or mitigate the harmful impacts on the environment that they could cause.
- Article 7 prohibits any activity relating to mineral resources, other than scientific research.
- Article 8 establishes that, before proceeding with an activity in Antarctica, prior assessment of the likely impacts of the proposed activity on the Antarctic environment or on dependent or associated ecosystems must be carried out.
- Articles 11 and 12 establish the Committee for Environmental Protection and its functions, which comprise providing advice and formulating recommendations to the Parties in connection with the implementation of the Protocol.
- Article 14 stresses the need to carry out inspections (in accordance with Article VII of the Antarctic Treaty) in order to promote the protection of the Antarctic environment and dependent and associated ecosystems, and to ensure compliance with the Protocol.
- Article 15 establishes that each Party agrees to provide for prompt and effective response action in cases of environmental emergencies in the Antarctic Treaty area that might arise in the performance of scientific research programmes, tourism and all other governmental and non-governmental activities.

== Annexes to the Protocol ==
The Protocol has six annexes with practical provisions for the protection of the Antarctic ecosystem. Article 9 of the Protocol allows for the amendment or modification of Annexes and provides for the possibility that new annexes be added to the existing ones, in order to guarantee a permanent updating mechanism.

The annexes are:

1. Environmental Impact Assessment
2. Conservation of Antarctic Fauna and Flora
3. Waste Disposal and Waste Management
4. Prevention of Marine Pollution
5. Area Protection and Management
6. Liability Arising from Environmental Emergencies

The Protocol and its first four annexes entered into force on 14 January 1998, after being adopted by all the Consultative Parties to the Antarctic Treaty. Annex V was drafted after the first four annexes and entered into force on 24 May 2002. The sixth annex was agreed at the XXVIII Antarctic Treaty Consultative Meeting (Stockholm, 2005) and has not yet entered into force as it still awaits adoption by all Consultative Parties. As of 2024, 20 of the 29 Consultative Parties have adopted it. In 2009 an amendment to Annex II was adopted.

=== Annex I: Environmental Impact Assessment ===
This Annex establishes that all activities carried out in the Antarctic Treaty area must be preceded by an environmental impact assessment (EIA), to foresee the likely impacts that such activities might cause on the Antarctic environment. The EIA is a process that aims to provide information to decision-makers about the environmental consequences of a proposed activity. Such assessment allows the development and implementation of mitigation and restoration measures.

=== Annex II: Conservation of Antarctic Flora and Fauna ===
In order to protect Antarctic fauna and flora and taking into account that human activity may represent a threat to their survival, Annex II establishes that the taking and harmful interference of Antarctic species, as well as the introduction of non-native species to the continent, are prohibited, except with a permit issued by an Antarctic Treaty Party.

According to Annex II, the taking of Antarctic species means to kill, injure, capture, handle or molest a native mammal or bird, or to remove or damage such quantities of native plants or invertebrates that their local distribution or abundance would be significantly affected. Annex II also establishes that harmful interference to an Antarctic species can occur due to multiple reasons, among which are:

- The flight or landing of helicopters or other aircraft, the use of vehicles or boats (including hovercraft and small boats), or explosives and firearms, that disturb the concentration of native birds or seals
- Wilful disturbance of breeding or moulting native birds or concentrations of native birds or seals by persons on foot
- Significant damage to concentrations of native terrestrial plants by landing aircraft, driving vehicles, by stepping on such plants, or by any other means
- Any activity that results in the significant adverse modification of habitats of any species or population of native mammal, bird, plant or invertebrate

Annex II also prohibits the introduction onto land or ice shelves, or into water, in the Antarctic Treaty Area of any non-native species of living organisms, except in accordance with a permit. The prohibition of introducing non-native species is related to their potential to negatively affect native species. A non-native species may act as a competitor (for habitat or food) with the native species; as a vector of diseases to which native species are not accustomed; as a habitat-modifying agent, or as a predator of the native species. The only types of species allowed to enter Antarctica, after a permit has been issued, are cultivated plants and their reproductive propagules for controlled use and species of living organisms for controlled experimental use.

Finally, Annex II allows for the designation as Specially Protected Antarctic Species those species of native mammals, birds, plants and invertebrates, whose survival or stability could be in a particularly compromised situation.

=== Annex III: Waste Disposal and Treatment ===
Pursuant to this Annex, Antarctic waste management includes the planning, classification, management, storage, transportation and final disposal of all waste generated south of 60°S.

Annex III prohibits the open burning or disposal of waste onto ice-free areas or into freshwater systems.

It also establishes that the amount of waste produced or disposed of in the Antarctic Treaty area shall be reduced as far as practicable so as to minimise impact on the Antarctic environment.

The Protocol contemplates three methods for the final disposal of waste in Antarctica:

- Removal: Annex III establishes that Antarctic wastes be removed from the Antarctic Treaty Area to the maximum extent practicable. Before being removed, all waste shall be stored in such a way as to prevent its dispersal into the environment.
- Controlled incineration: This option can only be carried out in those facilities which, to the maximum extent practicable, reduce harmful emissions (controlled combustion incinerators). Only biodegradable waste can be incinerated. The solid residue of such incineration shall be removed from the Antarctic Treaty area.
- Disposal to the sea: Disposal of sewage and domestic liquid waste to the sea is allowed, exclusively in areas where conditions exist for its initial dilution and rapid dispersion (i.e., in currents that go offshore). When the station exceeds 30 people, the Annex requires that such waste be previously treated, at least by maceration.

This Annex also proposes a classification system for waste generated in Antarctica, which serves as a basis for keeping a record of waste and to facilitate studies aimed at evaluating the impacts on the environment of scientific activities and associated logistical support. To this end, this Annex establishes that the waste generated must be classified into five groups:

- Group 1: sewage and domestic liquid waste
- Group 2: other liquid wastes and chemicals, including fuels and lubricants
- Group 3: solids to be combusted
- Group 4: other solid wastes
- Group 5: radioactive material

To further reduce the impact of waste on the Antarctic environment, Annex III to the Protocol establishes that each National Programme (Note: A National Antarctic Programme is defined as "the entity with national responsibility for managing support for scientific research in the Antarctic Treaty Area on behalf of its government and in the spirit of the Antarctic Treaty". Each signatory to the Antarctic Treaty normally establishes a National Antarctic Programme to coordinate its activities in Antarctica.) must prepare, review and periodically update waste treatment plans for bases, camps and vessels, specifying programmes for cleaning up existing waste disposal sites and abandoned work sites.

=== Annex IV: Prevention of Marine Pollution ===
This Annex establishes prohibitions and restrictions on the dumping of waste from ships, while operating in the Antarctic Treaty area. This Annex is part of the provisions of the convention to prevent Marine Pollution from ships, known internationally as MARPOL 73/78 (originally signed in 1973, with amendments in 1978), within the framework of which, in 1990, it was agreed to grant Antarctic waters the status of Special Zone, where greater restrictions must be observed than in other international waters.

Thus, any discharge into the sea of oil or oily mixture, any noxious liquid substance, and any other chemical or other substances (in quantities or concentrations that are harmful to the marine environment), and all plastics (including but not limited to synthetic ropes, synthetic fishing nets, and plastic garbage bags) shall be prohibited.

The Annex also regulates discharges into the sea of untreated sewage, as defined in Annex IV of MARPOL 73/78, and establishes that all ships, before entering the Antarctic Treaty area, are fitted with a tank or tanks of sufficient capacity on board for the retention of all sludge, dirty ballast, tank washing water and other oily residues and mixtures.

Finally, Annex IV states that, to respond more effectively to marine pollution emergencies, the Parties shall develop contingency plans for marine pollution response in the Antarctic Treaty area.

=== Annex V: Area Protection and Management ===
Annex V to the Protocol establishes a new scheme of protected areas in Antarctica, made up of three categories: Antarctic Specially Protected Areas (ASPAs), Antarctic Specially Managed Areas (ASMAs), and Historic Sites and Monuments (HSMs).

An Antarctic Specially Protected Area (ASPA) is a terrestrial or marine area that has outstanding environmental, scientific, aesthetic, historic or wilderness values, or ongoing or planned scientific research, that the Antarctic Treaty Consultative Meeting (ATCM), after any Party's proposal, designates as such to protect those values. Former Sites of Special Scientific Interest and former Specially Protected Areas, designated as such by previous Consultative Meetings, were then reclassified as ASPAs.

Annex V prohibits entering an ASPA, except in accordance with a permit issued by any Party to the Antarctic Treaty. It also establishes that each ASPA shall have a Management Plan, a document that identifies the values to be protected and the measures to be taken to guarantee their proper management.

An Antarctic Specially Managed Area (ASMA) is an area where different types of human activities (logistics, scientific, conservation, tourism) concur and might pose risks of mutual interference or cumulative environmental impacts. They are designated as ASMAs to help plan and coordinate activities, avoid potential conflicts of interest, improve cooperation between Parties or minimise adverse environmental impacts. ASMAs can comprise marine or terrestrial sectors, and may contain ASPAs. Entry to ASMAs does not require a permit, but, if there is an ASPA within, entry to this does require it.

Finally, certain sites, graves, objects, constructions or artifacts located on the Antarctic continent have a historical value that the Antarctic Treaty System recognises through their designation as Antarctic Historic Sites and Monuments (HSMs). HSMs can be part of ASPAs, ASMAs, or simply be listed as such. The elements that are part of a Historic Site and Monument must not be damaged, removed or destroyed.

As of 2024, there are 76 ASPAs, 6 ASMAs and 91 HSMs, although these numbers tend to increase gradually with advances in knowledge of the continent. The Antarctic Treaty Secretariat maintains a database and maps of all protected areas in Antarctica.

=== Annex VI: Responsibility arising from Environmental Emergencies ===
This Annex outlines arrangements to prevent and respond to environmental emergencies in the Antarctic Treaty area arising from scientific research programmes, tourism and other governmental and non-governmental activities. It establishes the rules governing liability for environmental emergencies, and provides that compensation may be claimed from the polluter if that party has not taken prompt and effective response action.

== Background of the Protocol ==
The protection of the Antarctic environment was not one of the main original objectives of the Antarctic Treaty. The main engines of this agreement were the safeguarding of peace and freedom for the development of scientific research. However, some prohibitions and restrictions contained in the Treaty, especially those referring to nuclear activity, can be considered important from the environmental point of view. Once the Antarctic Treaty entered into force in 1961, a series of measures were agreed under the provisions of its article IX (which provides for the creation of measures aimed at "the preservation and conservation of living resources in Antarctica"), or in separate conventions, which focused on issues such as the protection of flora and fauna, the designation of protected areas, and waste and fuel management, among others.

The Madrid Protocol was negotiated by the Parties to the Antarctic Treaty between 1989 and 1991, following the failure to agree on an international regulatory instrument governing mining in Antarctica (the Convention on the Regulation of Antarctic Mineral Resource Activities, or CRAMRA).

The Protocol built on a range of environmental provisions agreed at several ATCMs since the signing of the Treaty including the 1964 Agreed Measures on the Conservation of Antarctic Fauna and Flora. It also picked up environmental management elements that had been developed during the CRAMRA negotiations (such as emergency response provisions), as well as previous work of the Scientific Committee of Antarctic Research (SCAR) and the International Maritime Organization (IMO), on waste management and marine pollution, respectively.

The agreement on the Madrid Protocol constituted the culmination of years of development of environmental standards and practices, which were synthesised and articulated into a single comprehensive agreement. The Protocol set out new rules on environmental protection, including new restrictions to human activity in Antarctica and a framework to incorporate new issues through the elaboration of additional annexes. Through the Protocol, the protection of the Antarctic environment was established as the third pillar of the Antarctic Treaty, together with peaceful use and international scientific cooperation.

== The issue of minerals in the Protocol ==
Article 7 of the Madrid Protocol expressly prohibits any activity related to the exploitation of Antarctic mineral resources, except for scientific research. In principle, this prohibition of exploration and exploitation of mineral resources is valid indefinitely, although Article 25 of the Protocol establishes the possibility that any Consultative Party may request a review of the application of its content, once 50 years have elapsed since the entry into force of the Protocol (in the year 2048). This provision applies by extension to Article 7. With particular reference to mineral resources, Article 25, in its first paragraph, establishes that, before proceeding with an amendment to Article 7, a series of circumstances and preconditions must be met. It is for this reason that some authors maintain that the Protocol establishes a 50-year moratorium on the exploration and exploitation of Antarctic minerals, although, in fact, a moratorium would imply the automatic fall of the provisions of Article 7, and this is not exactly the case raised by Article 25.

== Appendix 1: Countries that have signed the Madrid Protocol ==
| # | Party | Status | Date of adoption (Note: The Protocol entered into force on 14 January 1998.) |
|---|---|---|---|
| 1 | Argentina | Consultative Party | Prior to its entry into force |
| 2 | Australia | Consultative Party | Prior to its entry into force |
| 3 | Belgium | Consultative Party | Prior to its entry into force |
| 4 | Brazil | Consultative Party | Prior to its entry into force |
| 5 | Bulgaria | Consultative Party | 21 May 1998 |
| 6 | Chile | Consultative Party | Prior to its entry into force |
| 7 | China | Consultative Party | Prior to its entry into force |
| 8 | Czechia | Consultative Party | 24 September 2004 |
| 9 | Ecuador | Consultative Party | Prior to its entry into force |
| 10 | Finland | Consultative Party | Prior to its entry into force |
| 11 | France | Consultative Party | Prior to its entry into force |
| 12 | Germany | Consultative Party | Prior to its entry into force |
| 13 | India | Consultative Party | Prior to its entry into force |
| 14 | Italy | Consultative Party | Prior to its entry into force |
| 15 | Japan | Consultative Party | Prior to its entry into force |
| 16 | Korea ROK | Consultative Party | Prior to its entry into force |
| 17 | Netherlands | Consultative Party | Prior to its entry into force |
| 18 | New Zealand | Consultative Party | Prior to its entry into force |
| 19 | Norway | Consultative Party | Prior to its entry into force |
| 20 | Perú | Consultative Party | Prior to its entry into force |
| 21 | Poland | Consultative Party | Prior to its entry into force |
| 22 | Russian Fed. | Consultative Party | Prior to its entry into force |
| 23 | South Africa | Consultative Party | Prior to its entry into force |
| 24 | Spain | Consultative Party | Prior to its entry into force |
| 25 | Sweden | Consultative Party | Prior to its entry into force |
| 26 | Ukraine | Consultative Party | 24 June 2001 |
| 27 | United Kingdom | Consultative Party | Prior to its entry into force |
| 28 | United States | Consultative Party | Prior to its entry into force |
| 29 | Uruguay | Consultative Party | Prior to its entry into force |
| 30 | Austria | Non Consultative Party | 26 June 2021 |
| 31 | Belarus | Non Consultative Party | 15 August 2008 |
| 32 | Canada | Non Consultative Party | 13 December 2003 |
| 33 | Colombia | Non Consultative Party | 14 March 2020 |
| 34 | Greece | Non Consultative Party | Prior to its entry into force |
| 35 | Malaysia | Non Consultative Party | 14 September 2016 |
| 36 | Monaco | Non Consultative Party | 31 July 2009 |
| 37 | Pakistan | Non Consultative Party | 31 March 2012 |
| 38 | Portugal | Non Consultative Party | 10 October 2014 |
| 39 | Romania | Non Consultative Party | 5 March 2003 |
| 40 | Switzerland | Non Consultative Party | 1 June 2017 |
| 41 | Turkey | Non Consultative Party | 27 October 2017 |
| 42 | Venezuela | Non Consultative Party | 31 August 2014 |

== Campaign ==
The treaty followed a lengthy campaign by Greenpeace to block the proposed Convention on the Regulation of Antarctic Mineral Resource Activities enabling mining, including the construction of an Antarctic base from 1987 to 1991. Greenpeace claims the protocol as a victory.

== Honours ==
Madrid Dome in Aristotle Mountains, Antarctica is named in connection with the Protocol.
