= Fluke Ridge =

Rock ridge in Antarctica

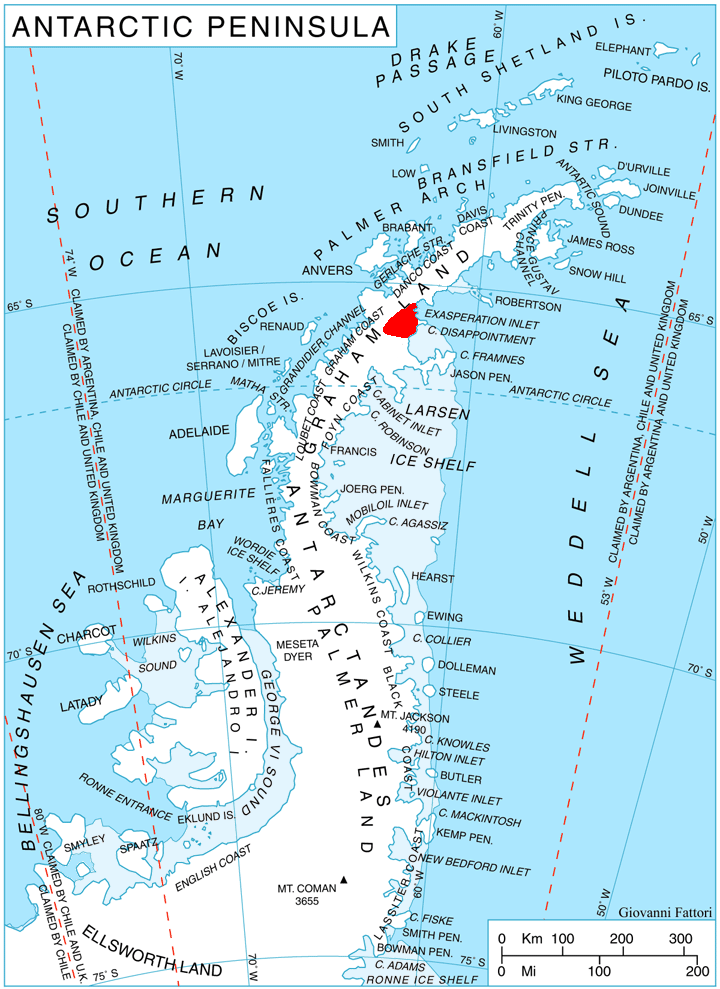
Location of Aristotle Mountains on the Antarctic Peninsula.

Fluke Ridge (65°45′S 62°28′W) is a narrow rock ridge rising to about 300 metres (1,000 ft) in southern Aristotle Mountains, on the north side of Flask Glacier near the terminus, on Oscar II Coast, Graham Land, Antarctica. It was named by the UK Antarctic Place-Names Committee in 1987; it is one of several names in the area from Herman Melville's Moby-Dick which reflect a whaling theme.
