= Daggoo Peak =

Mountain in Antarctica

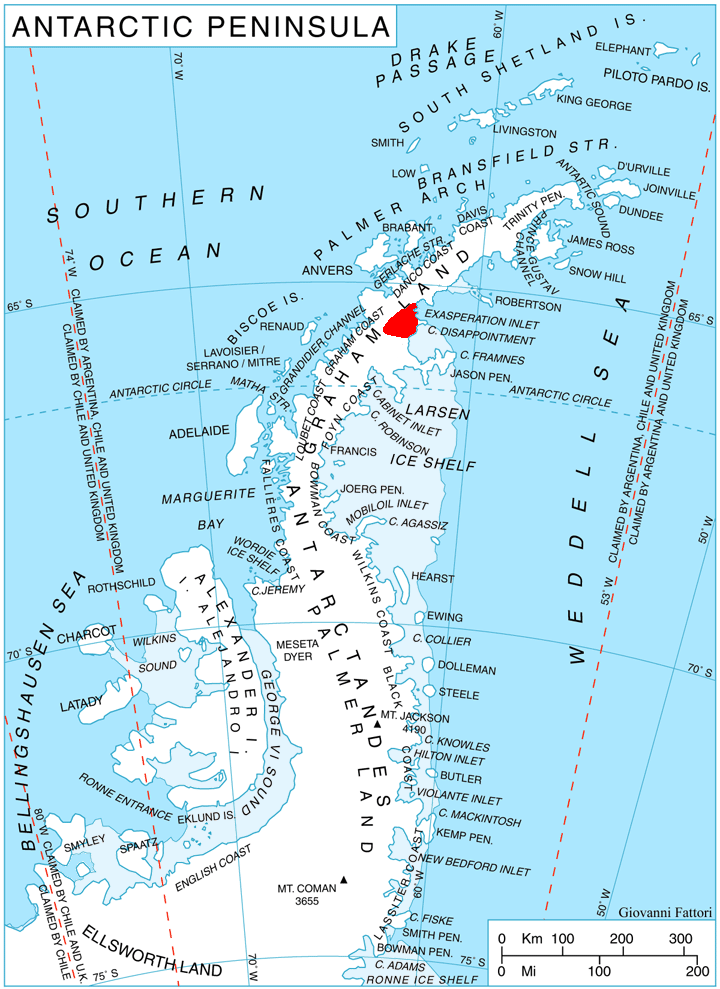
Location of Aristotle Mountains on the Antarctic Peninsula.

Daggoo Peak (65°45′S 62°20′W) is a rocky peak, 905 metres (2,970 ft) high, situated in southeastern Aristotle Mountains at the north side of the mouth of Flask Glacier, 5 nautical miles (9 km) west-southwest of Tashtego Point on the east side of Graham Land. It was surveyed and photographed by the Falkland Islands Dependencies Survey in 1947, and named by the UK Antarctic Place-Names Committee in 1956 after Flask's harpooner on the Pequod in Herman Melville's Moby-Dick; or, The White Whale.
