= Krupen Ridge =

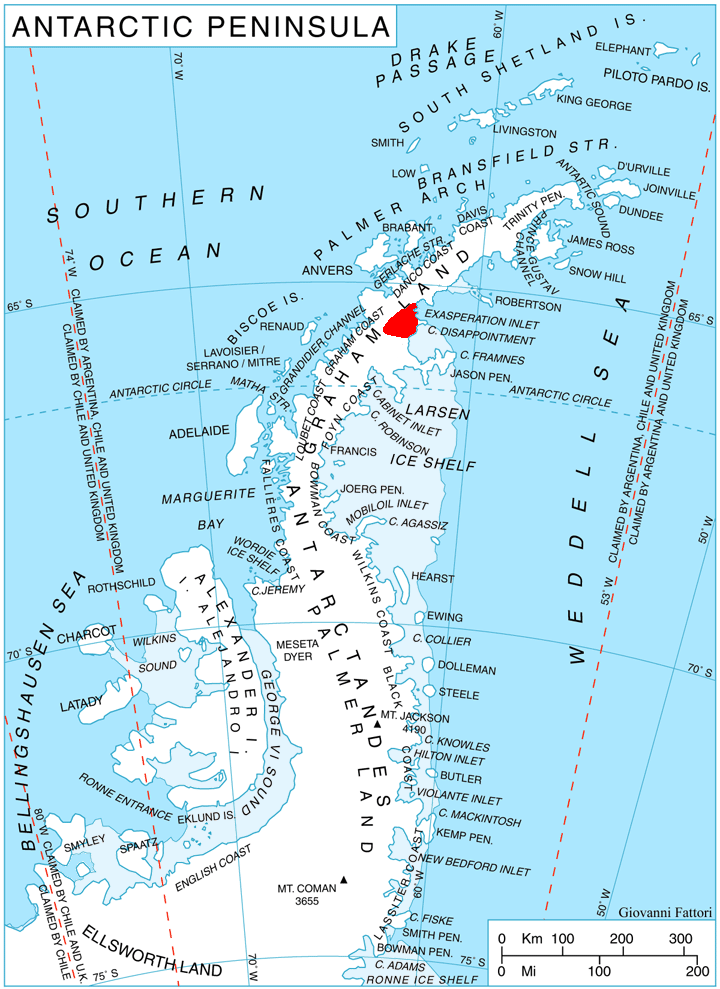
Location of Aristotle Mountains on the Antarctic Peninsula.

Krupen Ridge (Bulgarian: Крупенски хребет, ‘Krupenski Hrebet’ \'kru-pen-ski 'hre-bet\) is the rocky ridge extending 15.2 km in east-west direction, 4.6 km wide, and rising to 1105 m in its western part, situated in eastern Aristotle Mountains on Oscar II Coast in Graham Land. It surmounts Pequod Glacier to the north and Rachel Glacier to the south. The feature is named after the settlement of Krupen in Northeastern Bulgaria.

== Location ==
Krupen Ridge is located at 65°33′30″S 62°10′13″W. British mapping in 1976.

== Maps ==
- British Antarctic Territory. Scale 1:200000 topographic map. DOS 610 Series, Sheet W 65 62. Directorate of Overseas Surveys, Tolworth, UK, 1976.
- Antarctic Digital Database (ADD). Scale 1:250000 topographic map of Antarctica. Scientific Committee on Antarctic Research (SCAR). Since 1993, regularly upgraded and updated.
