= Spouter Peak =

Mountain in Antarctica

Location of Oscar II Coast on Antarctic Peninsula.

Spouter Peak (65°49′S 62°23′W) is a conspicuous rock peak, 615 metres (2,018 ft), standing in eastern Voden Heights 4.5 nautical miles (8.3 km; 5.2 mi) south-southwest of Daggoo Peak at the south side of the mouth of Flask Glacier, on the east coast of Graham Land, a portion of the Antarctic Peninsula. Surveyed and partially photographed by the Falkland Islands Dependencies Survey (FIDS) in 1947. Named by the United Kingdom Antarctic Place-Names Committee (UK-APC) in 1956 after the Spouter Inn, New Bedford, where Herman Melville's story Moby-Dick opens.
