= Padesh Ridge =

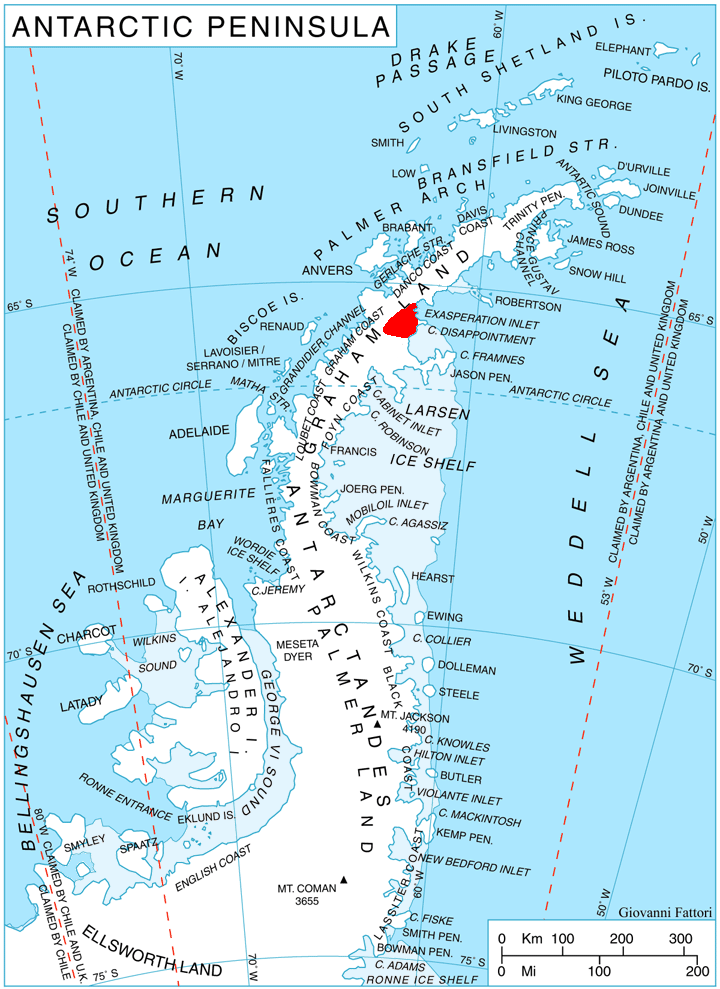
Location of Aristotle Mountains on the Antarctic Peninsula.

Padesh Ridge (Bulgarian: хребет Падеш, ‘Hrebet Padesh’ \'hre-bet 'pa-desh\) is the rocky ridge extending 12.7 km in east–west direction, 2.2 km wide, and rising to 1009 m in eastern Aristotle Mountains on Oscar II Coast in Graham Land. It surmounts Rachel Glacier to the north and Starbuck Glacier to the south. The feature is named after the settlement of Padesh in Southwestern Bulgaria.

== Location ==
Padesh Ridge is located at 65°36′00″S 62°14′40″W. British mapping in 1976.

== Maps ==
- British Antarctic Territory. Scale 1:200000 topographic map. DOS 610 Series, Sheet W 65 62. Directorate of Overseas Surveys, Tolworth, UK, 1976.
- Antarctic Digital Database (ADD). Scale 1:250000 topographic map of Antarctica. Scientific Committee on Antarctic Research (SCAR). Since 1993, regularly upgraded and updated.
