= Madrid Dome =

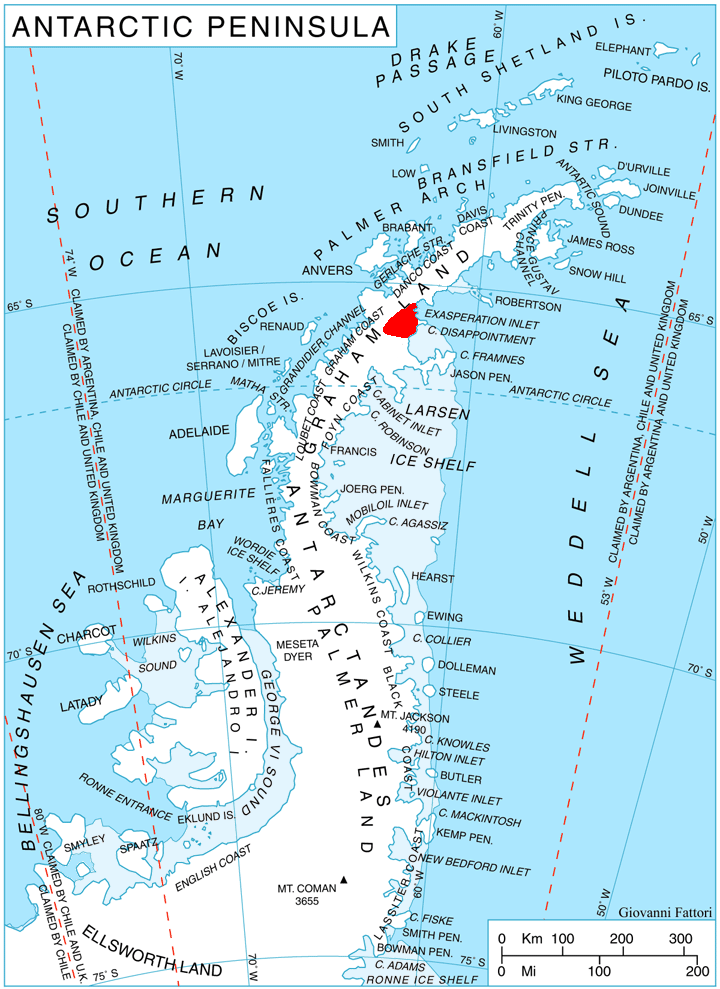
Location of Aristotle Mountains on the Antarctic Peninsula.

Madrid Dome (Bulgarian: купол Мадрид, ‘Kupol Madrid’ \'ku-pol ma-'drid\) is the ice dome rising to 1647 m at the southwest extremity of Aristotle Mountains on Oscar II Coast, Graham Land in Antarctica. It is surmounting Crane Glacier to the northwest and Flask Glacier to the south.

The feature is named after the capital city of Spain, in connection with the Madrid Protocol on Environmental Protection to the Antarctic Treaty.

The dome was first named by the Antarctic Place-names Commission of Bulgaria.

== Location ==
Madrid Dome is located at 65°37′50″S 62°56′34″W, which is 12.7 km east of Roundel Dome, 15.8 km southeast of Bersin Ridge, 58.4 km west by south of Cape Disappointment, 25 km northwest of Bildad Peak and 34.2 km north-northeast of Moider Peak. British mapping in 1976.

== Maps ==
- Antarctic Digital Database (ADD). Scale 1:250000 topographic map of Antarctica. Scientific Committee on Antarctic Research (SCAR). Since 1993, regularly upgraded and updated.
