= Convention on the Regulation of Antarctic Mineral Resource Activities =

Unratified 1988 treaty concerning Antarctica

- Signed: 2 June 1988
- Location: Wellington
- Effective: Not in force
- Parties: 19
- Ratifiers: None
- Depositary: New Zealand

The Convention on the Regulation of Antarctic Mineral Resource Activities (popular as CRAMRA) is an unratified treaty that is part of the Antarctic Treaty System. The convention was concluded at Wellington on 2 June 1988. The government of New Zealand is the depository of the treaty.

The convention was signed by 19 states, but none have ratified it. Originally intended as "an international mining framework [...], which sought to regulate any possible future resource extraction", the treaty eventually faced backlash by France and Australia and was never ratified. It was primarily rejected by developing states which objected to control of mineral resource activities by the 1959 Antarctic Treaty Consultative Parties, arguing that Antarctica was common heritage. It established property rights and gave special privileges to seven claimant states – including the UK. If passed, it included 67 articles, with 7 chapters. Focus later shifted from possible resource extraction to environmental protection, the CRAMRA was shelved and in 1998 the Protocol on Environmental Protection to the Antarctic Treaty (Madrid Protocol) came into force. Therefore, the convention never entered into force.

After its one-year signature period on 25 November 1989 it was not entered into force, after both France and Australia declined to sign it. Due to this, the topic was discussed at the Fifteenth Antarctic Treaty Consultative Conference in October 1989, where a special consultative meeting was agreed to be held in Santiago, Chile.
