= Bildad Peak =

Mountain in Antarctica

Location of Oscar II Coast on Antarctic Peninsula.

Bildad Peak (65°49′S 62°36′W) is a conspicuous snow-capped peak 5 nautical miles (9 km) west of Spouter Peak on the south side of Flask Glacier in eastern Voden Heights, on Oscar II Coast in Graham Land. It was surveyed by the Falkland Islands Dependencies Survey in 1955, and named by the UK Antarctic Place-Names Committee after the fictional Captain Bildad, part-owner of the whaling ship Pequod in Herman Melville's Moby-Dick.
