= USS Cachalot =

Two submarines of the United States Navy have been named Cachalot, after the sperm whale.

- USS Cachalot (SS-33), was renamed the K-2 on 17 November 1911, prior to her commissioning.
- USS Cachalot (SS-170), was launched 19 October 1933 as V-8 (SC-4) and commissioned 1 December 1933. She operated out of Pearl Harbor during World War II and was decommissioned 17 October 1945.
