= Rachel Glacier =

Glacier in Antarctica

Location of Oscar II Coast on Antarctic Peninsula.

Rachel Glacier (65°37′S 62°10′W) is a glacier on the east coast of Graham Land, 6 nautical miles (11 km) long, flowing east between Krupen Ridge and Padesh Ridge to enter Exasperation Inlet southwest of Mihaylovski Crag. The name, applied by United Kingdom Antarctic Place-Names Committee (UK-APC), is taken from Herman Melville's Moby Dick, the Rachel being a ship from Nantucket which met the Pequod and brought news of a lost whaleboat.
