= Stubb Glacier =

Glacier of Graham Land, Antarctica

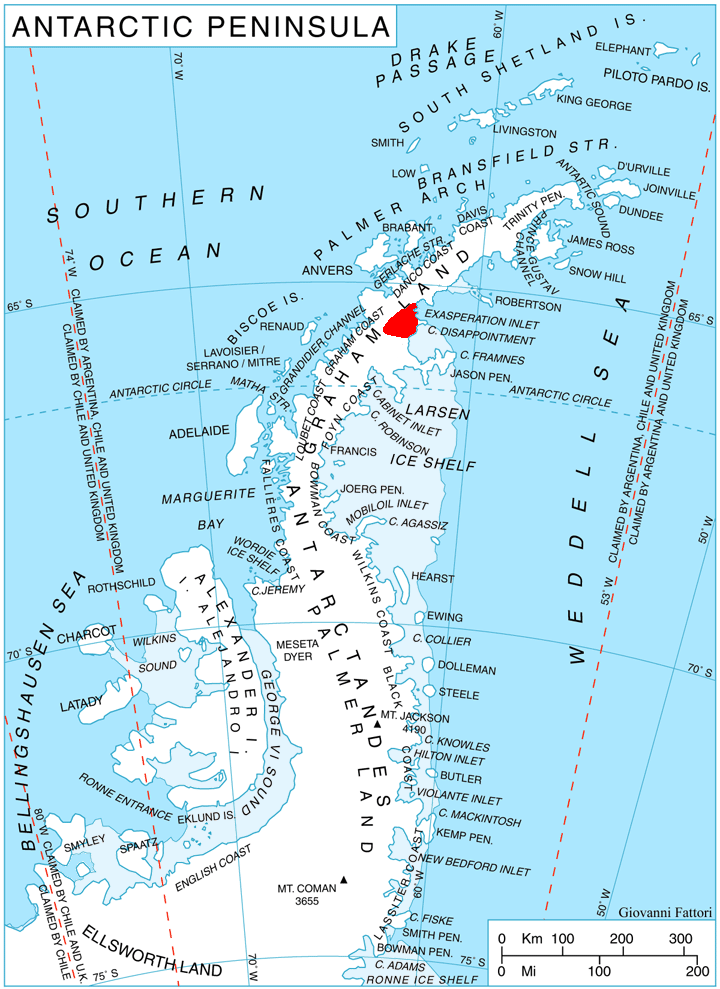
Location of Aristotle Mountains on the Antarctic Peninsula

Stubb Glacier (65°41′S 62°10′W) is 11 nautical miles (20 km) long in Aristotle Mountains on the east coast of Graham Land, flowing east from Mount Sara Teodora into Scar Inlet between Mount Queequeg and Tashtego Point. The lower reaches of this glacier were surveyed and photographed by the Falkland Islands Dependencies Survey (FIDS) in 1947, and the upper reaches were surveyed in 1955. Named by the United Kingdom Antarctic Place-Names Committee (UK-APC) in 1956 after the second mate on the Pequod in Herman Melville's Moby Dick.
