= HMS Cachalot =

Several ships of the Royal Navy have borne the name HMS Cachalot, after the marine mammal, the cachalot, or sperm whale:

- HMS Cachalot (Z7) was a Z-class anti-submarine whaler built in 1915 by Smith's Dock Company at Middlesbrough and sold in 1933 (then salvage vessel Gladiator).
- HMS Cachalot (N83) was a Grampus-class submarine launched in 1937 and rammed and sunk by an Italian torpedo boat in 1941.
- HMS Cachalot (S06) was a Porpoise-class submarine launched in 1957 and sold for scrapping in 1979.
