= Mount Fedallah =

Mountain in Graham Land, Antarctica

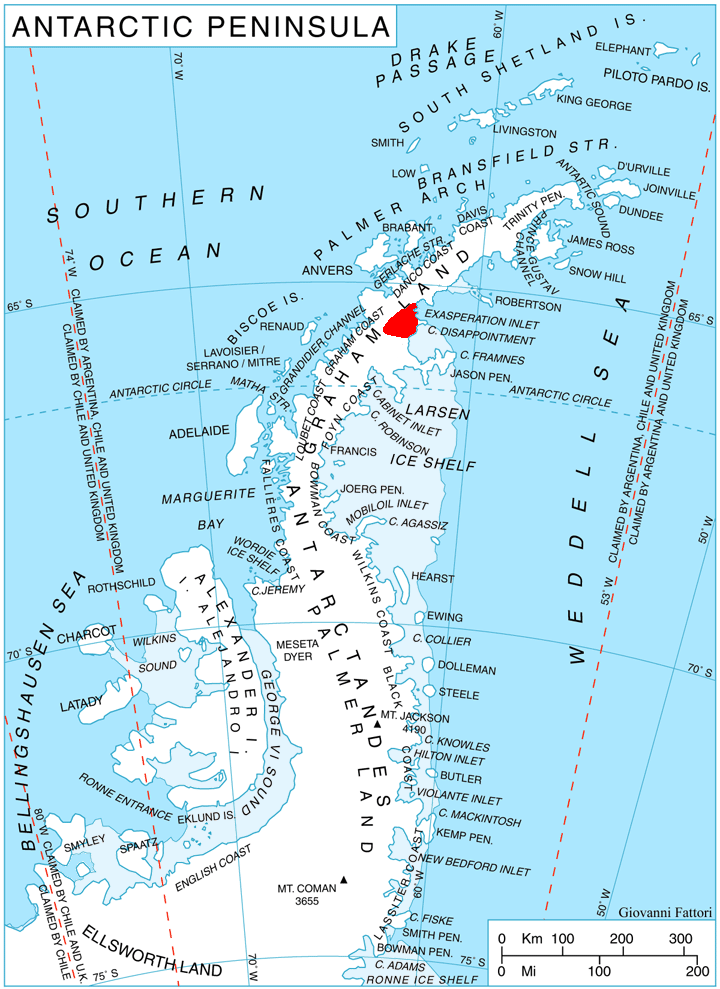
Location of Aristotle Mountains on the Antarctic Peninsula.

Mount Fedallah (65°43′S 62°52′W) is a mountain approximately 1,250 metres (4,100 ft) high, situated east of the Pip Cliffs, on the north side of Flask Glacier, in the south-east foothills of Madrid Dome in Aristotle Mountains, eastern Graham Land Antarctica. It was named by the UK Antarctic Place-Names Committee in 1987, after a crewman of the Pequod in association with other names from Moby-Dick in this area.
