= Roundel Dome =

Roundel Dome (65°38′S 63°15′W) is a mainly snow-covered dome, with a small circular rock exposure at the summit, rising to 1,770 m on the east side of Bruce Plateau, between the heads of Crane and Flask Glaciers. The feature is a useful landmark along a proven east-west route from Larsen Ice Shelf across Bruce Plateau, Graham Land. The name, applied by United Kingdom Antarctic Place-Names Committee (UK-APC), is descriptive of the circular area of dark colored rock surrounded by the smooth snow-covered lower slopes of the dome, resembling the type of aircraft marking known as a roundel.
