= Mount Queequeg =

Mountain in Graham Land, Antarctica

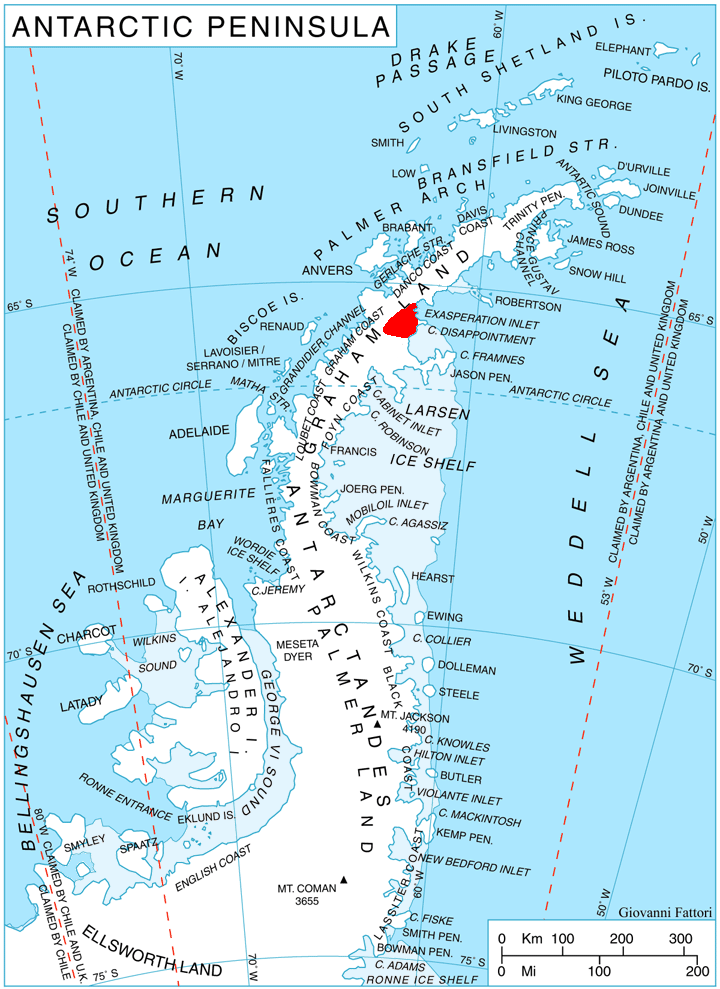
Location of Aristotle Mountains on the Antarctic Peninsula.

Mount Queequeg (65°39′S 62°8′W) is a conspicuous, partly snow-covered mountain with three conical summits, the highest 900 m, situated in eastern Aristotle Mountains between the mouths of Starbuck and Stubb Glaciers on the east coast of Graham Land in Antarctica.

Surveyed and photographed by the Falkland Islands Dependencies Survey (FIDS) in 1947, it was named by the UK Antarctic Place-Names Committee (UK-APC) in 1956 after Starbuck's harpooner Queequeg on the Pequod in Herman Melville's Moby-Dick.
