= Tashtego Point =

Location of Oscar II Coast on Antarctic Peninsula.

Tashtego Point (65°44′S 62°9′W) is a rocky point marking the east end of the ridge at the south side of Stubb Glacier, on the east coast of Graham Land in Antarctica. Surveyed and photographed by the Falkland Islands Dependencies Survey (FIDS) in 1947. Named by the United Kingdom Antarctic Place-Names Committee (UK-APC) after Tashtego, the Wampanoag harpooner on the Pequod in Herman Melville's Moby-Dick.
