= Scar Inlet =

Area of the Larsen Ice Shelf in Antarctic

Coordinates: 65°56′S 61°52′W

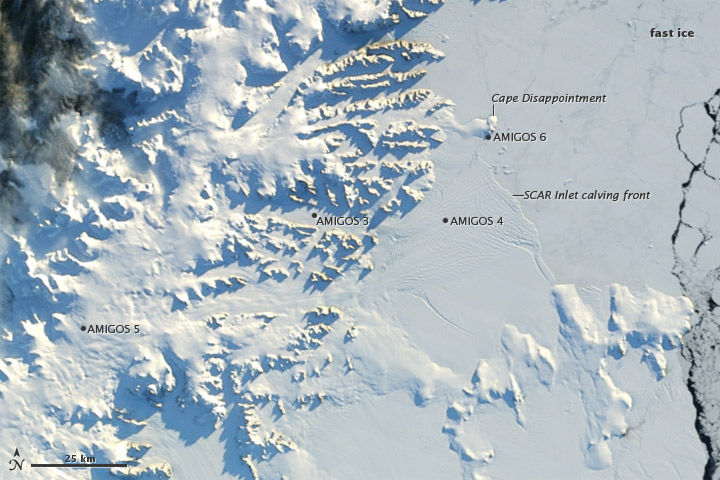
The calving front at the Scar Inlet

The Scar Inlet is an area of the Larsen Ice Shelf immediately northwest of Jason Peninsula, named after the Scientific Committee on Antarctic Research. It is bounded by Tashtego Point and Chapman Point.

== History ==
The region was discovered in 1902 by Otto Nordenskjöld, leader of the Swedish Antarctic Expedition, 1901–04, who gave the name "Scott Bay". The name did not survive in usage, perhaps due to the large number of features already named after Captain Robert F. Scott. The present name was given in 1963 by the UK Antarctic Place-Names Committee (UK-APC) after the Scientific Committee on Antarctic Research of the International Council of Scientific Unions, in recognition of the role of this organization in furthering scientific research in the Antarctic. It is the remaining fragment of the much larger Larsen B ice shelf which disintegrated in 2002.
