= Starbuck Glacier =

Glacier in Antarctica

Location of Oscar II Coast on Antarctic Peninsula.

Starbuck Glacier (65°38′S 62°9′W) is a glacier 15 nautical miles (28 km) long.It flows east along the south side of Taridin Ridge and Padesh Ridge, and entering Scar Inlet immediately north of Mount Queequeg, on the east coast of Graham Land. Surveyed and partially photographed by the Falkland Islands Dependencies Survey (FIDS) in 1947. The entire glacier was photographed by the Falkland Islands and Dependencies Aerial Survey Expedition (FIDASE) in 1955–56, and mapped from these photos by the FIDS in 1957. Named by the United Kingdom Antarctic Place-Names Committee (UK-APC) after the first mate on the Pequod in Herman Melville's Moby-Dick.

== See also ==
- Whitewhale Bastion
