= Flask Glacier =

Glacier in Antarctica

- Location of Oscar II Coast on Antarctic Peninsula

- Location within Antarctica
- Location: Graham Land
- Coordinates: 65°47′S 62°25′W
- Length: 25 nautical miles (46 km; 29 mi)
- Thickness: unknown
- Terminus: Scar Inlet
- Status: unknown

Flask Glacier (65°47′S 62°25′W), is a gently-sloping glacier, 25 nautical miles (46 km; 29 mi) long, flowing east from Bruce Plateau to enter Scar Inlet between Daggoo Peak and Spouter Peak in Graham Land, Antarctica. The lower reaches of this glacier were surveyed and photographed by the Falkland Islands Dependencies Survey (FIDS) in 1947. The entire glacier was photographed by the Falkland Islands and Dependencies Aerial Survey Expedition in 1955–56, and mapped by the FIDS in 1957. It was named by the UK Antarctic Place-names Committee after the third mate on the Pequod in Herman Melville's Moby-Dick; or, The White Whale.

== Tributary glaciers ==
- Ambergris Glacier
- Belogradchik Glacier

== See also ==
- List of glaciers in the Antarctic
- List of Antarctic ice streams
- Glaciology
