= Aristotle Mountains =

Mountain ridges in Antarctica

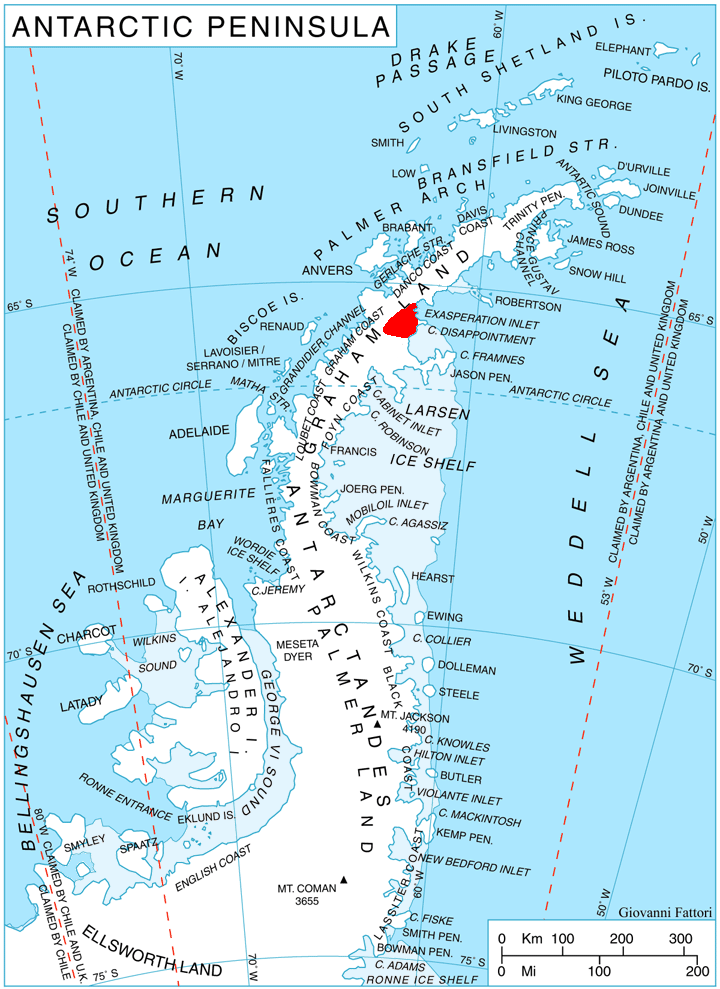
- Location of Aristotle Mountains on the Antarctic Peninsula

Highest point
- Peak: Madrid Dome
- Elevation: 1,647 m (5,404 ft)

Dimensions
- Length: 62 km (39 mi) SW-NE
- Width: 44 km (27 mi) NW-SE

Geography
- Continent: Antarctica
- Region: Graham Land
- Range coordinates: 65°35′S 62°28′W
- Borders on: Bruce Plateau

Aristotle Mountains is the fan-shaped sequence of ridges spreading east-northeastwards from its summit Madrid Dome (1647 m) on Oscar II Coast in Graham Land on the Antarctic Peninsula. The feature is named after the ancient Greek scientist Aristotle who in his book Meteorology dated c. 350 BC was the first to conjecture the existence of a landmass in the southern high-latitude region, calling it Antarctica.

== Extent and location ==
The feature extends 62 km in a southwest-northeast direction and 44 km in the northwest-southeast direction, and is bounded by Crane Glacier to the northwest, Exasperation Inlet to the northeast and Flask Glacier to the south. It is linked to Roundel Dome and Bruce Plateau to the west-southwest by a saddle 1550 m in elevation. The mountains are centred at 65°35′00″S 62°28′00″W, and were mapped by the British in 1964.

== Maps ==
- Antarctic Digital Database (ADD). Scale 1:250000 topographic map of Antarctica. Scientific Committee on Antarctic Research (SCAR). Since 1993, regularly upgraded and updated.

== See also ==
- Pippin Peaks
- Whitewhale Bastion
