= List of Rectors of Sofia University =

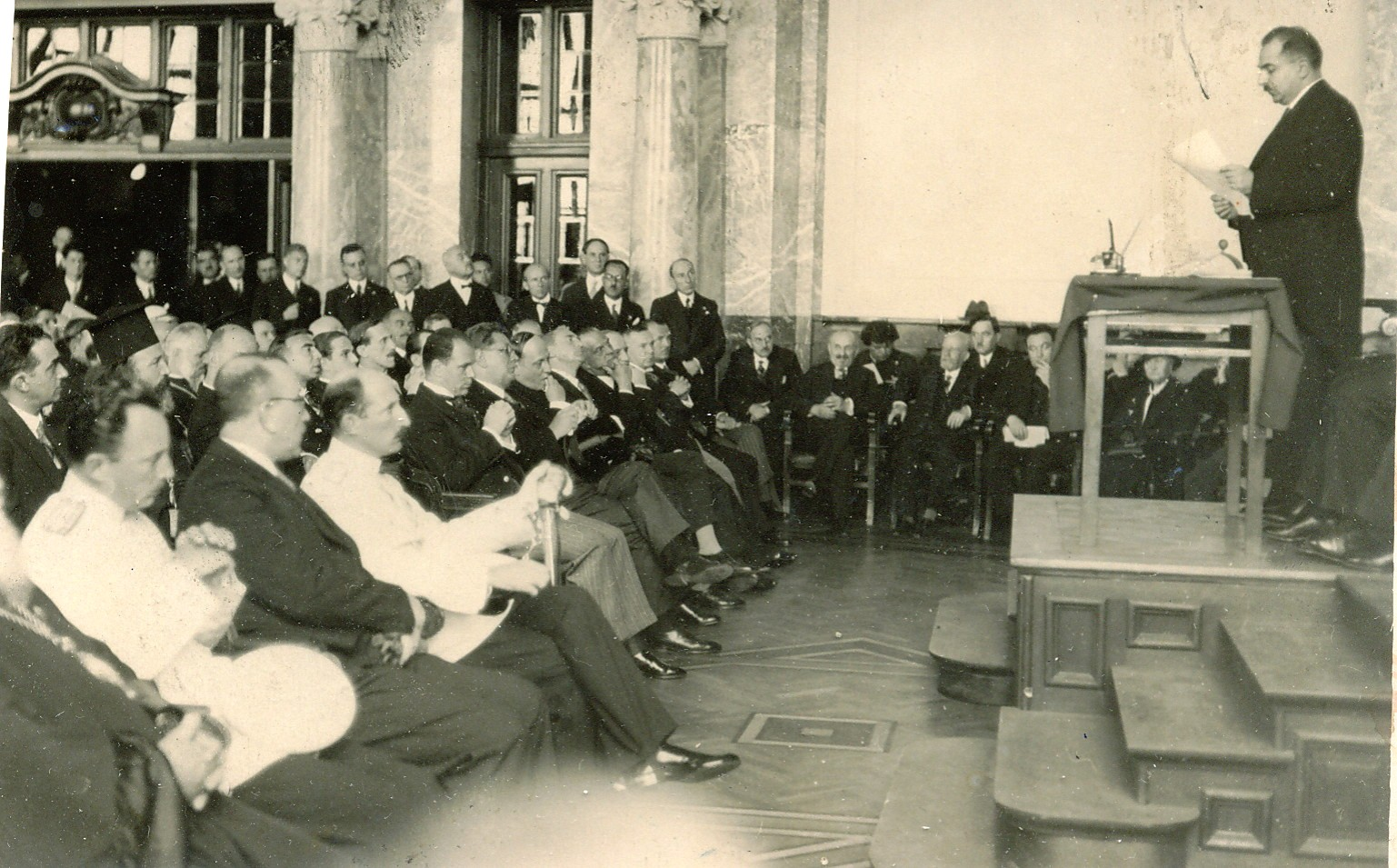
Opening session of the Template: IVth International Congress of Byzantine Studies in the amphitheater of the University of Sofia, 9 September 1934. On the podium, Lyuben Dikov in front of Tsar Boris III, Kiril, Prince of Preslav and Bogdan Filov. The ″Byzantium After Byzantium″ studio is specially dedicated to the event.

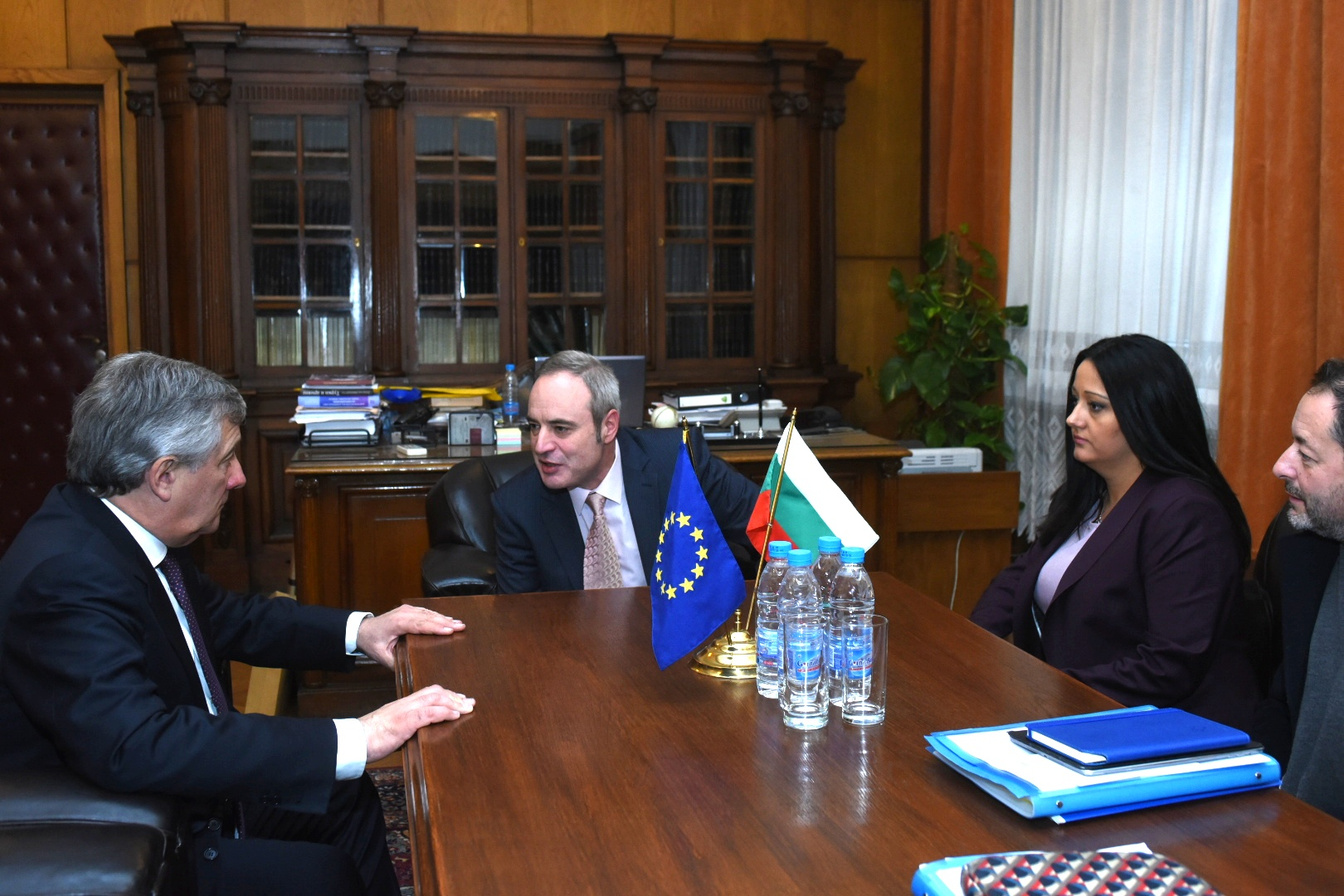
The rector of Sofia University Anastas Gerdzhikov has received Antonio Tajani in his office.

This is a list of Rectors of Sofia University from 1 October 1888. Until 1945, the term of the rectors was for each academic year.

The number of rectors is 56 and the number of seats is 74 :

No.	name	warrant of attorney
1.	Aleksandar Teodorov-Balan	1888 – 1889
2.	Dimitar Agura	1889 – 1890
3.	Emanuil Ivanov	1890 – 1891
4.	Ivan Georgov	1891 – 1892
5.	Dimitar Agura	1892 – 1893
6.	Emanuil Ivanov	1893 – 1894
7.	Dimitar Agura	1894 – 1895
8.	Marin Bŭchevarov	1895 – 1896
9.	Aleksandar Teodorov-Balan	1896 – 1897
10.	Georgi Zlatarski	1897 – 1898
11.	Ivan Georgov	1898 – 1899
12.	Nikola Dobrev	1899 – 1900
13.	Lyubomir Miletich	1900 – 1901
14.	Georgi Zlatarski	1901 – 1902
15.	Aleksandar Teodorov-Balan	1902 – 1903
16.	Boncho Boev	1903 – 1904
17.	Georgi Zlatarski	1904 – 1905
18.	Ivan Georgov	1905 – 1906
19.	Stefan Kirov	1906 – 1907
20.	Dimitar Agura	1907 – 1908
21.	Pencho Raykov	1908 – 1909
22.	Mikhail Popoviliev	1909 – 1910
23.	Benyo Stefanov Tsonev	1910 – 1911
24.	Stepan Jurinić	1911 – 1912
25.	Stefan Kirov	1912 – 1913
26.	Vasil Zlatarski	1913 – 1914
27.	Georgi Bonchev	1914 – 1915
28.	Anastas Ishirkov	1915 – 1916
29.	Ivan Georgov	1916 – 1917
30.	Georgi Shishkov	1917 – 1918
31.	Ivan Georgov	1918 – 1919
32.	Aleksandar Tsankov	1919 – 1920
33.	Methodius Popov	1920 – 1921
34.	Lyubomir Miletich	1921 – 1922
35.	Zahari Karaoglanov	1922 – 1923
36.	Vasil Mollov	1923 – 1924
37.	Vasil Zlatarski	1924 – 1925
38.	Stefan Petkov	1925 – 1925
39.	Vladimir Aleksiev	1926 – 1927
40.	Gavril Katsarov	1927 – 1928
41.	Georgi Shishkov	1928 – 1929
42.	Stefan Balamezov	1929 – 1930
43.	Stoyan Kirkovich	1930 – 1931
44.	Bogdan Filov	1931 – 1932
45.	Lyuben Dikov	1933 – 1934
46.	Vasil Mollov	1934 – 1935
47.	Michail Arnaudov	1935 – 1936
48.	Georgi Manev	1936 – 1937
49.	Georgi Genov	1937 – 1938
50.	Aleksandar Stanishev	1938 – 1939
51.	Yanaki Mollov	1939 – 1940
52.	Stefan Tsankov	1940 – 1941
53.	Stephan Angeloff	1941 – 1942
54.	Dimitŭr Katsarov	1942 – 1943
55.	Ljubomir Chakaloff	1943 – 1944
56.	Dimitŭr Silyanovski	1944
57.	Stefan Balamezov	1944 – 1945
58.	Dimitŭr Orahovac	1945 – 1947
59.	Georgi Nadjakov	1947 – 1951
60.	Vladimir I. Georgiev	1951 – 1956
61.	Daki Jordanov	1956 – 1962
62.	Dimitŭr Kosev	1962 – 1968
63.	Panteleĭ Zarev	1968 – 1972
64.	Hristo Hristov	1972 – 1973
65.	Blagovest Sendov	1973 – 1979
66.	Ilcho Dimitrov	1979 – 1981
67.	Georgi Bliznakov	1981 – 1986
68.	Mincho Semov	1986 – 1989
69.	Nikola Popov	1989 – 1991
70.	Nikolay Genchev	1991 – 1993
71.	Ivan Lalov	1993 – 1999
72.	Boyan Biolchev	1999 – 2007
73.	Ivan Ilchev	2007 – 2015
74.	Anastas Gerdzhikov	2015 –
