= Rilets Peak =

Mountain in Antarctica

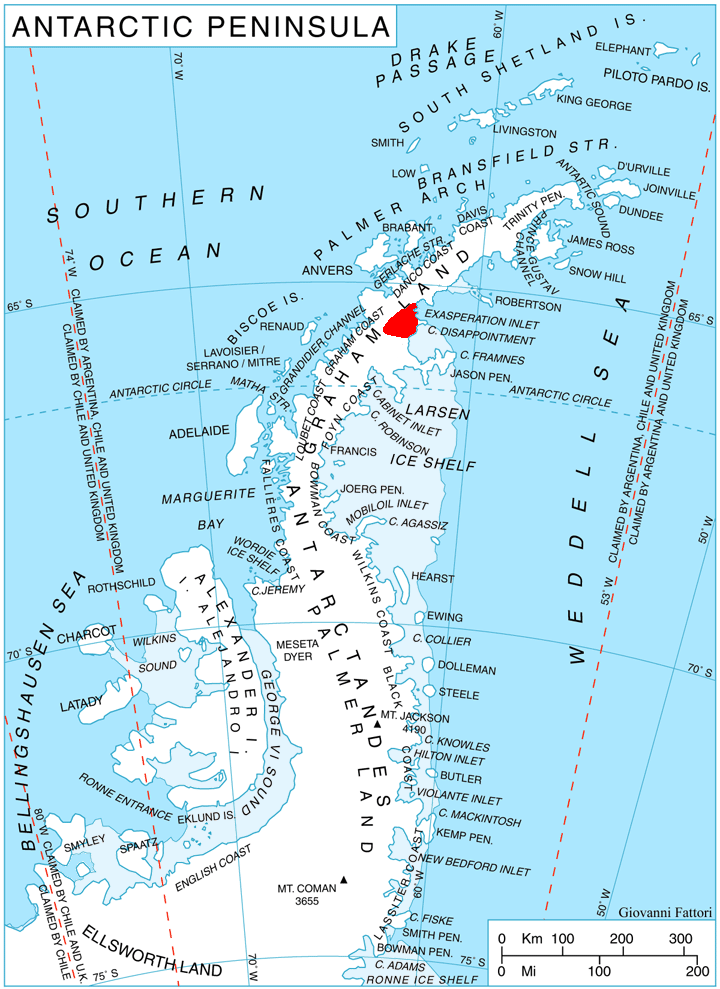
Location of Aristotle Mountains on the Antarctic Peninsula.

Rilets Peak (Bulgarian: връх Рилец, romanized: vrah Rilets, IPA: [ˈvrɤx riˈlɛt͡s]) is the rocky peak rising to 1284 m in Stevrek Ridge, Aristotle Mountains on Oscar II Coast in Graham Land, and surmounting Mapple Glacier to the north and Melville Glacier to the south. The feature is named after Rilets Peak in Rila Mountain, Bulgaria.

== Location ==
Rilets Peak is located at 65°26′28″S 62°27′31″W, which is 5.4 km south-southeast of Ishirkov Crag, 16.73 km west of Radovene Point, and 13.5 km northeast of Vrelo Peak. British mapping in 1976.

== Maps ==
- British Antarctic Territory. Scale 1:200000 topographic map. DOS 610 Series, Sheet W 65 62. Directorate of Overseas Surveys, Tolworth, UK, 1976.
- Antarctic Digital Database (ADD). Scale 1:250000 topographic map of Antarctica. Scientific Committee on Antarctic Research (SCAR), 1993–2016.
