= Vrelo Peak =

Mountain in Antarctica

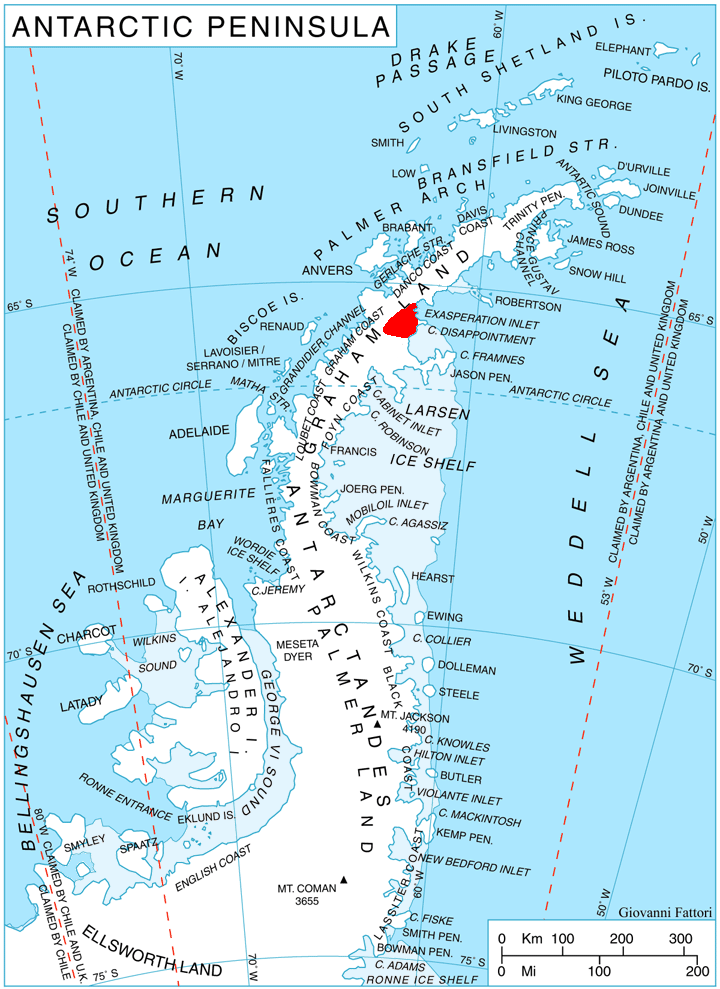
Location of Aristotle Mountains on the Antarctic Peninsula.

Vrelo Peak (Bulgarian: връх Врело, romanized: vrah Vrelo, IPA: [ˈvrɤɣ vrɛˈɫɔ]) is the rocky peak rising to 1323 m in the west part of Parlichev Ridge, Aristotle Mountains on Oscar II Coast in Graham Land, and surmounting Melville Glacier to the north and Pequod Glacier to the south. The feature is named after the settlement of Vrelo in Southern Bulgaria.

== Location ==
Vrelo Peak is located at 65°31′00″S 62°41′10″W, which is 17.35 km northeast of Madrid Dome, 13.5 km southwest of Rilets Peak, and 14.12 km northwest of Mount Mayhew. British mapping in 1976.

== Maps ==
- British Antarctic Territory. Scale 1:200000 topographic map. DOS 610 Series, Sheet W 65 62. Directorate of Overseas Surveys, Tolworth, UK, 1976.
- Antarctic Digital Database (ADD). Scale 1:250000 topographic map of Antarctica. Scientific Committee on Antarctic Research (SCAR). Since 1993, regularly upgraded and updated.
