= Radovene Point =

Location of Oscar II Coast on Antarctic Peninsula.

Radovene Point (Bulgarian: нос Радовене, ‘Nos Radovene’ \'nos ra-do-'ve-ne\) is the rocky point on the south side of the entrance to Sexaginta Prista Bay and the north side of the entrance to Domlyan Bay on Oscar II Coast in Graham Land. It is situated at the east extremity of Stevrek Ridge, and was formed as a result of the break-up of Larsen Ice Shelf in the area, and the retreat of Mapple Glacier and Melville Glacier in the early 21st century. The feature is named after the settlement of Radovene in Northwestern Bulgaria.

== Location ==
Radovene Point is located at 65°25′26″S 62°06′02″W, which is 6.47 km southwest of Delusion Point and 4.75 km north of Kalina Point. SCAR Antarctic Digital Database mapping in 2012.

== Maps ==
- Antarctic Digital Database (ADD). Scale 1:250000 topographic map of Antarctica. Scientific Committee on Antarctic Research (SCAR), 1993–2016.
