= Stevrek Ridge =

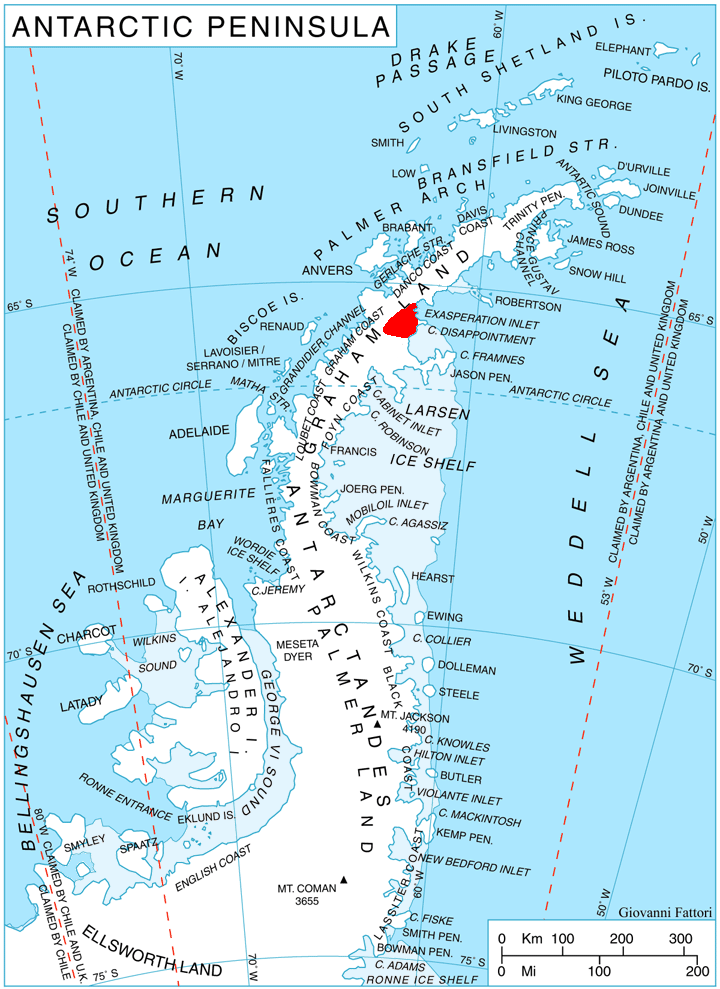
Location of Aristotle Mountains on the Antarctic Peninsula.

Stevrek Ridge (Bulgarian: хребет Стеврек, ‘Hrebet Stevrek’ \'hre-bet 'stev-rek\) is a narrow rocky ridge in Antarctica. It extends 29.9 km (18.6 mi) from the southwest part of Arkovna Ridge to the west to Radovene Point to the east, 4.1 km (2.5 mi) wide, and rising at its west extremity to 1,711 m (5,614 ft) in northern Aristotle Mountains on Oscar II Coast in Graham Land. It surmounts Mapple Glacier to the north, Sexaginta Prista Bay and Domlyan Bay to the east, and Melville Glacier to the south. The feature is named after the settlement of Stevrek in Northeastern Bulgaria.

== Location ==
Stevrek Ridge is centred at 65°26′35″S 62°25′00″W. British mapping in 1976.

== Maps ==
- British Antarctic Territory. Scale 1:200000 topographic map. DOS 610 Series, Sheet W 65 62. Directorate of Overseas Surveys, Tolworth, UK, 1976.
- Antarctic Digital Database (ADD). Scale 1:250000 topographic map of Antarctica. Scientific Committee on Antarctic Research (SCAR), 1993–2016.
