= Ishirkov Crag =

Mountain in Graham Land, Antarctica

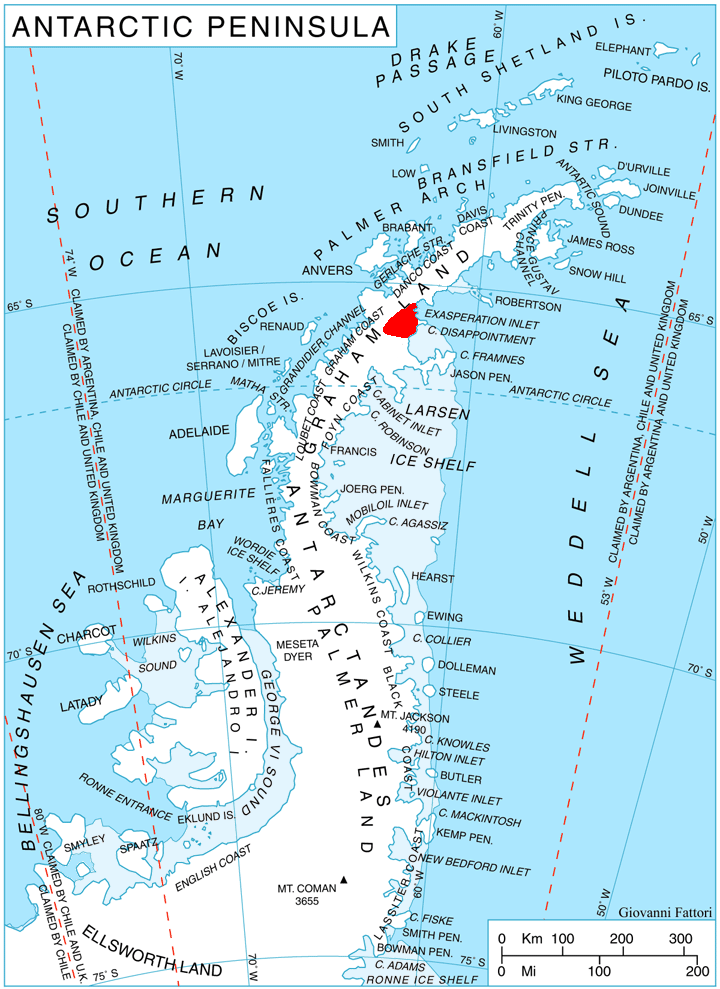
Location of Aristotle Mountains on the Antarctic Peninsula.

Ishirkov Crag (Bulgarian: Иширков камък, ‘Ishirkov Kamak’ \i-'shir-kov 'ka-m&k\) is the rocky peak rising to 1490 m in Arkovna Ridge, Aristotle Mountains on Oscar II Coast in Graham Land. It surmounts Crane Glacier to the northwest and Mapple Glacier to the southeast. The feature is named after the Bulgarian geographer Anastas Ishirkov (1868-1937), in connection with the settlement of Profesor Ishirkovo in Northeastern Bulgaria.

== Location ==
Ishirkov Crag is located at 65°23′45″S 62°30′00″W, which is 14.57 km southwest of Devetaki Peak, 23.48 km west of Delusion Point, and 5.4 km north-northwest of Rilets Peak. British mapping in 1976.

== Maps ==
- British Antarctic Territory. Scale 1:200000 topographic map. DOS 610 Series, Sheet W 65 62. Directorate of Overseas Surveys, Tolworth, UK, 1976.
- Antarctic Digital Database (ADD). Scale 1:250000 topographic map of Antarctica. Scientific Committee on Antarctic Research (SCAR). Since 1993, regularly upgraded and updated.
