= Arkovna Ridge =

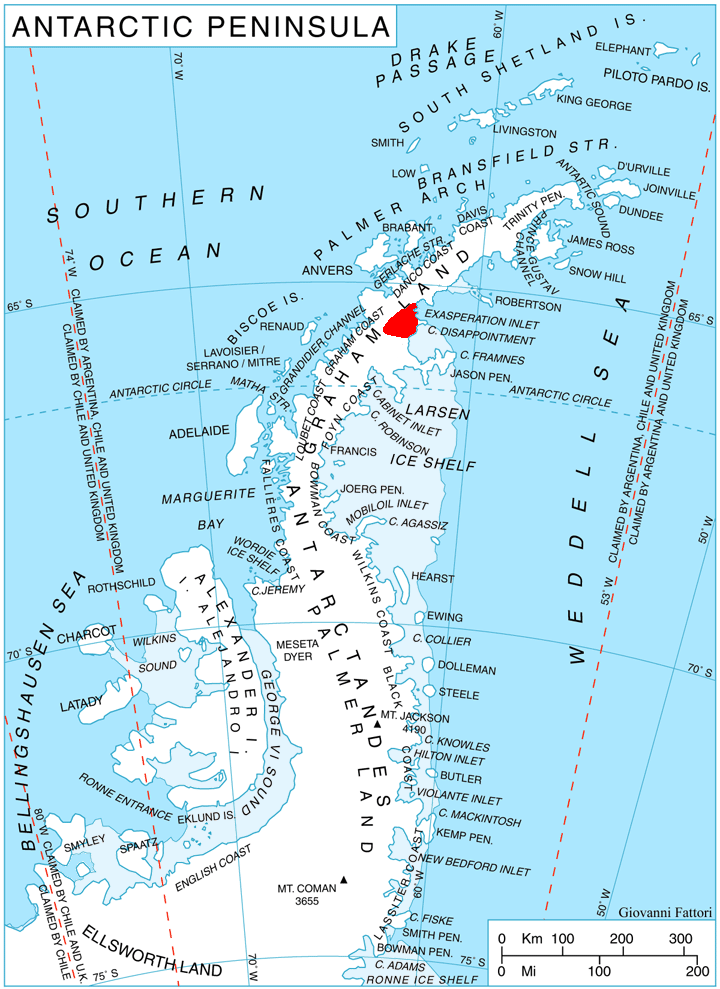
Location of Aristotle Mountains on the Antarctic Peninsula.

Arkovna Ridge (Bulgarian: Хребет Арковна, romanized: Hrebet Arkovna) is a narrow rocky ridge extending 45 km from the foothills of Madrid Dome to the southwest to Delusion Point to the east, 5.7 km wide, and rising to 1490 m (Ishirkov Crag) in northern Aristotle Mountains on Oscar II Coast in Graham Land. It surmounts Crane Glacier to the northwest and north, Spillane Fjord to the northeast, and Sexaginta Prista Bay, Mapple Glacier and the head of Melville Glacier to the south. The feature is named after the settlement of Arkovna in Northeastern Bulgaria.

== Location ==
Arkovna Ridge is centred at 65°23′40″S 62°26′30″W. British mapping in 1976.

== Maps ==
- British Antarctic Territory. Scale 1:200000 topographic map. DOS 610 Series, Sheet W 65 62. Directorate of Overseas Surveys, Tolworth, UK, 1976.
- Antarctic Digital Database (ADD). Scale 1:250000 topographic map of Antarctica. Scientific Committee on Antarctic Research (SCAR), 1993–2016.
