= Parlichev Ridge =

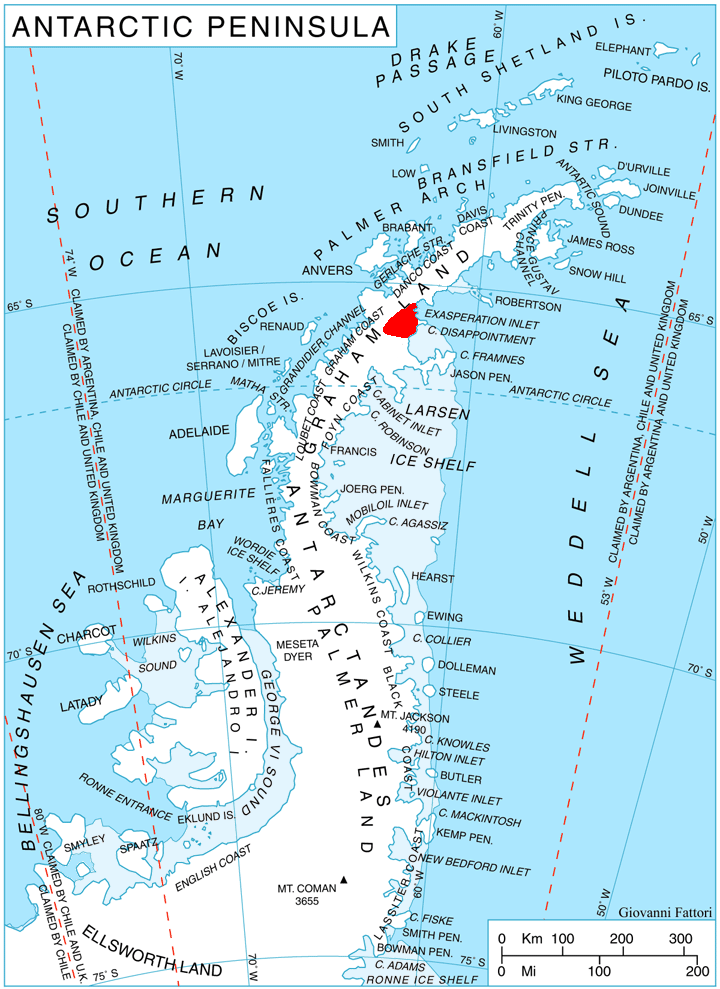
Location of Aristotle Mountains on the Antarctic Peninsula.

Parlichev Ridge (Bulgarian: Пърличев хребет, ‘Parlichev Hrebet’ \p&r-'li-chev 'hre-bet\) is the narrow rocky ridge extending 33.9 km from the foothills of Madrid Dome to the west to Kalina Point to the east, 3.8 km wide, and rising to 1323 m (Vrelo Peak) in Aristotle Mountains on Oscar II Coast in Graham Land. It surmounts Melville Glacier to the north, Domlyan Bay to the northeast, and Pequod Glacier to the south, and is intersected by a branch of Pequod Glacier flowing northwards to join Melville Glacier. The feature is named after the Bulgarian poet Grigor Parlichev (1830-1893), in connection with the settlement of Parlichevo in Northwestern Bulgaria.

== Location ==
Parlichev Ridge is centred at 65°30′14″S 62°25′52″W. British mapping in 1976.

== Maps ==
- British Antarctic Territory. Scale 1:200000 topographic map. DOS 610 Series, Sheet W 65 62. Directorate of Overseas Surveys, Tolworth, UK, 1976.
- Antarctic Digital Database (ADD). Scale 1:250000 topographic map of Antarctica. Scientific Committee on Antarctic Research (SCAR). Since 1993, regularly upgraded and updated.
