= Gerdzhikov =

Gerdzhikov (Bulgarian: Герджиков) is a surname of Bulgarian origin. Notable people with this surname include:

- Anastas Gerdzhikov (born 1963), Bulgarian classical educator
- Dimitar Gerdzhikov (born 1992), Bulgarian biathlete
- Mihail Gerdzhikov (1877–1947), Bulgarian anarchist
- Ognyan Gerdzhikov (born 1946), Bulgarian politician and jurist
