= Kalina Point =

Location of Oscar II Coast on Antarctic Peninsula.

Kalina Point (Bulgarian: нос Калина, ‘Nos Kalina’ \'nos ka-'li-na\) is the rocky point on the south side of the entrance to Domlyan Bay on Oscar II Coast in Graham Land. It is situated at the east extremity of Parlichev Ridge, and was formed as a result of the break-up of Larsen Ice Shelf in the area, and the retreat of Melville Glacier in the early 21st century. The feature is named after the settlements of Kalina in Northwestern and Northeastern Bulgaria.

== Location ==
Kalina Point is located at 65°27′56″S 62°04′44″W, which is 4.75 km south of Radovene Point and 7.5 km northwest of Sandilh Point. SCAR Antarctic Digital Database mapping in 2012.

== Maps ==
- Antarctic Digital Database (ADD). Scale 1:250000 topographic map of Antarctica. Scientific Committee on Antarctic Research (SCAR). Since 1993, regularly upgraded and updated.
