= Mount Ahab =

Mountain in Antarctica

Coordinates: 65°26′S 62°11′W

Location of Oscar II Coast on Antarctic Peninsula.

Mount Ahab is a conspicuous mountain 925 metres (3,035 ft) high that rises between the lower ends of Mapple Glacier and Melville Glacier on the east coast of Graham Land. The mountain was roughly surveyed in 1947 by Falkland Islands Dependencies Survey and was resurveyed in 1955. The name was repositioned following a survey by the British Antarctic Survey in 1962. It was named by the United Kingdom Antarctic Place-Names Committee after Captain Ahab of the whaler Pequod - the central character in Herman Melville's 1851 novel Moby-Dick.
