= Bliznakov =

Bliznakov is a Bulgarian surname. Notable people with the surname include:

- Georgi Bliznakov (1920–2004), Bulgarian chemist
- Mario Bliznakov (born 1982), Bulgarian footballer
- Milka Bliznakov (1927–2010), Bulgarian architect
- Nikolay Bliznakov (born 1950), Bulgarian journalist, publicist and politician
- Veselin Bliznakov (born 1944), Bulgarian politician
