= Georgi Shishkov =

Bulgarian zoologist

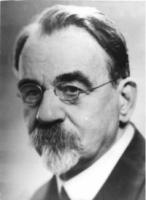
- Born: 10 September 1865; Sliven
- Died: 1 January 1943 (aged 77); Sofia
- Citizenship: Bulgarian
- Education: University of Geneva
- Scientific career
- Fields: zoology hydrobiology
- Workplaces: Sofia University

Georgi Dimitrov Shishkov (Bulgarian: Георги Димитров Шишков; 10 September 1865 – 1 January 1943) was a Bulgarian zoologist, hydrobiologist, and a corresponding member of the Bulgarian Academy of Sciences.

== Biography ==
Georgi Shishov was born in the town of Sliven on 10 September 1865. In 1892, he received his doctorate in natural sciences from the University of Geneva. After returning to Bulgaria, he worked as a teacher in Tarnovo and Plovdiv. In 1895, he became the first full-time associate professor of zoology at the Sofia University. From 1895 to 1897, Shishkov specialized in hydrobiology at the Stazione Zoologica Anton Dohrn in Naples. In 1898, he founded the Zoological Institute at Sofia University. In 1903, he was elected the first Bulgarian professor of zoology. From 1909 to 1935, he was head of the Department of Anatomy and Systematics of Invertebrates. In 1913–1914 and 1920–1921, Shishov was dean of the Faculty of Physics and Mathematics, and in 1917–1918 and 1928–1929 served as the Rector of Sofia University. In 1936, he became an honorary member of the Bulgarian Natural History Society. He died in Sofia on 1 January 1943.

== Research ==
Georgi Shishkov was the founder of hydrobiology in Bulgaria. He studied the fauna of the Black Sea, freshwater crustaceans, and fish. His scientific works include Two new species for Bulgarian herpetology // Yearbook of Sofia University. Faculty of Physics and Mathematics. Book 2. (1914); Contribution to the Study of the Fauna of the Black Sea (1912); On the Ichthyofauna of the Kamchia River (1934); On Several New and Little-Known Autoctonous Freshwater Fish (1939), etc.

== Sources ==
- Great Bulgarian Encyclopedia, Volume 12 (in Bulgarian). Trud Press. 2012. ISBN 9789548104340.
