= Lovech =

City in Bulgaria

Lovech Ловеч
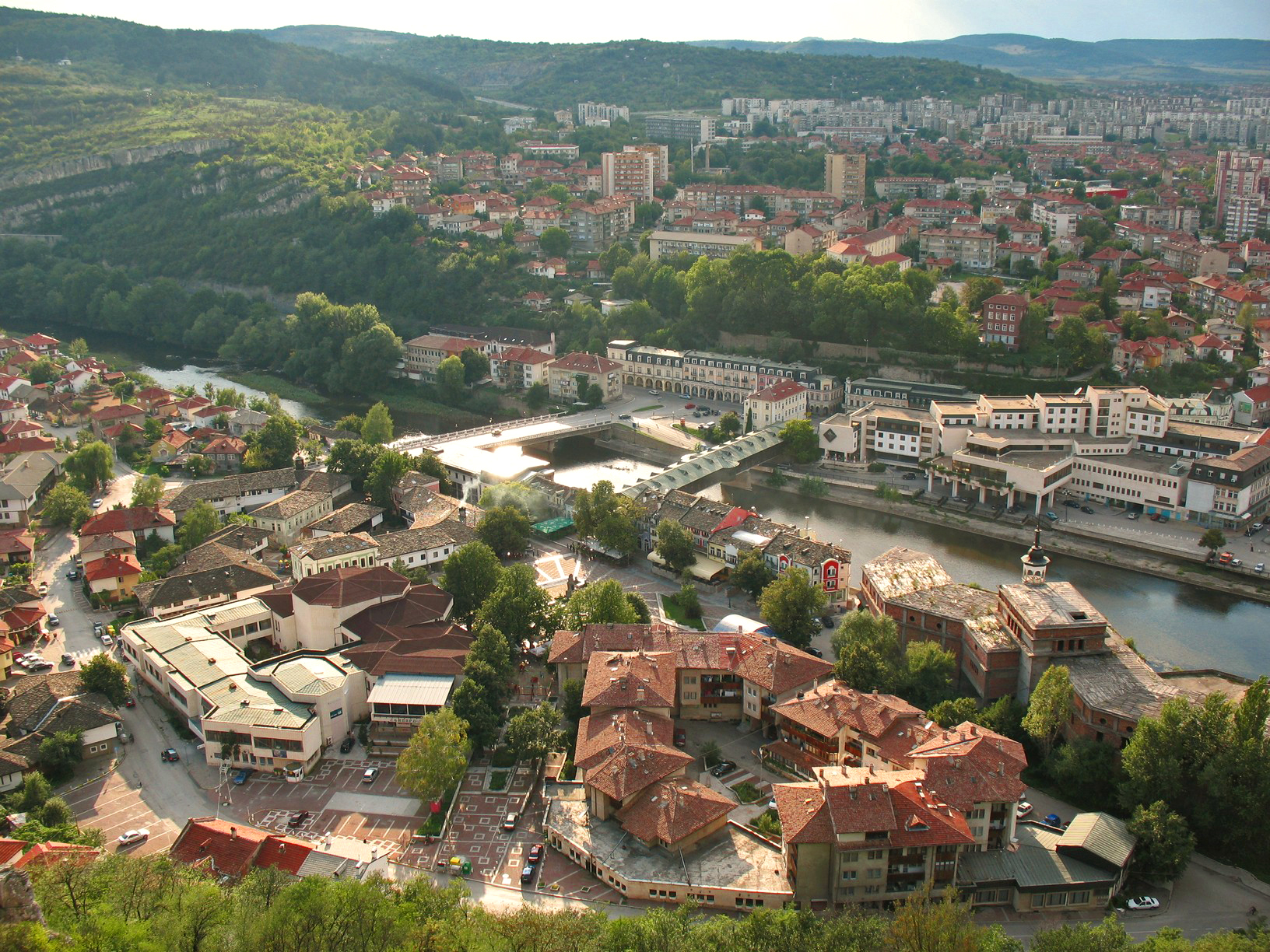

- Flag Coat of arms

- Location of Lovech
- Coordinates: 43°08′05″N 24°43′02″E
- Country: Bulgaria
- Province (Oblast): Lovech

Government
  - Mayor: Stratsimir Petkov

Area
  - City: 70.001 km^{2} (27.028 sq mi)
- Elevation: 200 m (660 ft)

Population (2022)
  - City: 27,910
  - Urban: 37,448
- Time zone: UTC+2 (EET)
  - Summer (DST): UTC+3 (EEST)
- Postal Code: 5500
- Area code: 068

Lovech (Bulgarian: Ловеч, romanized: Lovech, pronounced [ˈɫɔvɛt͡ʃ]) is a city in north-central Bulgaria. It is the administrative centre of the Lovech Province and of the subordinate Lovech Municipality. The city is located about 150 kilometres (93 miles) northeast of the capital city of Sofia. Near Lovech are the towns of Pleven, Troyan and Teteven.

== Name ==
The name is possibly derived from the Slavic root lov, "hunting" + the Slavic suffix -ech.

== Geography ==
Lovech is situated in the Forebalkan area of northern Bulgaria, on both sides of the river Osam, and unifies both mountainous and plain relief. The eastern part of the town is surrounded by a 250 m high plateau, where the largest park in Lovech, Stratesh, is located, and the southwestern part is surrounded by the hills Hisarya and Bash Bunar. In the northwest the relief gradually changes to the plains of the neighbouring Pleven Province. The average altitude of Lovech is about 200 m above mean sea level. The highest point of the town is Akbair Hill at 450 m.

In Stratesh Park, the highest place in the town, there are many lilac bushes. Due to this, Lovech is known as the town of the lilacs.

Climate data for Lovech (1991-2020), Station height: 220 m
Month	Jan	Feb	Mar	Apr	May	Jun	Jul	Aug	Sep	Oct	Nov	Dec	Year
Record high °C (°F)	22.0 (71.6)	25.0 (77.0)	30.0 (86.0)	33.1 (91.6)	34.0 (93.2)	39.8 (103.6)	43.3 (109.9)	41.3 (106.3)	39.0 (102.2)	37.6 (99.7)	28.5 (83.3)	22.6 (72.7)	43.3 (109.9)
Mean daily maximum °C (°F)	4.9 (40.8)	7.8 (46.0)	12.8 (55.0)	18.6 (65.5)	23.6 (74.5)	27.6 (81.7)	30.0 (86.0)	30.6 (87.1)	25.4 (77.7)	18.8 (65.8)	11.5 (52.7)	6.1 (43.0)	18.1 (64.7)
Daily mean °C (°F)	0.3 (32.5)	2.4 (36.3)	6.8 (44.2)	11.9 (53.4)	16.8 (62.2)	20.8 (69.4)	22.9 (73.2)	22.7 (72.9)	17.8 (64.0)	12.2 (54.0)	6.5 (43.7)	1.6 (34.9)	11.9 (53.4)
Mean daily minimum °C (°F)	−3.2 (26.2)	−1.7 (28.9)	2.2 (36.0)	6.7 (44.1)	11.4 (52.5)	15.1 (59.2)	16.9 (62.4)	16.6 (61.9)	12.5 (54.5)	7.8 (46.0)	3.0 (37.4)	−1.7 (28.9)	7.1 (44.8)
Record low °C (°F)	−20.0 (−4.0)	−19.7 (−3.5)	−20.0 (−4.0)	−2.9 (26.8)	1.2 (34.2)	2.2 (36.0)	8.0 (46.4)	7.7 (45.9)	1.2 (34.2)	−4.9 (23.2)	−15.8 (3.6)	−22.0 (−7.6)	−22.0 (−7.6)
Average precipitation mm (inches)	37 (1.5)	40 (1.6)	48 (1.9)	55 (2.2)	75 (3.0)	74 (2.9)	84 (3.3)	46 (1.8)	57 (2.2)	51 (2.0)	39 (1.5)	45 (1.8)	651 (25.7)
Average precipitation days (≥ 1.0 mm)	7	6	8	8	10	9	7	5	6	6	6	7	85
Source: NOAA NCEI, Meteomanz (extremes since 2021)

=== Population ===
According to the census, held in February, 2011, Lovech is populated by 36,600 inhabitants within city limits. In the 1880s the population of Lovech numbered about 7,000. Since then it started growing decade by decade, mostly because of the migrants from the rural areas and the surrounding smaller towns, with a peak in the period 1987-1991 when it exceeded 50,000 residents. After this time, the population has started decreasing rapidly in consequence of the poor economic situation in the Bulgarian provinces during the 1990s that led to a new migration in the direction of the country capital Sofia and abroad.

Lovech
Year	1887	1910	1934	1946	1956	1965	1975	1985	1992	2001	2005	2009	2011	2021
Population	7,008	8,421	9,420	11,829	17,901	30,951	43,967	48,882	48,267	44,146	40,824	38,579	36,600	29,659
	Highest number 51,945 in 1991													
Sources: National Statistical Institute, citypopulation.de, pop-stat.mashke.org, Bulgarian Academy of Sciences

=== Ethnic, linguistic, and religious composition ===
According to the latest 2011 census data, the individuals who declared their ethnic identity were distributed as follows:

- Bulgarians: 32,706 (95.2%)
- Turks: 919 (2.7%)
- Romani: 411 (1.2%)
- Others: 120 (0.3%)
- Indefinable: 201 (0.6%)
  - Undeclared: 2,243 (6.1%)

Total: 36,600

The ethnic composition of Lovech Municipality is 43,223 Bulgarians, 2,321 Turks, and 665 Romani among others.

Following the census of 1926 Professor Anastas Ishirkov noted the homogeneity of the population which is 95% of Bulgarian origin.

== History ==
=== Ancient history ===
Lovech is one of the oldest towns in Bulgaria. Traces of human activities from very ancient times were found in the region, mainly in the caves near the town. The reason was the comfortable location between the mountains and the flat country, and the presence of a river.

The first inhabitants of the town were the Thracian tribe of the Meldi, whose traces date back to the 4th or 3rd centuries BC. They founded their capital, called Melta, in the area, which was situated at the place of today's neighbourhood and architecture reserve Varosha. Later, when the Balkans were occupied by the Roman Empire, a military station called Prezidium was founded near the modern town, which was situated at an important strategic position on one of the main Roman roads. Parts of this road are to be seen in the territory of Lovech today.

=== Middle Ages ===
The former Roman citadel Hisarya, which is situated on the hill of the same name, was the place where in 1187 the peace treaty between the Bulgarian Empire and the Byzantine Empire was signed and the returning of Bulgaria on the European map was officially declared, marking the beginning of the Second Bulgarian Empire. In the 12th century, Lovech was a great trade centre and one of the most famous towns in Bulgaria. Ivan Alexander was appointed to govern the city by 1330, most likely being appointed due to Lovech being a major city that controlled commercial passage through the Stara Planina passes, and the migration of intellectuals to Moldavia and Wallachia, due to Ottoman conquests, resulting in the beginning of the Despotate of Lovech.

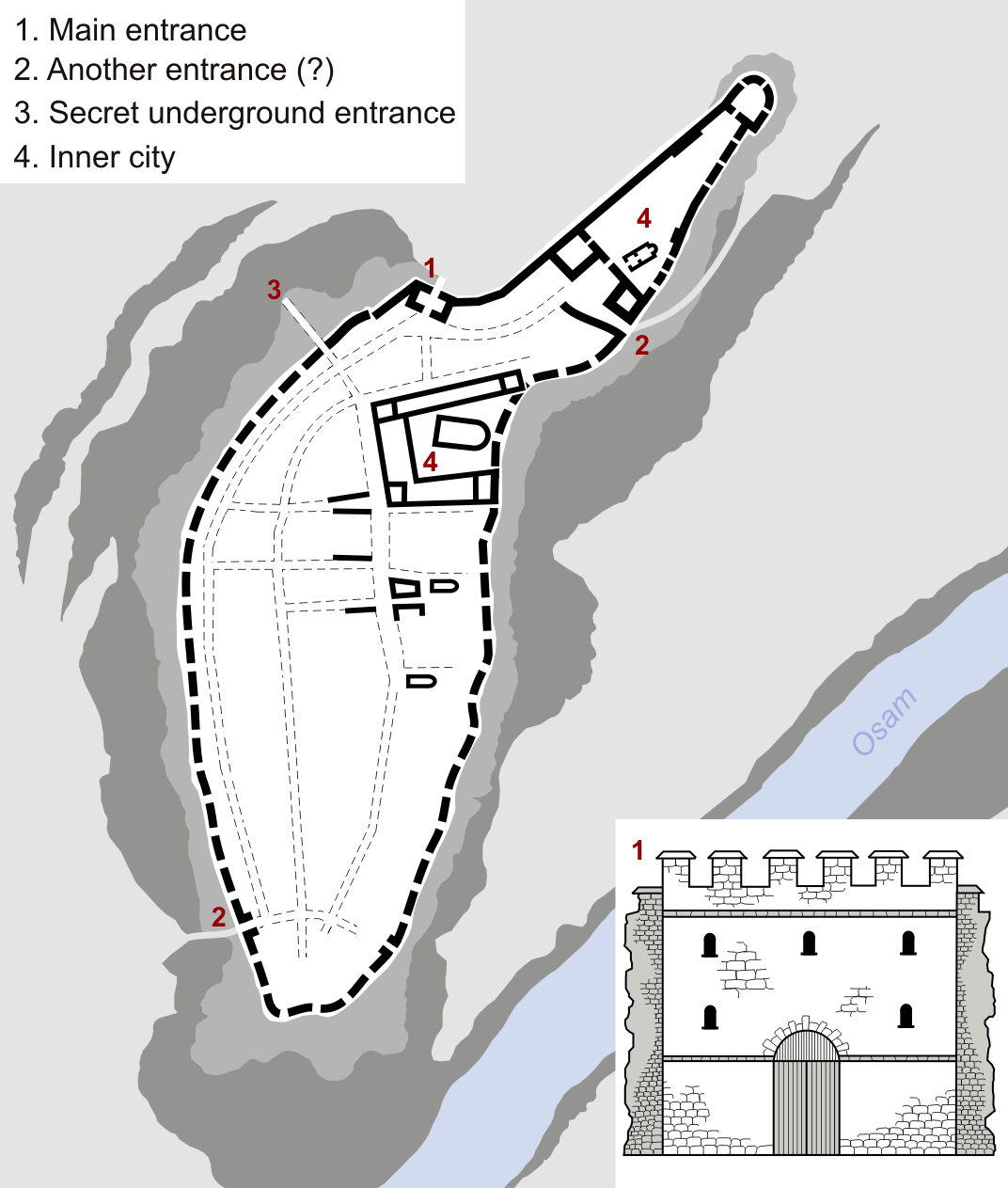
Plan of the medieval fortress of Lovech

The Turkish invasion in the middle of the 14th century did not pass the town, but the Hisarya fortress was captured last of all, in 1446.

=== Ottoman rule ===
For a long time after conquest, the town enjoyed some privileges such as a prohibition on Turkish people to settle in the town or to take Bulgarian children as janissaries.

In the 17th century, Lovech (Lofça in Turkish) was once again an important trade centre and one of the richest towns in Bulgaria, a reason for the town being called Altın Lofça (Golden Lovech, from Turkish) at the time.

In the times of revolutionary organisations against the Ottoman rule, Lovech was the centre of operations of the Internal Revolutionary Organisation of Vasil Levski, called the Secret Revolutionary Committee. He was arrested by the Turkish military in a village near Lovech called Kakrina and later hanged in Sofia. The biggest museum of Vasil Levski in Bulgaria, which contains several personal items such as notebooks, clothes, and weapons. It is situated in the old town part of Lovech.

Between 1872 and 1874, the Bulgarian master-builder Nikola Fichev, known also as Kolyu Ficheto, built the famous Covered Bridge (Покрит мост) over the river Osam, the only one of its kind in the Balkans. The bridge was burned out in 1925, but rebuilt in 1931. Now it connects the new and the old part of the town and it's full of cafes, small restaurants and many souvenir shops.

During the Russo-Turkish War of 1877–1878, an important battle was held at Lovech, known as the Battle of Lovcha. The war and several plagues and migrations in Wallachia drastically reduced the population. There was a substantial number of victims from the Bulgarian population. Many Turkish families were expelled by the Russian army and the Muslims of Lovech known to be "Lofçalılar" have immigrated to several parts of Turkey (mainly Istanbul, Edirne and Bursa).

=== Modern times ===
In more recent times, Lovech was the place where modern foreign language education in Bulgaria started. Taking over from the American college established there in 1881, the first foreign language school in Bulgaria was set up in Lovech in 1950. Initially three languages were taught in this school: English, French and German. However soon after that the teaching of English and French was moved to Sofia and Varna respectively, founding the first language schools in these cities: the First English Language School in Sofia in 1954 and the French Language School in Varna in 1958. Since for the period 1959-1984 German was the only language taught, the school in Lovech was informally known as The German School (Немската гимназия).

== Economy ==
On April 9, 2009, Great Wall Motor and the Bulgarian company Litex Motors signed a contract for building a production base that would manufacture three models of the Chinese manufacturer near Lovech. The new plant was opened on February 21, 2012.

The investment is worth around 97 million euros and will create 2,000 new jobs over the first four years. It will be Great Wall Motor's gate of entering the European Union market, thanks to the zero tariff levels.

== Main sights ==
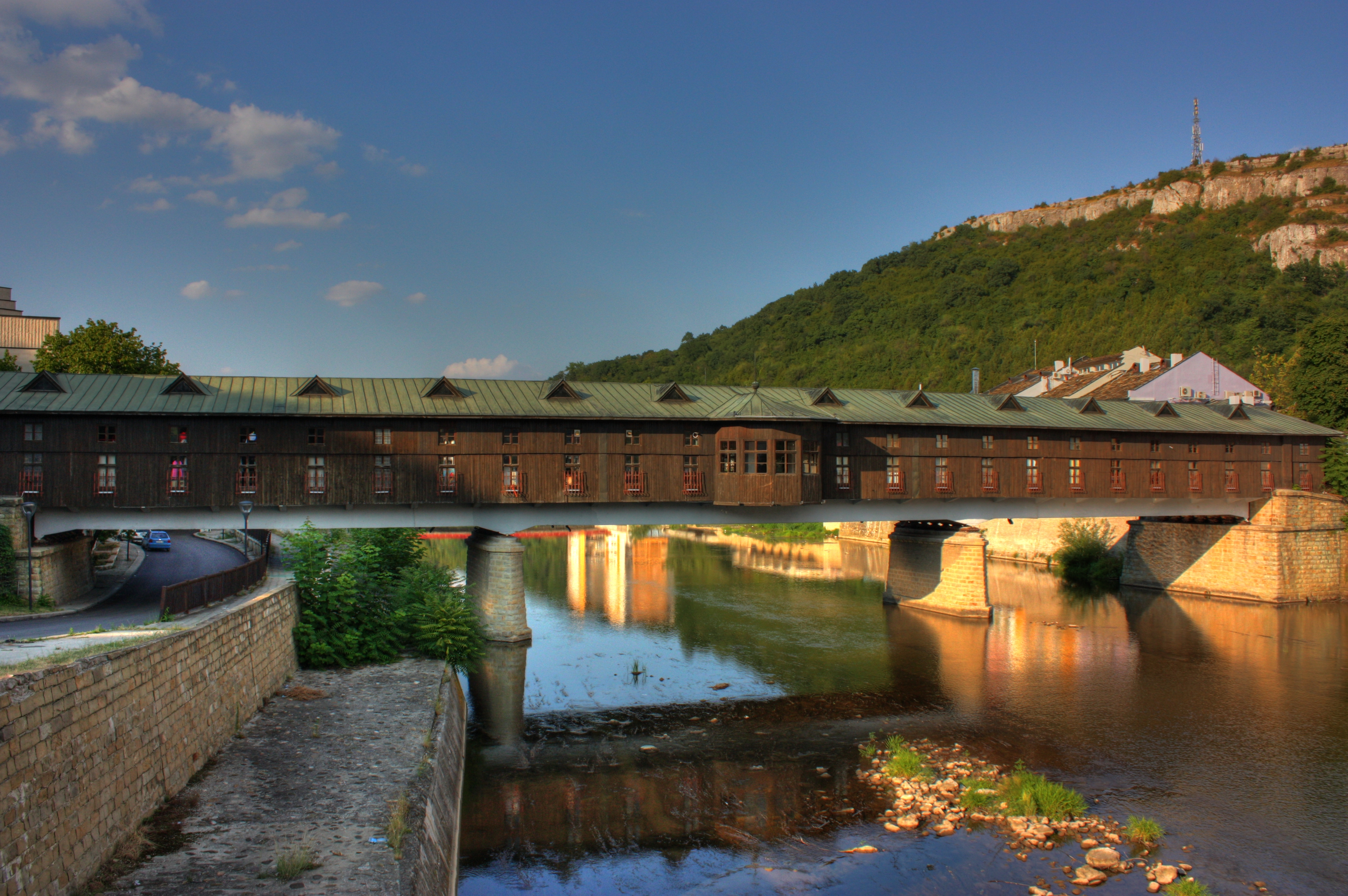
The Covered Bridge connecting the two parts of town.

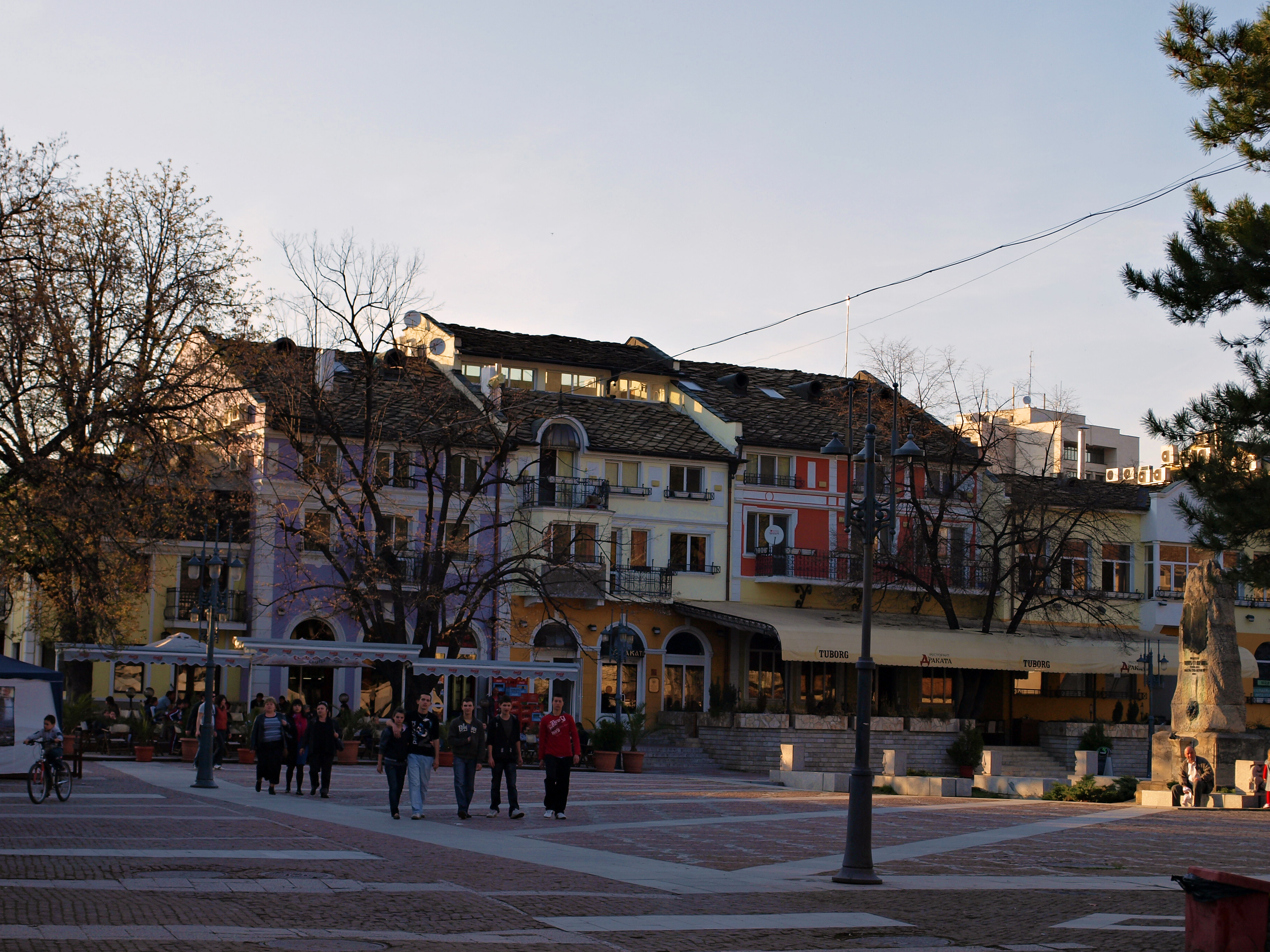
Buildings along the Osam

Semi-Panoramic photo of the Russo-Turkish War monument in Lovech before its restoration in 2017.

- The Covered Bridge by Kolyu Ficheto
- The monument of Vasil Levski
- The monuments to Russian soldiers killed in the Russo-Turkish War of 1877-78
- The Varosha old town part
- Stratesh Park with Lovech Zoo, the biggest zoo in the province
- Bash Bunar Park
- The baroque buildings in the town's central parts
- The Varosha architectural and historical reserve, with Drasova and Rashova memorial houses

=== Theatres ===
- Lovech Drama Theatre
- Theatre by the Nauka Community Centre
- The summer theatre in Stratesh Park

=== Museums ===
- Museum of Vasil Levski
- Lovech Historical Museum
- Drasova Memorial House
- Rashova Memorial House
- Saint Kliment Ohridski School

== Sports ==
- PFC Litex Lovech, one of Bulgaria's top football clubs
- Osam, a men's handball club
- Lovech '98, a women's handball club
- Eagles, a baseball club
- A wrestling club
- A kyokushin karate club
- Progress, a chess club
- Fencing club
- Acrobatic rock’n’roll club “Rocksmile”

== Notable people ==
- Joseph I of Bulgaria — Bulgarian exarch
- Georgi Ivanov — the first Bulgarian cosmonaut
- Dimitar Dimov — Bulgarian author
- Simeon Djankov — economist
- Anastas Ishirkov — noted geographer
- Panayot Pipkov — composer
- Ahmed Cevdet Pasha — Ottoman scholar, intellectual, bureaucrat, administrator, and historian

== Partner towns ==
- Berat, Albania
- Erfurt, Germany
- Iziaslav, Ukraine
- Kolašin, Montenegro
- Laval, France
- Lotoshino, Russia
- Ryazan, Russia
- Syktyvkar, Russia
- Valladolid, Spain

- Florence

== Honours ==
Lovech Heights in Graham Land, Antarctica is named after the city, and Melta Point on Livingston Island in the South Shetland Islands, Antarctica is named after the ancient Melta.

== Gallery ==
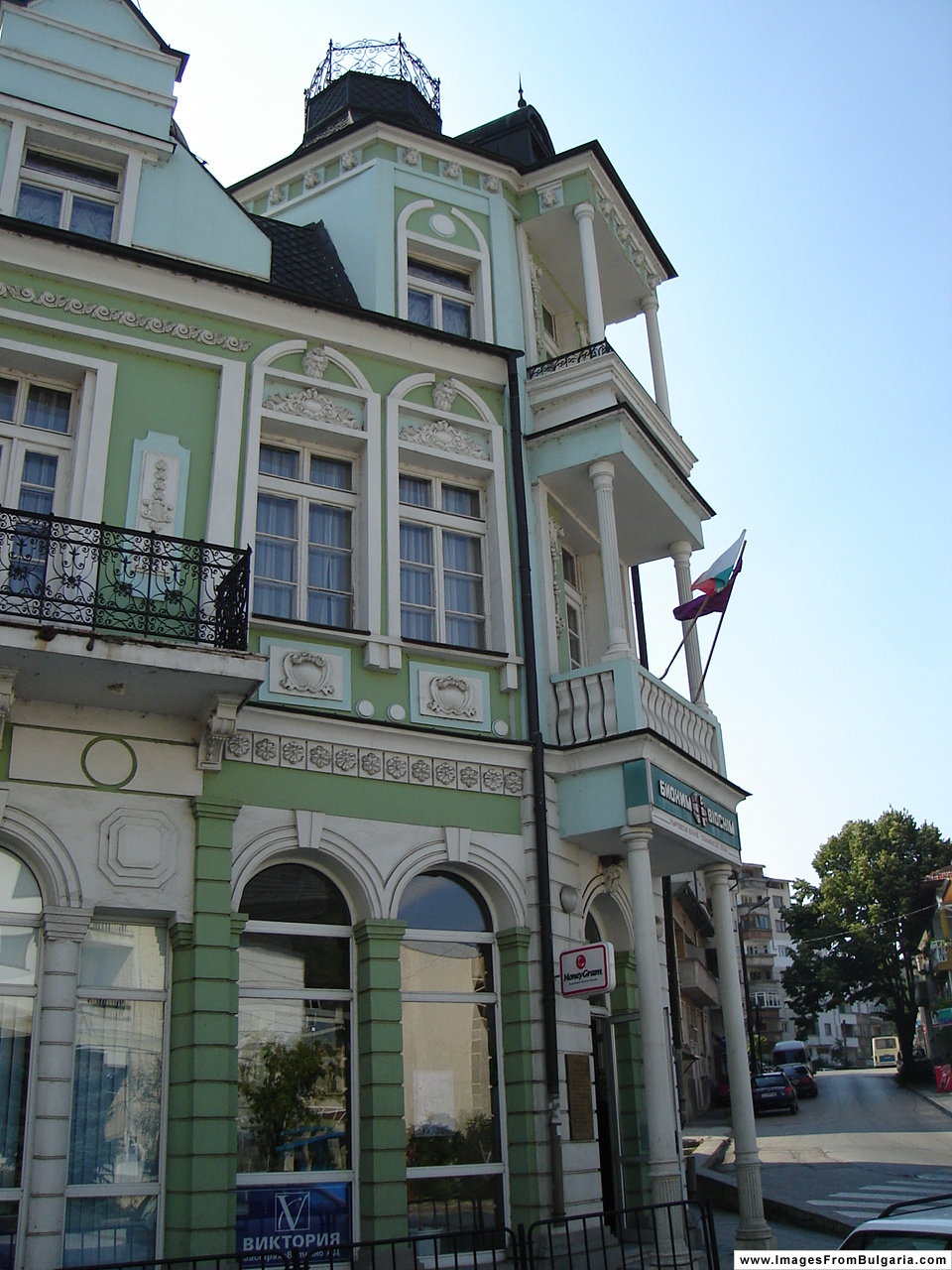
Central Lovech

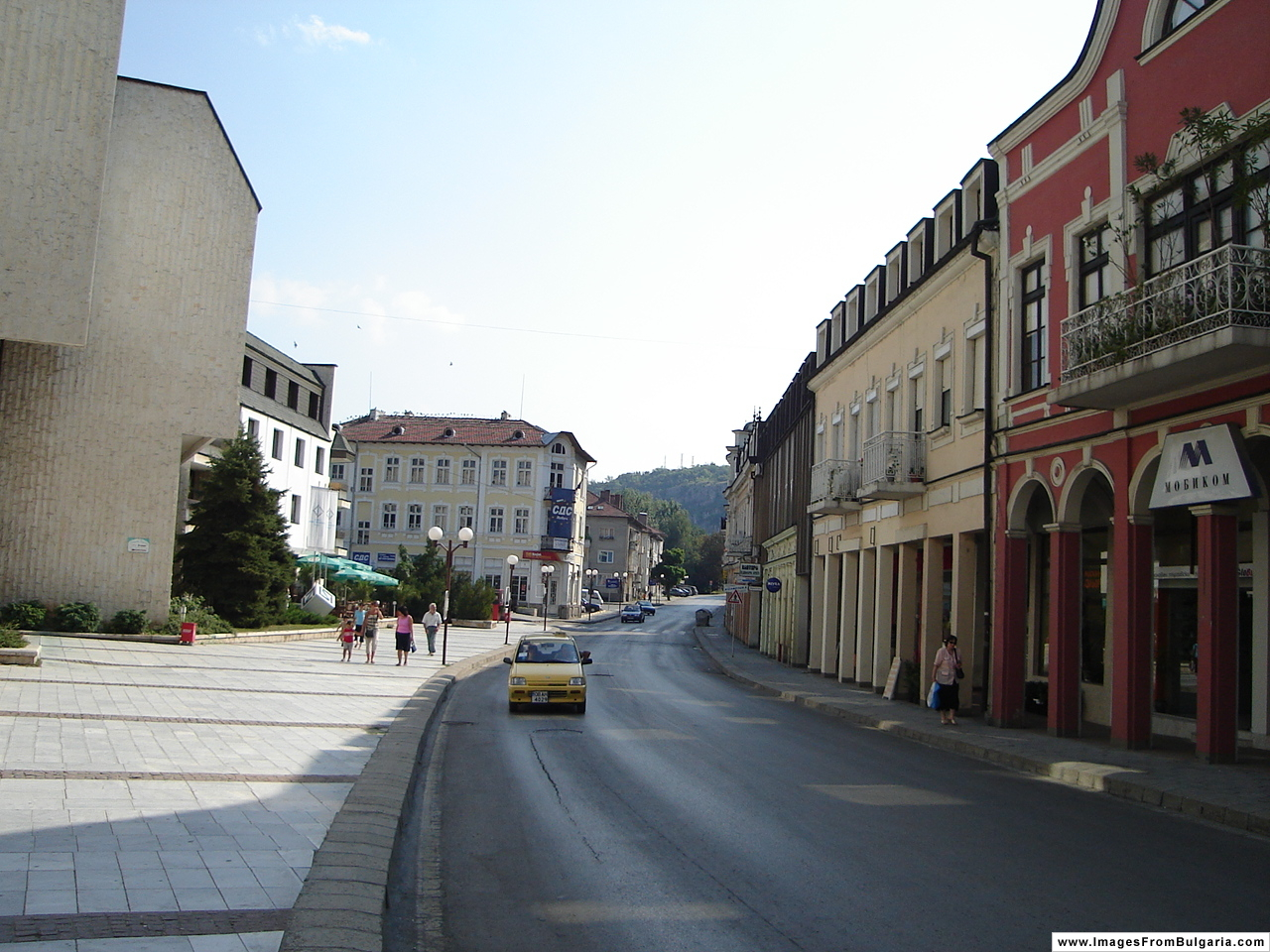
Central Lovech

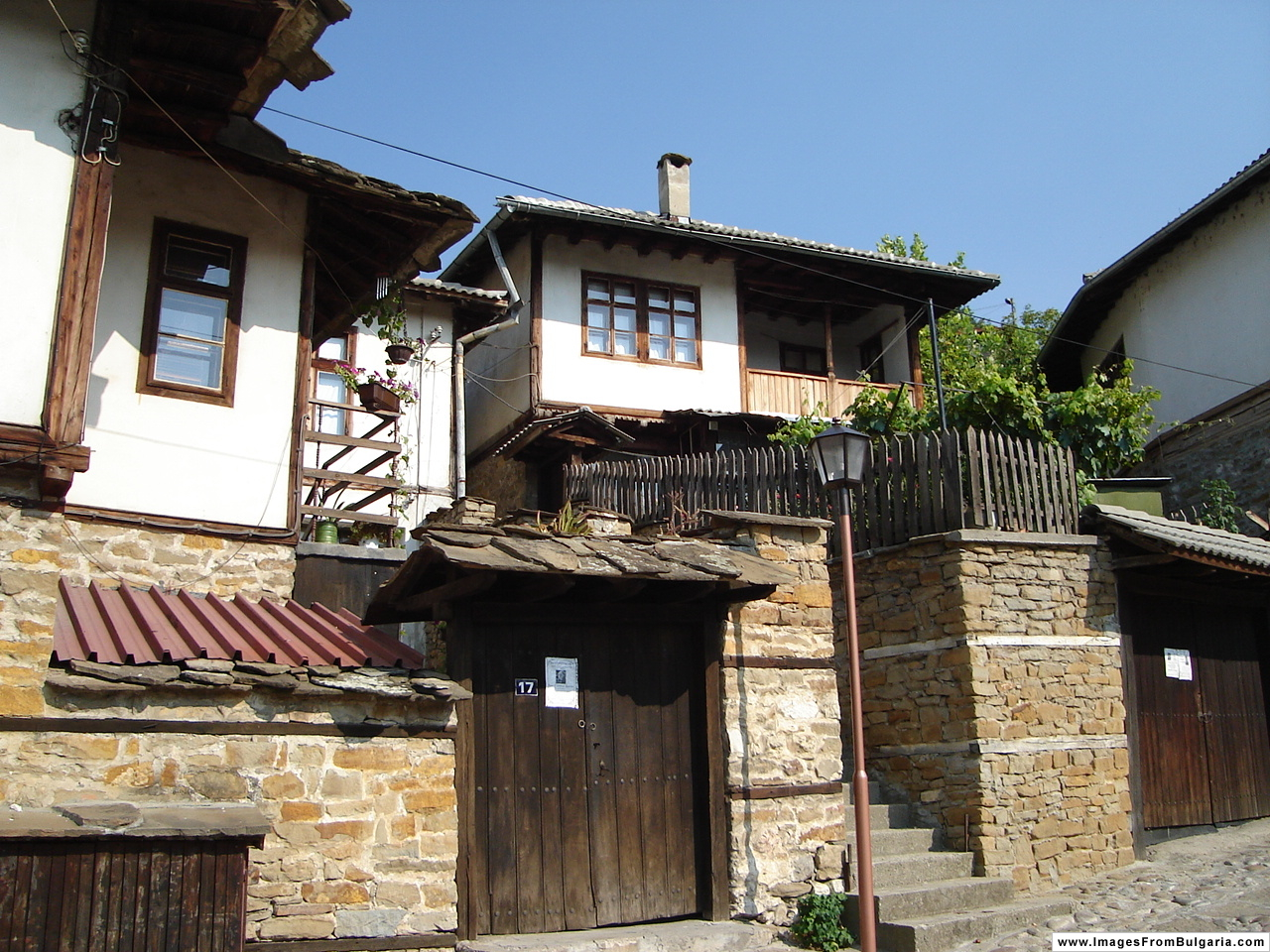
Bulgarian National Revival quarter, Varosha

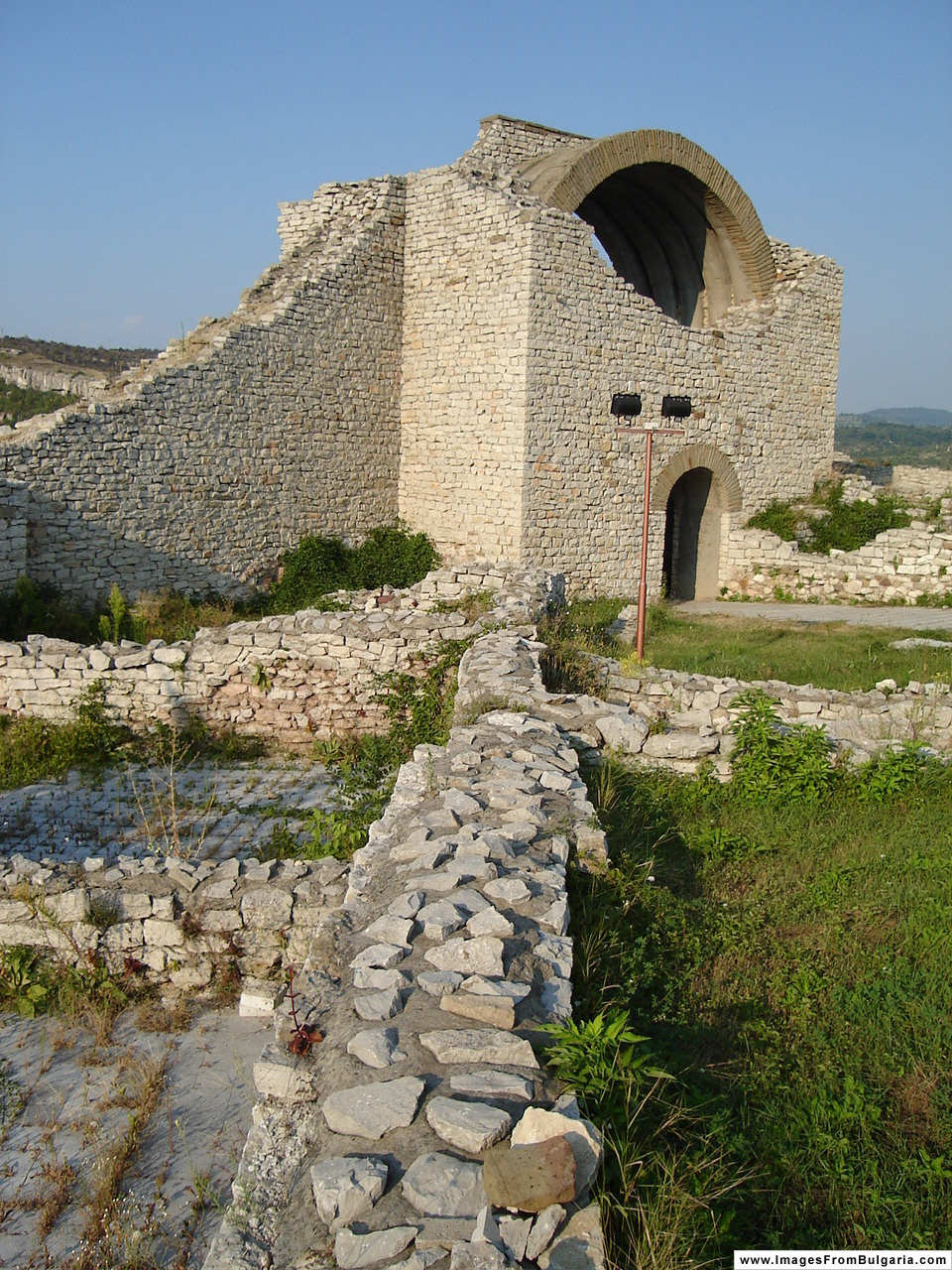
The Hisarya Fortress

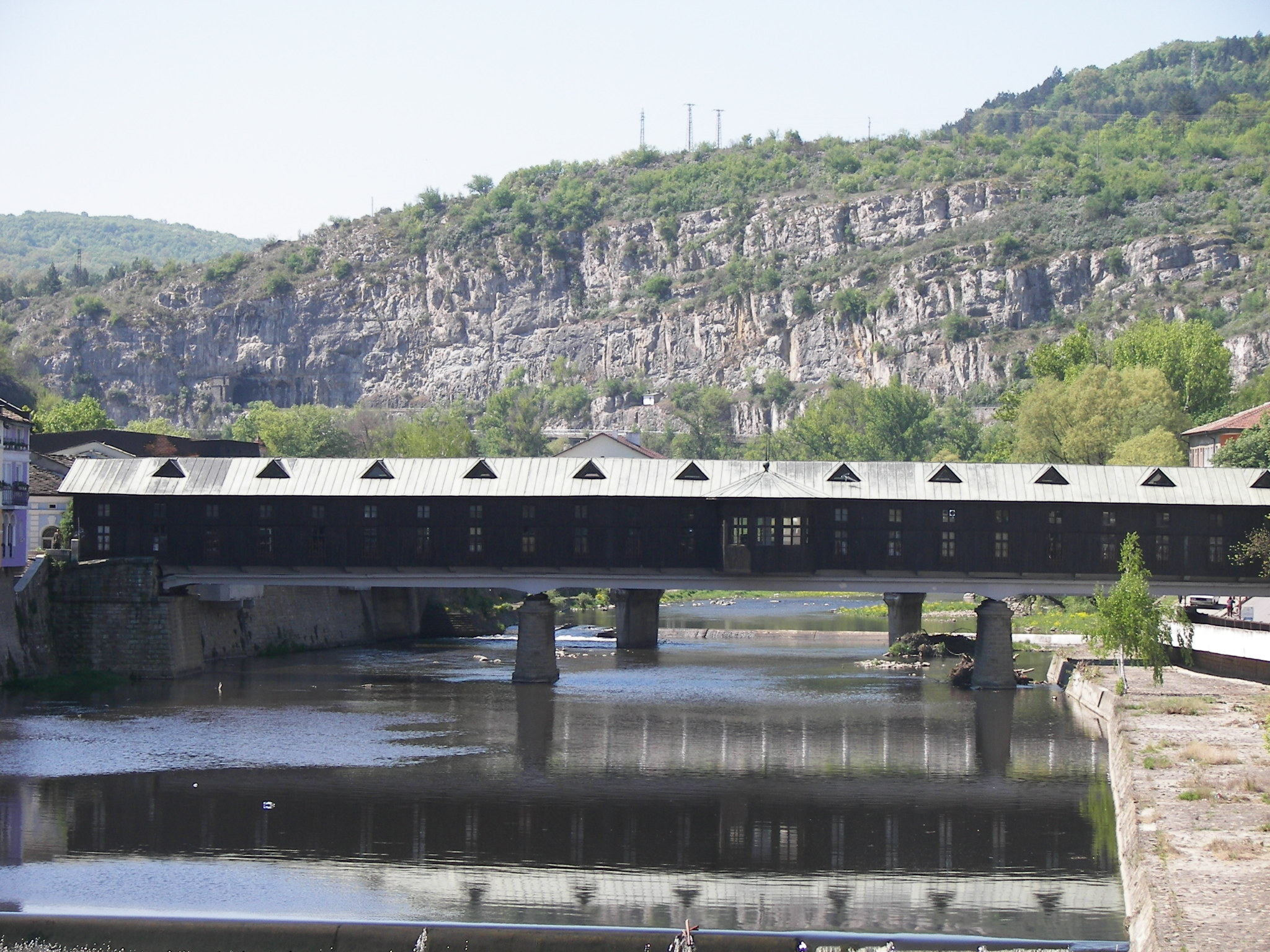
The Covered Bridge

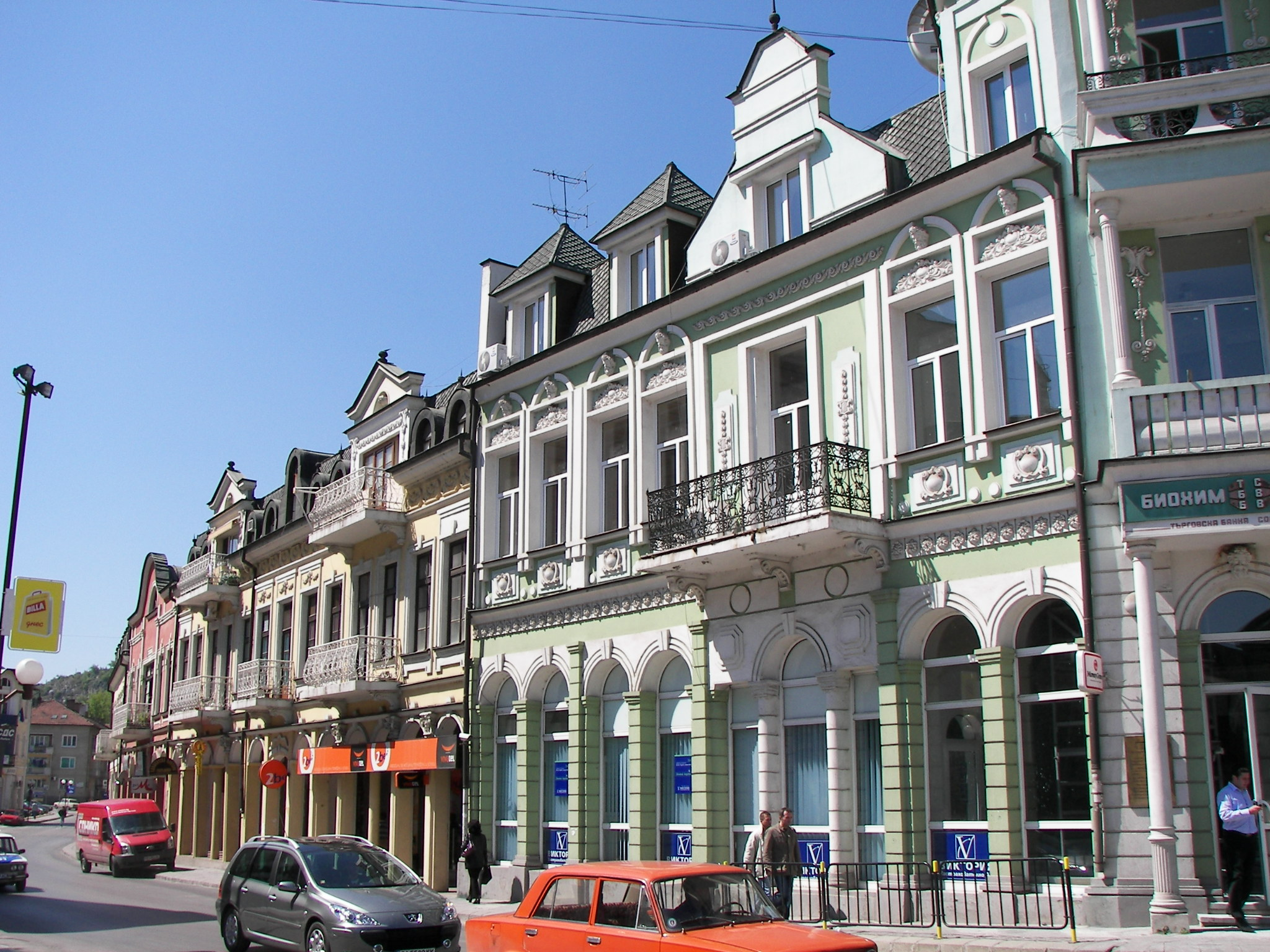

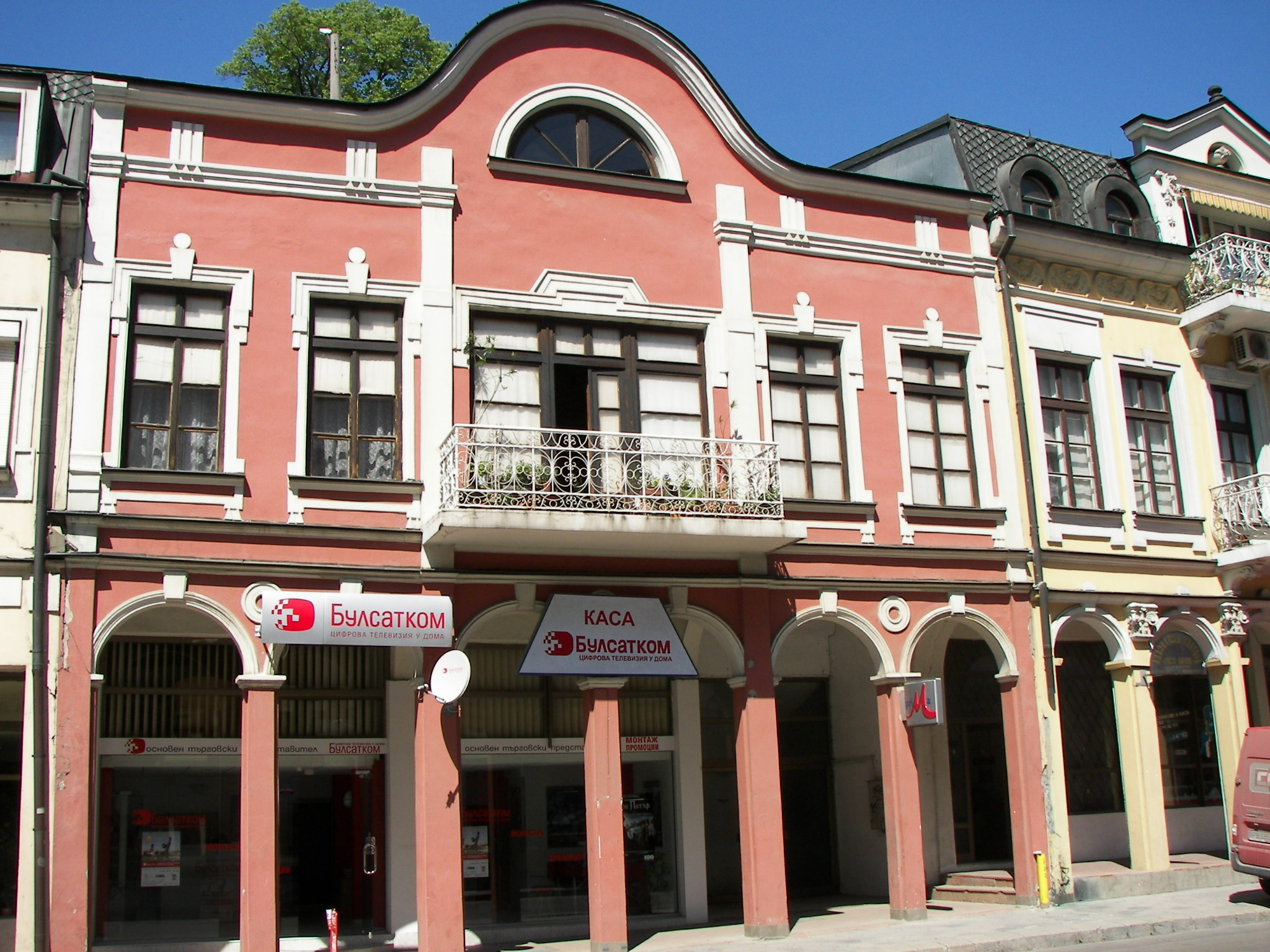

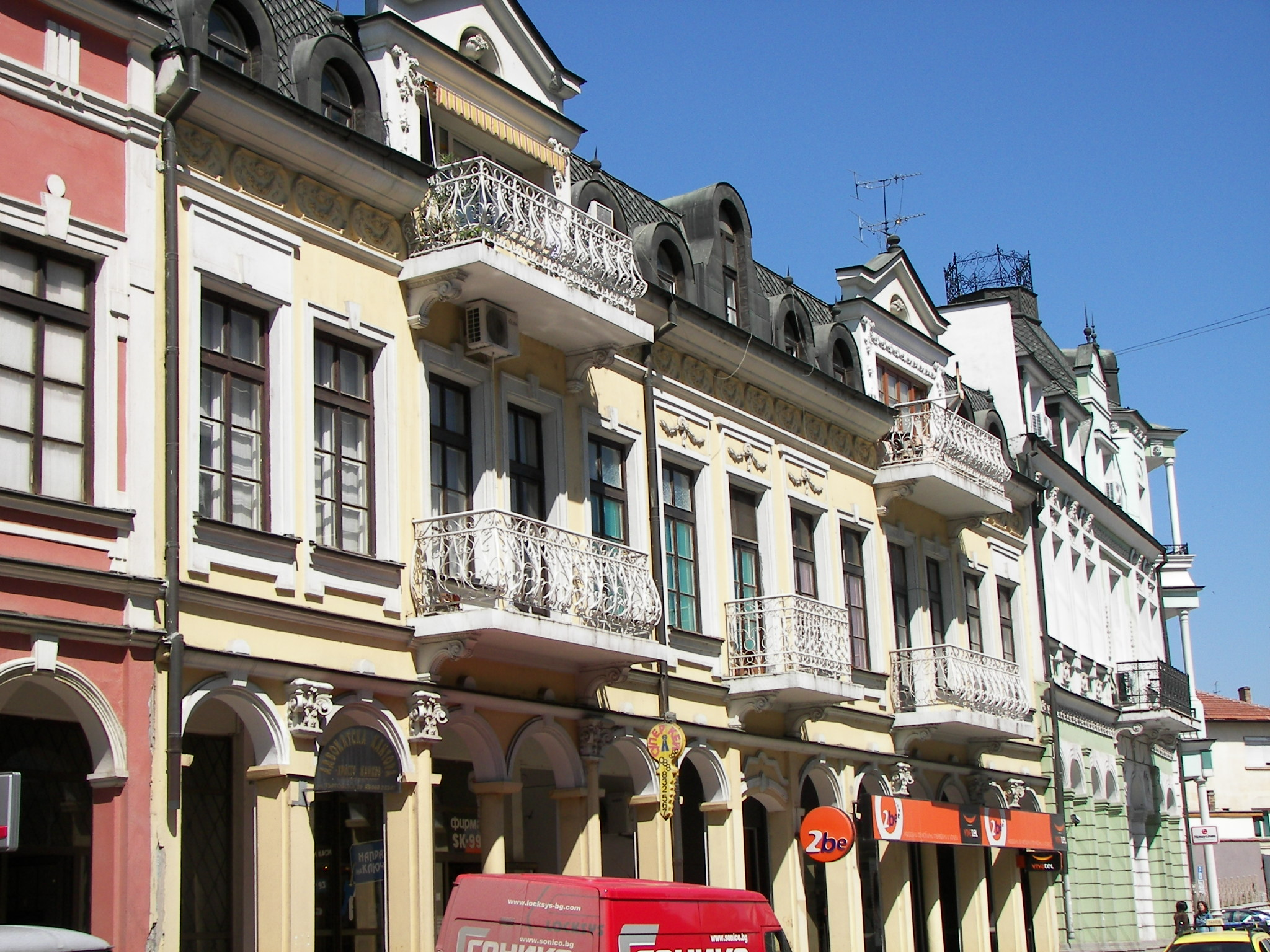

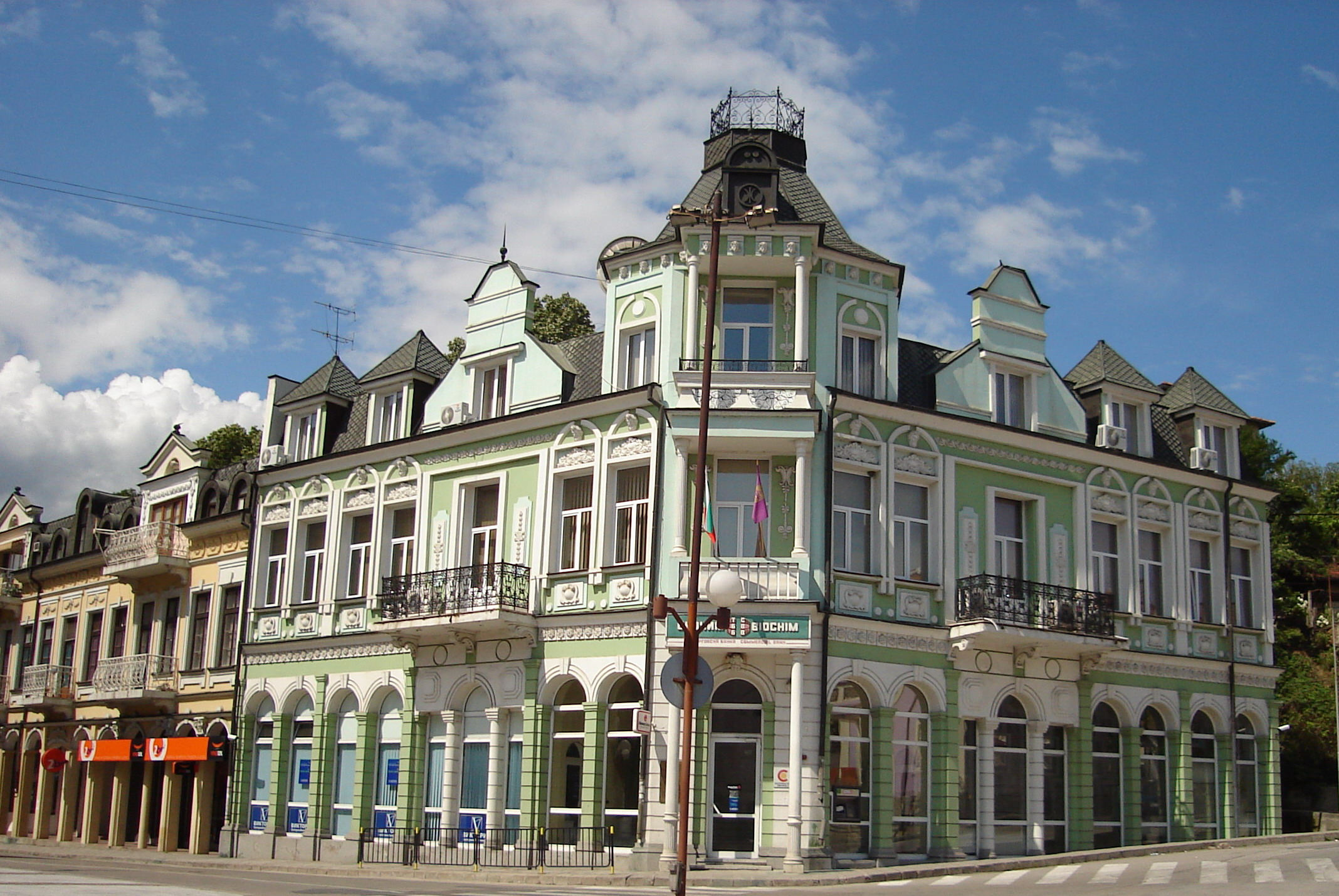
