= Stefan Tsankov =

- Born: July 4, 1881; Gorna Oryahovitsa, Bulgaria
- Died: March 20, 1965 (aged 83)

Stefan Stanchev Tsankov (Bulgarian: Стефан Станчев Цанков, 4 July 1881, Gorna Oryahovitsa, Bulgaria — 20 March 1965) was a Bulgarian Orthodox theologian and Archpriest of the Bulgarian Orthodox Church.

== Life and work ==
Tsankov studied the liturgy and spirituality of the Eastern Orthodox Church in an Orthodox seminary and was ordained a presbyter. Later he also received the rank of protopresbyter or archpriest.

Tsankov published theological books and took part in lectures at home and abroad. He describes Orthodox Christian worship the following way:

In the liturgy of the Orthodox Church ... are doctrine and experience, symbol and reality, history and present, God and man united .

Through the results of his theological research, he was given a professorship at Sofia University in Bulgaria. He was a member of the Christian Peace Conference and worked in Prague at his First and Second Meetings in 1958 and 1959.

On the occasion of the 120th anniversary of the University of Sofia and the 85th anniversary of its Theological Faculty, an international conference in memory of Stefan Tsankov was held.

== German language works ==
- The Constitution of the Bulgarian Orthodox Church, (1918)
- The Orthodox Christianity of the East (1928)
- The administration of the Bulgarian Orthodox Church (1920)
- The fundamental difficulties of holding an Ecumenical Council, (Communication) - in: H. S. Alivisatos (ed.) Conces-verbaux du premier Congres de Theologie Orthodoxe an Athenes, 29 Novembre - 6 Decembre 1936, p. 269-282;

== Literature ==
- The Encyclopedia of Christianity, Volume 1 (A-D) by Erwin Fahlbusch. See all pages with references to "ecclesiological problems". Excerpt - on Stefan Zankow (1881-1965) made important contributions to basic ecclesiological problems, to the Orthodox conception of the -4 unity of the church. Page 309: "... and regional ecumenical conference from the early part of the 20th century, To the role of nontheological factors, and to the ... "
