= Vrelo, Bulgaria =

Vrelo Врело
- Village
- Location within Bulgaria
- Coordinates: 41.5333°N 25.5000°E
- Country: Bulgaria
- Province: Kardzhali Province
- Municipality: Momchilgrad
- Elevation: 550 m (1,800 ft)
- Time zone: UTC+2 (EET)
  - Summer (DST): UTC+3 (EEST)

Vrelo is a village in Momchilgrad Municipality, Kardzhali Province, southern Bulgaria.
