= Anastas Ishirkov =

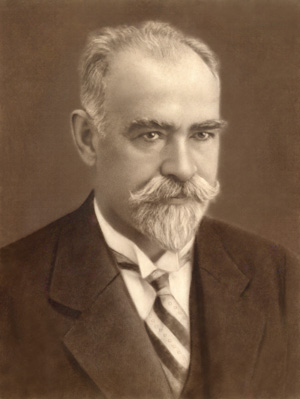
- Born: 5 April 1868; Lovech, Ottoman Empire (now Bulgaria)
- Died: 6 April 1937 (aged 69); Sofia, Bulgaria
- Resting place: Central Sofia Cemetery; 42°42′43.7″N 23°20′06.6″E
- Occupation: Scientist

Academic professor Anastas Todorov Ishirkov (Bulgarian: Анастас Тодоров Иширков; 5 April 1868 – 6 April 1937) was a Bulgarian scientist, geographer and ethnographer. He was the founder of geographical science in Bulgaria and was a member of Bulgarian Academy of Sciences.

== Honours ==
Ishirkov Crag on Oscar II Coast in Graham Land, Antarctica is named after Anastas Ishirkov.
