= Pequod Glacier =

Glacier in Antarctica

Location of Oscar II Coast on Antarctic Peninsula.

Pequod Glacier (65°30′S 62°3′W) is a glacier over 15 nautical miles (28 km) long, draining eastwards between Parlichev Ridge to the north, and Taridin Ridge and Krupen Ridge to the south, and flowing into Exasperation Inlet on the east coast of Graham Land. It lies parallel and just south of Melville Glacier. The lower part of the glacier was surveyed by Falkland Islands Dependencies Survey (FIDS) in 1947 and the upper reaches were surveyed in 1955. Named by United Kingdom Antarctic Place-Names Committee (UK-APC) after the whaling ship Pequod in Herman Melville's Moby-Dick.
