= Daki Jordanov =

Bulgarian botanist

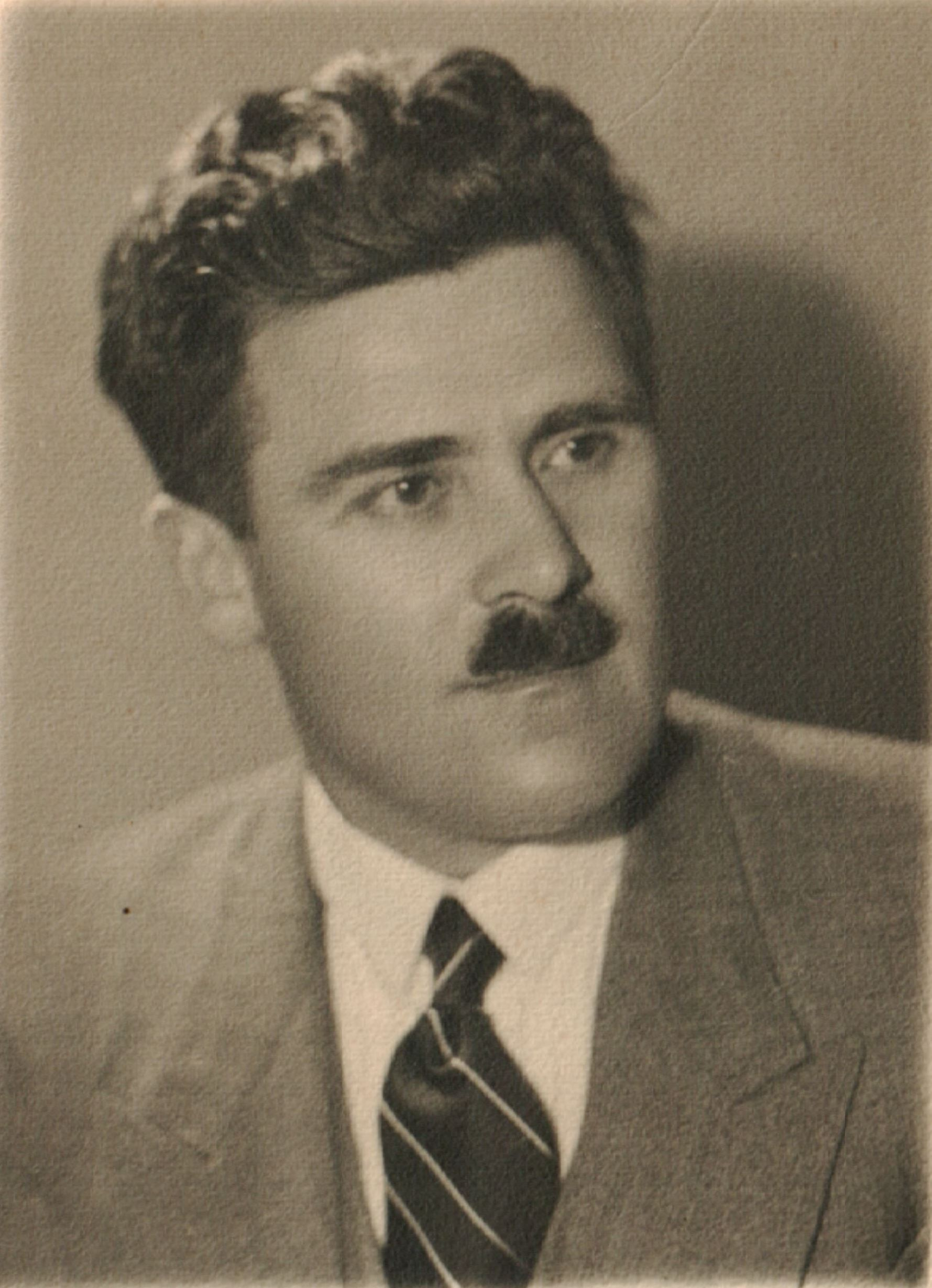
- Born: 13 September 1893; Omurtag; Principality of Bulgaria
- Died: 5 April 1978 (aged 84); Sofia; People's Republic of Bulgaria
- Citizenship: Bulgarian
- Education: Sofia University
- Occupation: Botanist
- Scientific career
- Workplaces: Sofia University; Bulgarian Academy of Sciences

Daki Jordanov Vichev, a.k.a. Daki Jordanov, (13 September 1893 (1 September 1893 ( O.S.)), Omurtag, Targovishte Province, Bulgaria - 5 April 1978, Bulgaria) was a Bulgarian botanist and a member of the Bulgarian Academy of Sciences.

== Biography ==
Daki Yordanov was born on 13 September 1893 (1 September 1893 ( O.S.)) in Osman Pazar (now Omurtag). He completed his primary education in his hometown. Then he graduated from the Agricultural School in Shumen. In 1914, he graduated from high school in Shumen.

He enrolled to study natural history at Sofia University, but interrupted his studies during the First World War. In 1921, he graduated with a thesis on "Flora in the Omurtag region". Since 1922, he worked as an assistant at the Faculty of Biology at the Sofia University. In 1923, he became a founding member of the Bulgarian Botanical Society. He defended his doctoral dissertation on the topic "On the Steppe Vegetation in Bulgaria". In 1939, he was elected an associate professor, from 1945 he was a professor, and in 1947 he was elected an academician of the Bulgarian Academy of Sciences.

During 1956–1962, he was rector of Sofia University "St. Kliment Ohridski". From 1962 to 1973, he was the director of the Institute of Botany at the BAS.

Academician Daki Yordanov died on April 5, 1978, in Sofia.

== Scientific contribution ==
In 1955, he created the Botanical Garden in Balchik. He was the author of over 80 scientific works - monographs, studies, reports. Supervised the publication of the multi-volume "Flora of the Republic of Bulgaria".

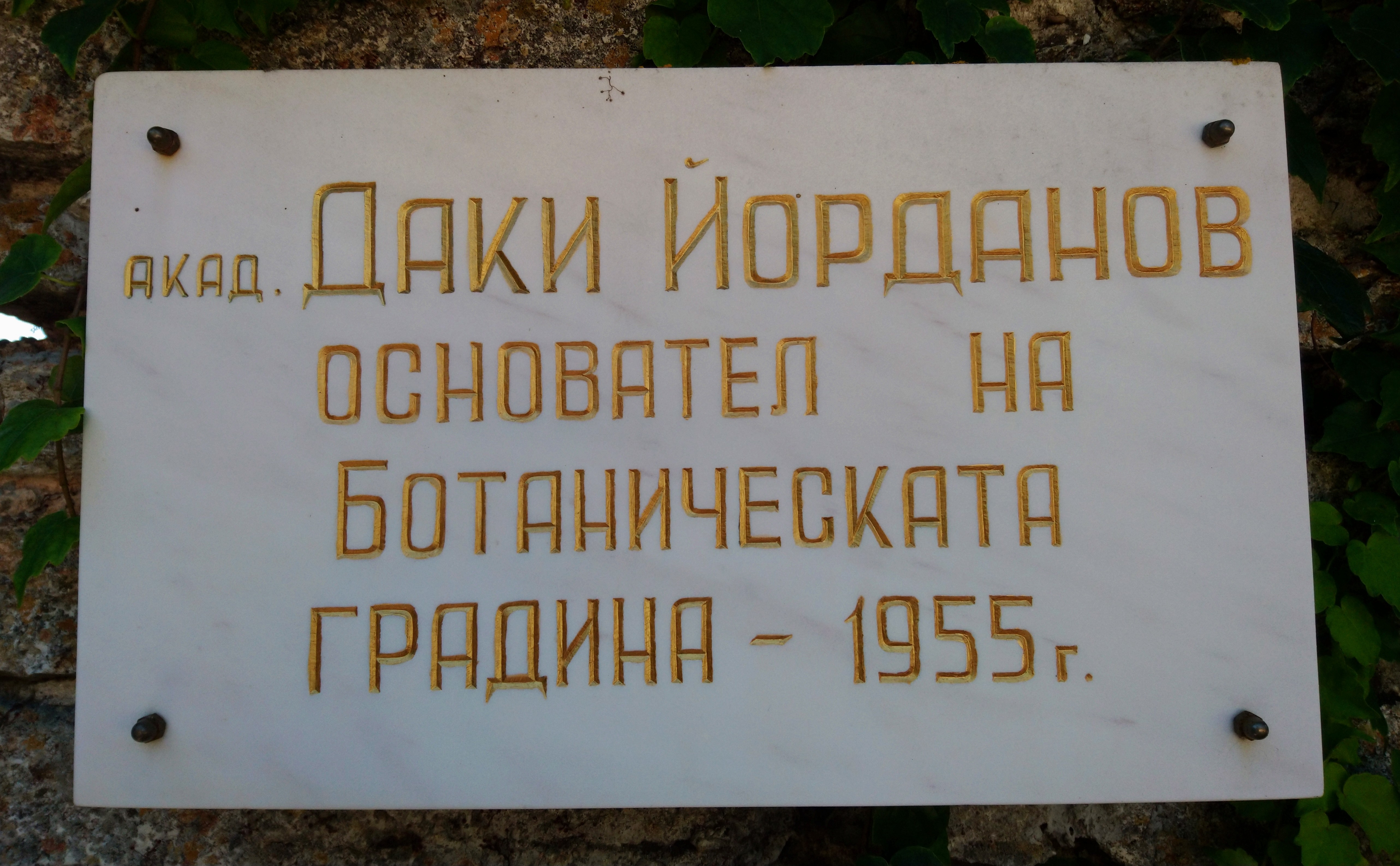
Daki Yordanov memorial plaque

He is the discoverer of 11 new plant genera for Bulgaria. Discovers over 180 taxa new to Bulgaria and the Balkan Peninsula.

Starting with 1965 he was one of the co-editors of the well-known exsiccata Plantae Bulgaricae exsiccatae.

== Commemoration ==
The species Myosotis jordanovii, Verbascum jordanovii, Anthemis jordanovii, Poa jordanovii, Vicia jordanovii, Brassica jordanovii were named in his honor.

The street on which the botanical garden in Balchik is located is named after him.
