= Ivan Ilchev =

- Иван Илчев
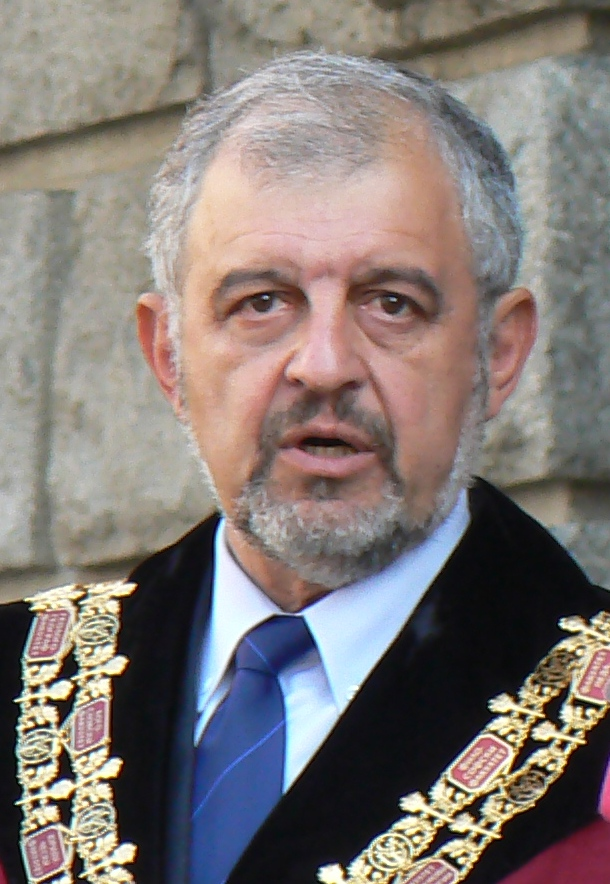

55th Rector of Sofia University
- In office 14 November 2007 – 17 November 2015
- Preceded by: Boyan Biolchev
- Succeeded by: Anastas Gerdzhikov

Personal details
- Born: 25 June 1953 (age 73) Sofia, Bulgaria
- Education: Sofia University

Ivan Ilchev (Bulgarian: Иван Илчев), Ph.D. in history, the rector of Sofia University (the oldest and biggest higher education facility in Bulgaria) between 2007 and 2015. He specialized in modern history of the Balkan peoples.

Ivan Ilchev was born on June 25, 1953, in Sofia. His father is Ilcho Dimitrov, also a famous historian and former minister of education. His mother is of Jewish descent. Ilchev graduated from the 114 English High School in Sofia. He continued his education in Sofia University, where he graduated in history. After his graduation, in 1978, he became assistant professor at the History Department of the Sofia University and associate professor in 1987. He was awarded the title of professor of modern history of the Balkan Peoples in 1995.

Ivan Ilchev has lectured in Ohio State University in Columbus, Wilson Center in Washington, D.C., the University of Chiba, Japan, the universities of Leipzig, Thessaloníki, Oxford, Chicago and many other famous universities.

He was dean of the History Department of Sofia University and member of the Academic Council from 2003 to 2007. Ilchev is also an active member of the Social Council of Bulgarian National Television and the Public Museum Council at the Ministry of Culture.

At the beginning of November 2007, professor Ilchev was elected rector of the Sofia University, after a ballot, by 218 votes to 90 for the other candidate. He was reelected in 2011.

He is corresponding member of the Bulgarian Academy of Sciences.

== Selected publications ==
Ivan Ilchev has published 13 books, 2 of them in co-authorship with other academics. The most renowned of them - in Bulgarian, titles translated - are:

- The Rose of the Balkans. A Short History of Bulgaria. Sofia 2005
- Bulgarian Parliament and Bulgarian Statehood. 125 Years National Assembly 1879-2005 (with V. Kolev, V. Yanchev). Sofia 2005
- Middle Time. Or the Bulgarian between two centuries. Sofia, Colibri 2005
- Touching America (with Plamen Mitev). Sofia 2003
- To the Wester, To the Westest — Japan. Letters of a gaijin. Sofia, Colibri 2001
- My Fatherland — right or not. Exterior propaganda of Balkan peoples. 1821-1923. Sofia 1995
- Advertisement during Bulgarian Renaissance. Sofia 1995
- Bulgaria and the Triple Entente during World War I. Sofia 1990
- Winston Churchill and the Balkans. Sofia 1989, second issue Riva, 2007

== Honours ==
Ilchev Buttress on Graham Land, Antarctica is named after Ivan Ilchev.
