= Georgi Bliznakov =

Georgi Bliznakov (Bulgarian: Георги Близнаков (14 November 1920 – April 2004) was an eminent Bulgarian chemist. He was head of the Department of Inorganic Chemistry and rector at Sofia University, director of the Institute of Inorganic Chemistry of the Bulgarian Academy of Sciences and vice-chairman of the academy.

== Biography ==
Bliznakov was born in 1920 in Berkovitsa, Bulgaria. After graduating in chemistry in 1943 from Sofia University he worked in industry until 1946, when he joined the University of Varna as an assistant in inorganic and physical chemistry. In 1949 he joined the Department of Physical Chemistry at the Polytechnic Institute in Sofia (now the University of Chemical Technology and Metallurgy) as an assistant where he stayed until moving to the Department of Inorganic Chemistry at Sofia University in 1951, becoming full professor and head of department in 1960. He stayed in that post until 1989, serving as university rector from 1981 to 1985.

== Academic interests ==
Bliznakov's main area of research was crystallization. He was the first to introduce adsorption as a thermodynamic factor in crystal growth, and studied catalysis, particular in relation to ammonia oxidation, the preparation of pure substances, radiochemical processes, and the effect of impurities on the linear crystallization rate.

He is the co-author of some of the most popular secondary school chemistry text books in Bulgaria.
