= Delusion Point =

Coordinates: 65°23′S 62°0′W

Location of Oscar II Coast on Antarctic Peninsula.

Delusion Point is a point on the south side of the entrance to Spillane Fjord and the northeast side of the entrance to Sexaginta Prista Bay, which marks the east end of Arkovna Ridge that forms the south wall of Crane Glacier, on the east coast of Graham Land. The feature was photographed from the air by Sir Hubert Wilkins on a flight of December 20, 1928, and was named by the Falkland Islands Dependencies Survey, who charted it in 1947.
