= Sexaginta Prista Bay =

Bay in Antarctica

Location of Oscar II Coast on Antarctic Peninsula.

Sexaginta Prista Bay (Bulgarian: залив Сексагинта Приста, ‘Zaliv Sexaginta Prista’ \'za-liv sek-sa-'gin-ta 'pris-ta\) is the 6.5 km wide bay indenting for 4 km Oscar II Coast in Graham Land southwest of Delusion Point and northeast of Radovene Point. It is part of Exasperation Inlet, formed as a result of the break-up of Larsen Ice Shelf in the area and the retreat of Mapple Glacier in the early 21st century. The feature is named after the ancient Roman town of Sexaginta Prista in Northeastern Bulgaria.

== Location ==
Sexaginta Prista Bay is located at 65°24′05″S 62°06′00″W. SCAR Antarctic Digital Database mapping in 2012.

== Maps ==
- Antarctic Digital Database (ADD). Scale 1:250000 topographic map of Antarctica. Scientific Committee on Antarctic Research (SCAR). Since 1993, regularly upgraded and updated.
