= Anastas Gerdzhikov =

Bulgarian classical philologist

- Анастас Герджиков
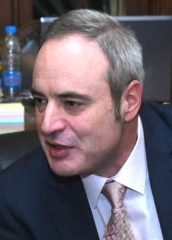
- Gerdzhikov In 2017

56th Rector of Sofia University
- In office 17 November 2015 – 22 November 2023
- Preceded by: Ivan Ilchev
- Succeeded by: Georgi Valchev

Personal details
- Born: 1963 (age 62–63) Kardzhali, People's Republic of Bulgaria
- Education: Humboldt University
- Scientific career
- Fields: Ancient and medieval literature
- Institutions: University of Sofia

Anastas Georgiev Gerdzhikov (Bulgarian: Анастас Георгиев Герджиков; born 1963) is professor of ancient and medieval literature who was the 56th Rector of Sofia University from 2015 to 2023. He unsuccessfully ran for President of Bulgaria in the 2021 election.

== Early life and education ==
Anastas Georgiev Gerdzhikov was born in Kardzhali, People's Republic of Bulgaria, in 1963. He graduated from the NGDEK in 1982. He was at the Department of Classical Philology at Sofia University from 1984 to 1985. He attended Humboldt University of Berlin from 1986 to 1990, and graduated with a master of arts degree after writing a thesis on Aristotle's critique of the political works of Plato. He received a doctorate in 2001, after writing his thesis The Concept of Clementia in the Roman Literature Tradition in the Period of the Republic and the Ideology of the Early Principate.

== Career ==
At Sofia University Gerdzhikov became a part-time professor in 1990, and then a full-time assistant-professor in Latin in 1991. He became an associate professor in ancient literature in 2004. He was elected Rector of Sofia University in 2015, and reelected with 254 out of 318 votes on 20 November 2019.

From 2001 to 2003, Gerdzhikov was the Deputy Minister of Education and Science. The Scientific Research Fund was managed by him from 2007 to 2008. He ran for president in the 2021 election with the support of GERB, but was defeated in the second round by incumbent Rumen Radev.

== Personal life ==
Gerdzhikov is fluent in English, German, French, and Russian.

== Works cited ==
=== News ===
- "Bulgaria president Radev set to seal re-election: Exit polls". Al Jazeera English. 21 November 2021. Archived from the original on 29 June 2025.
- Todorov, Svetoslav (1 October 2021). "Bulgarian Presidential Race Tightens as GERB-Backed Candidate Unveiled". Balkan Insight. Archived from the original on 29 June 2025.

=== Web ===
- "Sofia University "St. Kliment Ohridski" Rector Professor Dr habil Anastas Gerdzhikov was Reelected doe a Second Term of Office". Sofia University. Archived from the original on 29 June 2025.
