= Domlyan Bay =

Bay in Antarctica

Location of Oscar II Coast on Antarctic Peninsula.

Domlyan Bay (Bulgarian: залив Домлян, ‘Zaliv Domlyan’ \'za-liv 'dom-lyan\) is the 4.75 km wide bay indenting for 5.5 km Oscar II Coast in Graham Land south of Radovene Point and north of Kalina Point. It is part of Exasperation Inlet, formed as a result of the break-up of Larsen Ice Shelf in the area, and the retreat of Melville Glacier in the early 21st century. The feature is named after the settlement of Domlyan in Southern Bulgaria.

== Location ==
Domlyan Bay is located at 65°27′10″S 62°09′00″W. SCAR Antarctic Digital Database mapping in 2012.

== Maps ==
- Antarctic Digital Database (ADD). Scale 1:250000 topographic map of Antarctica. Scientific Committee on Antarctic Research (SCAR). Since 1993, regularly upgraded and updated.
