= Mapple Glacier =

Glacier in Antarctica

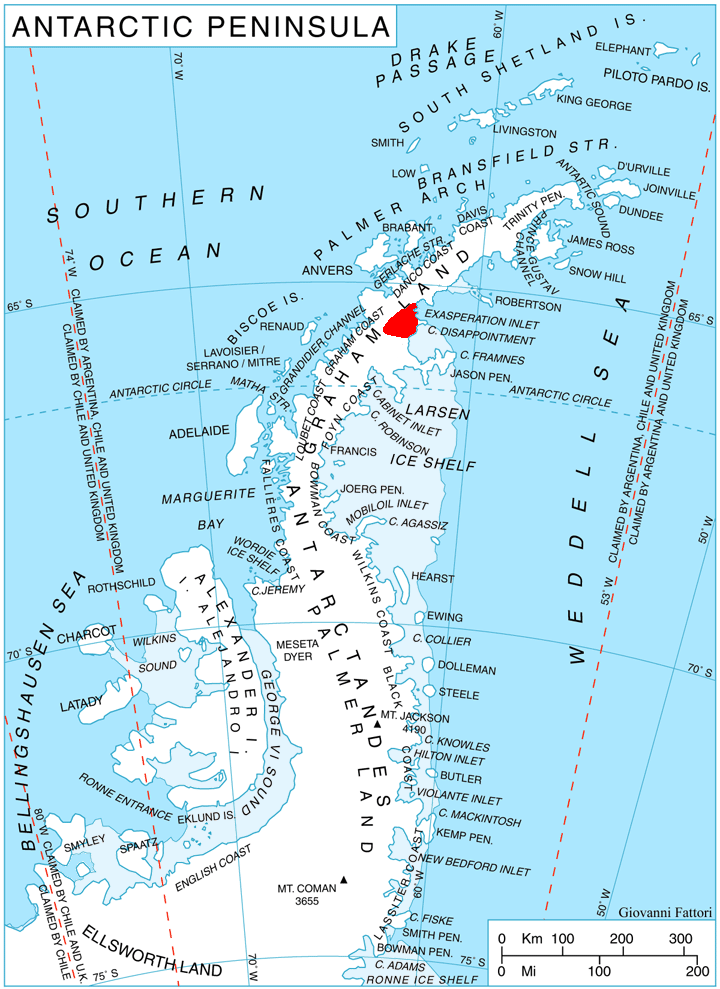
Location of Aristotle Mountains on the Antarctic Peninsula.

Mapple Glacier (65°25′S 62°15′W) is a narrow glacier 15 nautical miles (28 km) long, flowing eastward between Arkovna Ridge and Stevrek Ridge in the Aristotle Mountains of Antarctica to enter Sexaginta Prista Bay on the east side of Graham Land. It lies 2 nautical miles (4 km) north of Melville Glacier and is separated from it by a line of small peaks. The glacier was surveyed by the Falkland Islands Dependencies Survey in 1961, and was named by the UK Antarctic Place-Names Committee after Father Mapple, the whalemen's Nantucket priest in Herman Melville's Moby-Dick.
