= Melville Glacier =

Glacier in Antarctica

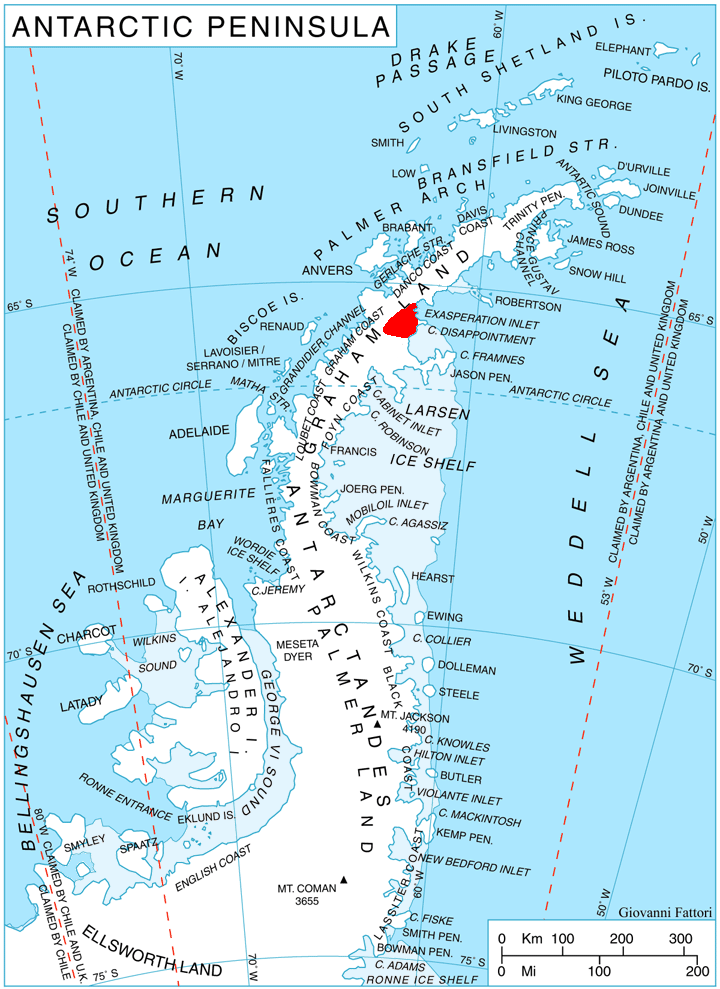
Location of Aristotle Mountains on the Antarctic Peninsula.

Melville Glacier (65°28′S 62°10′W) is a glacier, 12 nautical miles (22 km) long, between Mapple Glacier and Pequod Glacier on the east coast of Graham Land, Antarctica. It flows eastwards between Stevrek Ridge and Parlichev Ridge in the Aristotle Mountains, to enter Domlyan Bay in the Weddell Sea. It was surveyed by the Falkland Islands Dependencies Survey in 1947 and 1955, and was named by the UK Antarctic Place-Names Committee after Herman Melville, the author of the 1851 novel Moby-Dick. Several other features in the area, such as Mount Ahab, are named after characters in the story.
