= List of glaciers of Princess Elizabeth Land =

Following is a list of glaciers of Princess Elizabeth Land in Antarctica. This list may not reflect recently named glaciers in Princess Elizabeth Land.

- Browns Glacier
- Chaos Glacier
- Dålk Glacier
- Hargreaves Glacier
- Hovde Glacier
- Il Polo Glacier
- Kreitzer Glacier
- Polar Record Glacier
- Polar Times Glacier
- Polarårboken Glacier
- Polarforschung Glacier
- Ranvik Glacier
- Rogers Glacier
- Sørsdal Glacier
- Stevenson Glacier
