= Collins Nunatak =

Mountain in the Antarctic

- Location within Antarctica

Highest point
- Coordinates: 69°48′36″S 73°34′37″E

Geography
- Location: Princess Elizabeth Land, East Antarctica

The Collins Nunatak is a small and isolated Nunatak on the Ingrid Christensen Coast of Princess Elizabeth Land in East Antarctica. It rises about halfway between the Landing Bluff and the Statler Hills.

The Norwegian cartographers named and mapped the area in 1946 using aerial photographs from the Lars Christensen Expedition in 1936/37. New mapping was carried out in 1968 during tellurometer measurements as part of the Australian National Antarctic Research Expeditions. The Australian Antarctic Names and Medals Committee named it in 1968 after Neville Joseph Collins, diesel engine mechanic at Mawson Station (1957, 1960) and Wilkes Station, and was involved in the exploration of the Amery Ice Shelf in 1968.
