= Cowell Island =

Antarctic island

- Location within Antarctica

Geography
- Location: Antarctica
- Coordinates: 69°16′S 76°43′E

Administration
- Administered under the Antarctic Treaty System

Demographics
- Population: Uninhabited

Cowell Island is a small island, partly contained by the Flatnes Ice Tongue, on the Ingrid Christensen Coast of Princess Elizabeth Land, Antarctica. It lies 6 kilometres (3 nmi) west-south-west of Hovde Island and Amanda Bay. It was first mapped from aerial photographs by the Lars Christensen Expedition, 1936–37, and first visited by an Australian National Antarctic Research Expeditions (ANARE) survey party led by M.J. Corry in February 1969. It was named by the Antarctic Names Committee of Australia for W.D. Cowell, a cook at Mawson Station in 1969 and a member of the ANARE Prince Charles Mountains survey party in the same year.

== See also ==
- List of Antarctic and subantarctic islands
