= Vrana Dome =

Vrana Dome (69°53′S 73°28′E) is a prominent, rounded ice dome about 4 nautical miles (7 km) northeast of Statler Hills, at the east side of Amery Ice Shelf A survey station was established on the dome during the ANARE (Australian National Antarctic Research Expeditions) tellurometer traverse from Larsemann Hills to Reinbolt Hills in 1968. Named for A. Vrana, a cosmic ray physicist at Mawson Station in 1968, who assisted in the survey.
