= Ranvik Island =

Island in the Rauer Islands archipelago in Princess Elizabeth Land, Antarctica

- Location within Antarctica
- Etymology: Relation to Ranvik Bay

Geography
- Location: Ranvik Bay, Princess Elizabeth Land
- Coordinates: 68°54′S 77°50′E
- Archipelago: Rauer Islands
- Length: 2.8 km (1.74 mi)

Ranvik Island (68°54′S 77°50′E) is a rocky island, 1.5 nautical miles (2.8 km) long, which is the largest island in the southern part of the Rauer Islands. It lies at the northern end of Ranvik Bay, about 3 nautical miles (5.6 km) northwest of Browns Glacier. Mapped by Norwegian cartographers, as being connected to the mainland, from air photos taken by the Lars Christensen Expedition (1936–37). They gave the name "Ranviktangen" (the Ranvik tongue) because of its association with Ranvik Bay. The Advisory Committee on Antarctic Names (US-ACAN) has approved John H. Roscoe's 1952 recommendation that the Norwegian name be amended to Ranvik Island. Roscoe's examination of this area in air photos taken by U.S. Navy Operation Highjump (1946–47) determined that the feature described is actually separated from the mainland.

== See also ==
- List of antarctic and sub-antarctic islands
