= Amanda Bay =

Antarctic Specially Protected Area

Coordinates: 69°15′S 76°50′E

- Hovde Cove
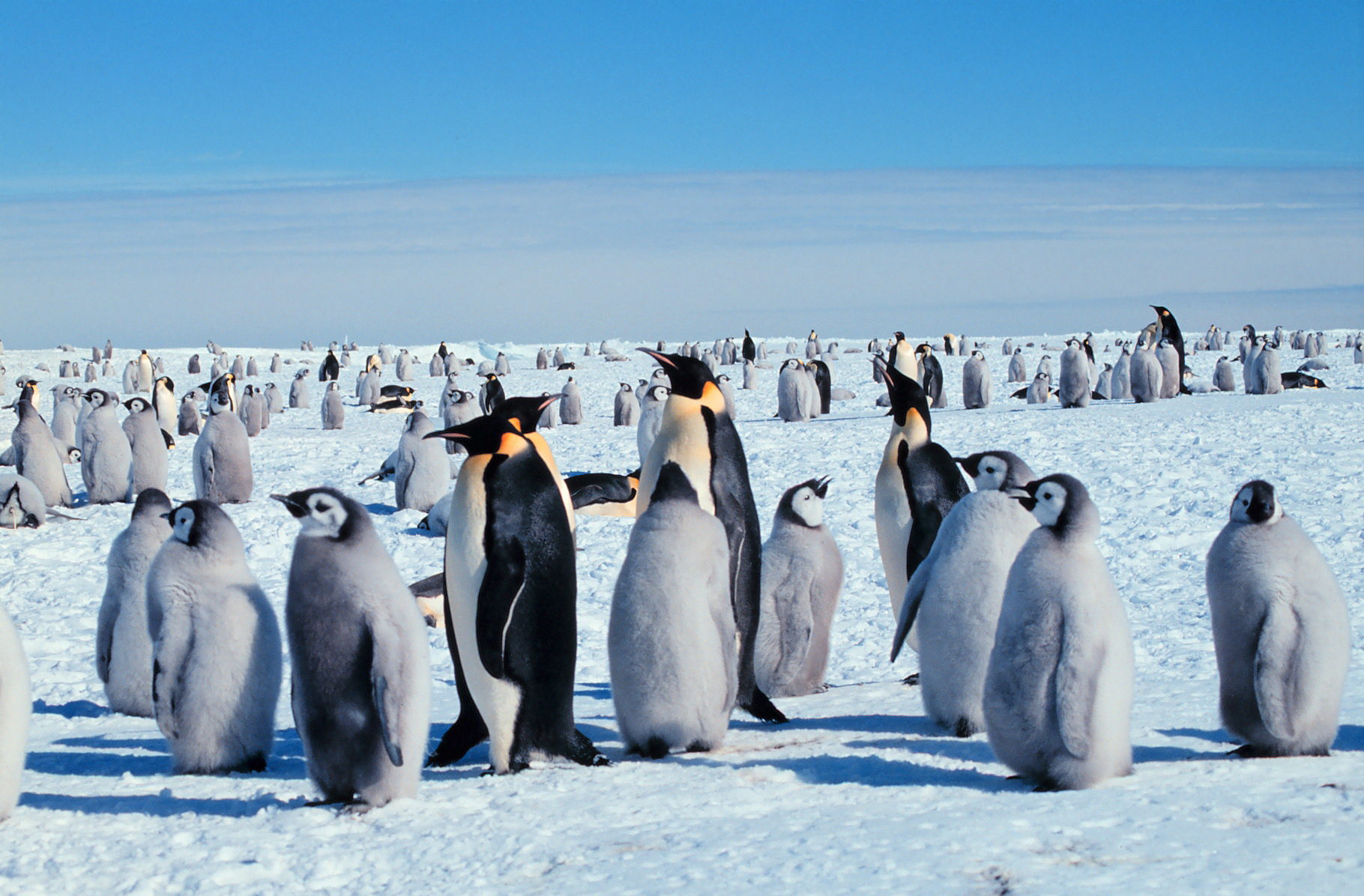
- The bay has a breeding colony of emperor penguins
- Interactive map of Amanda Bay
- Location: East Antarctica

Amanda Bay, also sometimes known as Hovde Cove, lies in southern Prydz Bay on the Ingrid Christensen Coast of Princess Elizabeth Land, East Antarctica. It is best known for its breeding colony of several thousand pairs of emperor penguins on sea ice at the south-west corner of the bay.

== Description ==
The bay is positioned south-west of the Brattstrand Bluffs, between the Vestfold Hills about 75 km (47 mi) to the north-east and the Larsemann Hills 22 km (14 mi) to the south-west. It is about 6 km (3.7 mi) long and 3 km (1.9 mi) wide, and opens north-west into the much larger Prydz Bay. The south-west side of the bay is flanked by the Flatnes Ice Tongue with Cowell Island at its western corner. The eastern and southern sides are bounded by the ice cliffs of the Hovde Glacier, with Hovde Island in the north-east. There are small islets within the bay and several unnamed islands a few kilometres offshore. The bay is generally filled with fast ice, even during summer.

== History ==
The coastline in the vicinity of the bay was first seen and named the Ingrid Christensen Coast by Captain Mikkelsen of the Norwegian ship Thorshavn on 20 February 1935. Oblique aerial photographs of the coastline were taken on a Lars Christensen financed expedition in 1937 as well as by the US Navy's Operation Highjump in 1947 for reconnaissance purposes. In the 1954-55 summer, the Australian National Antarctic Research Expedition (ANARE) explored the waters of Prydz Bay on the Kista Dan. The first recorded landing in the area was made on 5 February 1955 on Lichen Island by a sledging party led by Phillip Law. Further aerial photography was undertaken by ANARE from 1957 to 1960, with the first recorded visit to the bay taking place in August 1957 by a surveying party from Davis Station. During the return flight the area was photographed and named Amanda Bay after the newly-born daughter of the pilot, RAAF Squadron Leader Peter Clemence.

== Antarctic Specially Protected Area ==
The site is protected under the Antarctic Treaty System as Antarctic Specially Protected Area (ASPA) No.169, principally because of its emperor penguin colony. It has also been identified as an Important Bird Area by BirdLife International for the same reason.
