= Maris Nunatak =

Maris Nunatak (69°59′S 73°9′E) is a small coastal nunatak in Antarctica, 2 nautical miles (4 km) east-northeast of Whisnant Nunatak at the junction of Rogers Glacier and the east side of the Amery Ice Shelf. It was delineated in 1952 by John H. Roscoe from air photos taken by U.S. Navy Operation Highjump (1946–47), and named by him for R.L. Maris, an air crewman on Operation Highjump photographic flights over this and other coastal areas between 14°E and 164°E longitude.
