= Whisnant Nunatak =

Whisnant Nunatak (69°59′S 73°5′E) is a small coastal nunatak protruding above the terminus of Rogers Glacier between McKaskle Hills and Maris Nunatak, at the east side of Amery Ice Shelf. Delineated in 1952 by John H. Roscoe from U.S. Navy Operation Highjump aerial photographs taken in March 1947. Named by Roscoe for J.R. Whisnant, Operation Highjump air crewman on photographic flights over this and other coastal areas between 14 and 164 East longitude.
