= Hargreaves Glacier =

Glacier in Princess Elizabeth Land, Antarctica

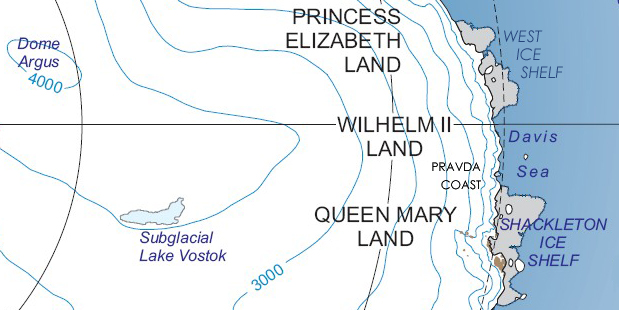
- Location of Princess Elizabeth Land

- Location within Antarctica
- Location: Princess Elizabeth Land
- Coordinates: 69°46′S 74°20′E
- Length: 2 nmi (4 km; 2 mi)
- Thickness: unknown
- Terminus: Ingrid Christensen Coast
- Status: unknown

Hargreaves Glacier (69°46′S 74°20′E) is a glacier 2 nautical miles (4 km) west of Mount Caroline Mikkelsen on the Ingrid Christensen Coast of Antarctica. It drains into the central part of the head of Sandefjord Ice Bay. The glacier was delineated in 1952 by John H. Roscoe from aerial photographs taken by U.S. Navy Operation Highjump, 1946–47, and was named by him for R.B. Hargreaves, an aerial photographer on Operation Highjump flights in the area.

== See also ==
- List of glaciers in the Antarctic
- Glaciology
