= Nanok Deep =

Coordinates: 68.66669°S 71.00000°E

The Nanok Deep is a narrow and 500 m below sea level of the cooperation lake off the Lars Christensen Coast of the East Arctic Mac Robertson Land. It is located in the Prydz Bay and extends under the Amery Ice Shelf.

The Antarctic Names Committee of Australia named it after the Danish ship Nanok S., which was used from 1979 to 1984 as part of the Australian National Antarctic Research Expeditions.
