= Sansom Islands =

Coordinates: 69°42′32″S 73°44′50″E

The Sansom Islands are two low rock islands in Sandefjord Bay, about 24 kilometres (15 mi) WNW of Mount Caroline Mikkelsen. Mapped by Norwegian cartographers from air photographs taken by the Lars Christensen Expedition (1936–37) and called Knattskjera (The Crag Skerry). The Islands were visited by members of the ANARE Prince Charles Mountains Survey party in January – February 1969 and geological investigations made. They are named after J. R. Sansom, a medical officer with the ANARE Amery Ice Shelf party (1968).
