= Chaos Glacier =

Glacier in Antarctica

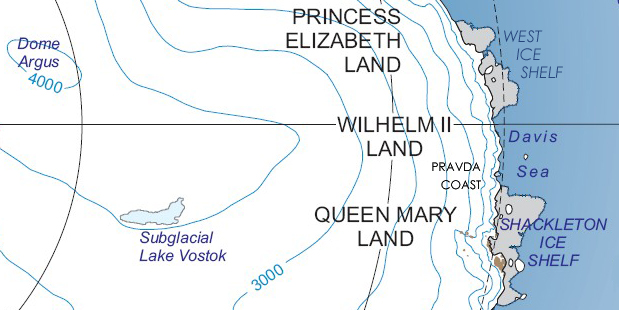
- Location of Princess Elizabeth Land

- Location within Antarctica
- Location: Princess Elizabeth Land
- Coordinates: 69°1′S 78°00′E
- Length: 4 nmi (7 km; 5 mi)
- Thickness: unknown
- Terminus: Ranvik Bay
- Status: unknown

Chaos Glacier (69°1′S 78°0′E) is a glacier 4 nautical miles (7 km) south of Browns Glacier, flowing westward from Ingrid Christensen Coast into the central part of Ranvik Bay. It was mapped by Norwegian cartographers from air photos taken by the Lars Christensen Expedition (1936–37), and named by John H. Roscoe in a 1952 study of U.S. Navy Operation Highjump aerial photography of this coast. The name alludes to the jumbled, chaotic, appearance of the terminal glacial flowage.

== See also ==
- List of glaciers in the Antarctic
- Glaciology
