= Blake Nunataks =

Blake Nunataks (74°10′S 66°40′E) is a group of three low, flat-topped nunataks running in a line northeast–southwest between Wilson Bluff and Mount Maguire, near the head of Lambert Glacier. They were sighted by Flying Officer J. Seaton, RAAF, during a photographic flight in November 1956, and named by the Antarctic Names Committee of Australia for J.R. Blake, auroral physicist at Mawson Station in 1958.
