= Flatnes Ice Tongue =

Ice tongue in Antarctica

Coordinates: 69°16′S 76°44′E

The Flatnes Ice Tongue is an ice tongue forming the western limit of Amanda Bay in the south-east part of Prydz Bay, Ingrid Christensen Coast, Princess Elizabeth Land, Antarctica. The tongue is nourished by local drainage and extends for 6 kilometres (4 mi) into the bay. It was plotted by Norwegian cartographers from aerial photographs taken by the Lars Christensen Expedition of 1936–37 and named Flatnes ("flat point"). The generic term "ice tongue" has been approved for this feature on the basis of John H. Roscoe's 1952 study of features in the area as identified in air photos taken by the US Navy's Operation Highjump (1946–47).
