= Polar Record Glacier =

Glacier in Antarctica

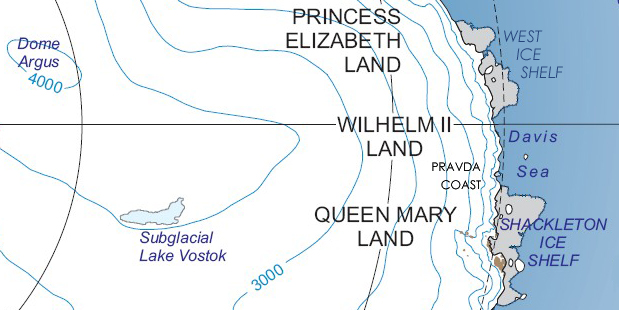
- Location of Princess Elizabeth Land

- Location within Antarctica
- Location: Princess Elizabeth Land
- Coordinates: 69°45′S 75°30′E
- Thickness: unknown
- Terminus: Publications Ice Shelf
- Status: unknown

Polar Record Glacier (69°45′S 75°30′E) is a large glacier flowing between Meknattane Nunataks and Dodd Island to the central part of Publications Ice Shelf. Delineated in 1952 by John H. Roscoe from aerial photographs taken by U.S. Navy Operation Highjump, 1946–47. Named by Roscoe after Research Institute, Cambridge, England.

== See also ==
- List of glaciers in the Antarctic
- Glaciology
