= Il Polo Glacier =

Glacier in Antarctica

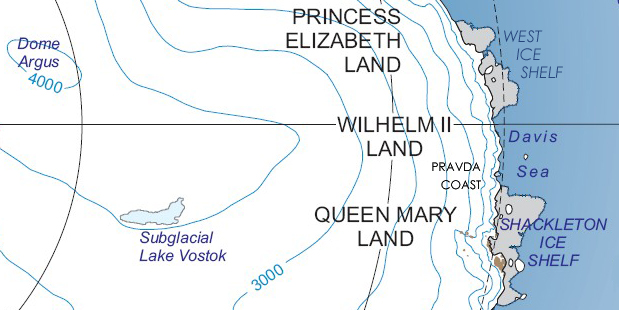
- Location of Princess Elizabeth Land

- Location within Antarctica
- Location: Princess Elizabeth Land
- Coordinates: 69°50′S 74°54′E
- Thickness: unknown
- Terminus: Publications Ice Shelf
- Status: unknown

Il Polo Glacier (69°50′S 74°54′E) is a small glacier draining northward between Polar Times Glacier and Polarforschung Glacier into the Publications Ice Shelf, Antarctica. It was delineated in 1952 by John H. Roscoe from air photos taken by the U.S. Navy during Operation Highjump, 1946–47. Roscoe named it after Il Polo, a polar journal published by the Istituto Geografico in Forlì, Italy.

== See also ==
- List of glaciers in the Antarctic
- Glaciology
