= Debutante Island =

Island in Antarctica

- Location within Antarctica

Geography
- Location: Antarctica
- Coordinates: 69°34′S 75°30′E

Administration
- Administered under the Antarctic Treaty System

Demographics
- Population: Uninhabited

Debutante Island is a narrow island located in the southernmost part of the Søstrene Islands. The island is mostly ice-covered except for a small rock outcrop and barely protrudes above the general level of the Publications Ice Shelf. It was mapped by Norwegian cartographers from aerial photographs taken during the Lars Christensen Expedition, 1936–37, and was named "Debutante" in 1952 by John H. Roscoe because the island is just beginning to "come out" from under its ice cover.

== See also ==
- List of antarctic and sub-antarctic islands
