= Blundell Peak =

Rock peak in Princess Elizabeth Land, Antarctica

Blundell Peak (69°24′S 76°6′E) is a rock peak on Stornes Peninsula in Prydz Bay. First mapped by Norwegian cartographers from air photos taken by the Lars Christensen Expedition, 1936–37, it was named by the Antarctic Names Committee of Australia for A.A. Blundell, radio operator at Mawson Station in 1968, who assisted in the Australian National Antarctic Research Expeditions tellurometer traverse from this peak to Reinbolt Hills in 1968.
