= Boyd Nunatak =

Antartican nunatak

Boyd Nunatak (69°50′S 74°44′E) is a small nunatak 8 nautical miles (15 km) southeast of Mount Caroline Mikkelsen, on the south side of Publications Ice Shelf. It was first mapped by Norwegian cartographers from air photos taken by the Lars Christensen Expedition, 1936–37, remapped by the Australian National Antarctic Research Expeditions, and named by the Antarctic Names Committee of Australia for J.S. Boyd, a physicist at Wilkes Station in 1965.
