= Stein Islands =

Rock islands in Princess Elizabeth Land, Antarctica

Stein Islands (69°39′S 75°47′E) is a two rock islands in the east part of Publications Ice Shelf, about 8 nautical miles (15 km) southeast of the Sostrene Islands. Mapped from air photos by the Lars Christensen Expedition (1936) and named Steinane (the stones).

== See also ==
- List of antarctic and sub-antarctic islands
