= Dodd Island =

Small island in southeast part of Publications Ice Shelf

- Location within Antarctica

Geography
- Location: Antarctica
- Coordinates: 69°42′S 75°38′E

Administration
- Administered under the Antarctic Treaty System

Demographics
- Population: Uninhabited

Dodd Island is a small island in the southeast part of the Publications Ice Shelf about 20 kilometres (10 nmi) south of the Sostrene Islands. First mapped by the Lars Christensen Expedition (1936–37) from air photos, it was remapped by the Australian National Antarctic Research Expeditions, and was named by the Antarctic Names Committee of Australia for D.M. Dodd, a weather observer at Davis Station in 1963.

== See also ==
- List of antarctic and sub-antarctic islands
