= Mount Twigg =

Rock outcrop in Antarctica

Mount Twigg (74°17′S 67°50′E) is a large rock outcrop bisected by a north-trending glacier, standing 16 nautical miles (30 km) southeast of Mount Maguire near the head of Lambert Glacier. Mapped from ANARE (Australian National Antarctic Research Expeditions) air photos and surveys, 1956–58. Named by Antarctic Names Committee of Australia (ANCA) for D.R. Twigg, radio supervisor at Mawson Station, 1958.
