= Vestknatten Nunatak =

Mountain ridge in Polarforschung Glacier, Antarctica

Vestknatten Nunatak (69°48′S 75°3′E) is an elongated nunatak in the center of Polarforschung Glacier, about 13 nautical miles (24 km) east-southeast of Mount Caroline Mikkelsen. It was first mapped from air photographs by the Lars Christensen Expedition, 1936–37, and named Vestknatten, meaning "the west crag." It was then visited by I.R. McLeod, a geologist with the Australian National Antarctic Research Expeditions (ANARE) Prince Charles Mountains survey party in January 1969.
