= Ranvik Glacier =

Glacier in Antarctica

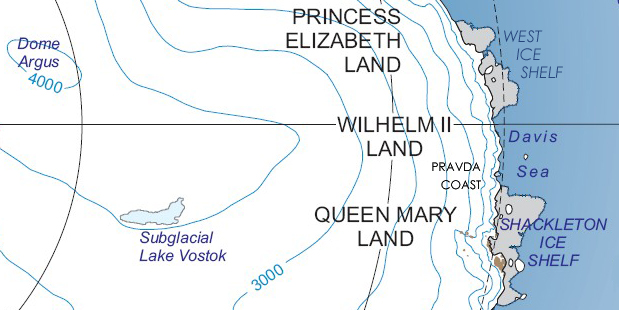
- Location of Princess Elizabeth Land

- Location within Antarctica
- Location: Princess Elizabeth Land
- Coordinates: 69°10′S 77°40′E
- Thickness: unknown
- Terminus: Prydz Bay
- Status: unknown

Ranvik Glacier (69°10′S 77°40′E) is a broad glacier flowing into the southern part of Ranvik Bay in the southeast part of Prydz Bay. Mapped by Norwegian cartographers from air photos taken by the Lars Christensen Expedition (1936–37), and named Ranvikbreen (Ranvik Glacier) for its association with Ranvik Bay.

== See also ==
- List of glaciers in the Antarctic
- Glaciology
