= Abraxas Lake =

Lake on the Ingrid Christensen Coast in East Antarctica

- Location within Antarctica
- Location: Princess Elizabeth Land, East Antarctica
- Coordinates: 68°29′20″S 78°17′13″E
- Max. depth: 19 metres (62 ft)
- Surface elevation: 12.8 metres (42 ft)

Abraxas Lake is a lake with an intense blue color on the Ingrid Christensen Coast in East Antarctica. It is located in the Vestfold Hills. At least three different types of algae occur in this area, which is unusual for these latitudes.

The Antarctic Names Committee of Australia named the area on October 18, 1979. Abraxas alludes to the magic emanating from this lake.

== Literature ==
- John Stewart: Antarctica – An Encyclopedia. Bd. 1, McFarland & Co., Jefferson and London 2011, ISBN 978-0-7864-3590-6, P. 3
