= Sandefjord Ice Bay =

- Location within Antarctica
- Coordinates: 69°40′S 74°25′E
- Type: bay
- Part of: Prydz Bay
- Max. length: 46 kilometres (29 mi)
- Frozen: year-round

Sandefjord Ice Bay is an ice bay about 25 nautical miles (46 km) wide which forms the head of Prydz Bay. The feature is bounded on the west by Amery Ice Shelf, on the east by Publications Ice Shelf, and on the south by the mainland.

The bay was first discovered in February 1935 by Captain Klarius Mikkelsen on the Norwegian whaling ship Thorshavn, sent out by Lars Christensen. They gave it the name Sandefjordbukta after the town of Sandefjord, Norway, center of the Norwegian whaling industry. The term "ice bay" is applied to this feature because of its formation in ice, and to reduce confusion with other bays of this name, particularly Sandefjord Bay on Coronation Island.

== See also ==
- Sansom Islands
- Landing Bluff
