= Mount Borland =

Mountain in Antarctica

Mount Borland (74°25′S 67°45′E) is a large, gently domed mountain, standing 5 nautical miles (9 km) south of Mount Twigg near the head of Lambert Glacier. It was sighted by Flying Officer J. Seaton, RAAF, during an Australian National Antarctic Research Expeditions photographic flight in November 1956, and named by the Antarctic Names Committee of Australia for R.A. Borland, a meteorologist at Mawson Station in 1958.
