= Mount McGuire =

Mount McGuire may refer to:

- Mount McGuire (Alberta), a mountain in Jasper National Park, Canada
- Mount McGuire (Cascade Range), a mountain in British Columbia, Canada
- Mount McGuire (Cassiar Land District), a mountain in British Columbia, Canada
- Mount McGuire (Idaho), a mountain in Idaho, USA
- Mount McGuire (Yukon), a mountain in Yukon, Canada

== See also ==
- Mount Maguire, Antarctica
