= Wilson Bluff =

Wilson Bluff can mean:-

- Wilson Bluff (Antarctica) in Australian territory in Antarctica
- Wilson Bluff, Western and South Australian border on the Great Australian Bight coastline
