= Whisnant =

Whisnant is a surname. Notable people with the surname include:

- Clayton J. Whisnant, American historian
- Gene Whisnant (born 1943), American politician
- Luke Whisnant (born 1957), American writer and poet
- Rebecca Whisnant, American feminist, writer and academic

== See also ==
- Whisnant Nunatak, a nunatak of Princess Elizabeth Land, Antarctica
