= Sandefjord Bay =

Sandefjord Bay can refer to:

- Sandefjord Bay (Coronation Island), on the west side of Coronation Island
- Sandefjord Cove, on Peter I Island
- Sandefjord Ice Bay, on Princess Elizabeth Land, Antarctica
