= Landing Bluff =

Coordinates: 69°44′41″S 73°42′35″E

Landing Bluff is a rock mass in Antarctica with a steep slope on the eastern side, with several small outcrops just to the south-west. It is located on the south-west part of Sandefjord Bay adjacent to Amery Ice Shelf, about 26 km west of Mount Caroline Mikkelsen. Mapped by Norwegian cartographers from air photographs taken by the Lars Christensen Expedition (1936–37) and called Strandknatten (The Strand Crag). A survey cairn was erected on the highest point by ANARE in 1968. So named because of its proximity to the landing place for stores and equipment for the ANARE Amery Ice Shelf party in January–March, 1968.

In 1987 on Landing Bluff was established Soviet Antarctic base Druzhnaya-4.
