= Erebus Glacier =

Glacier in Antarctica

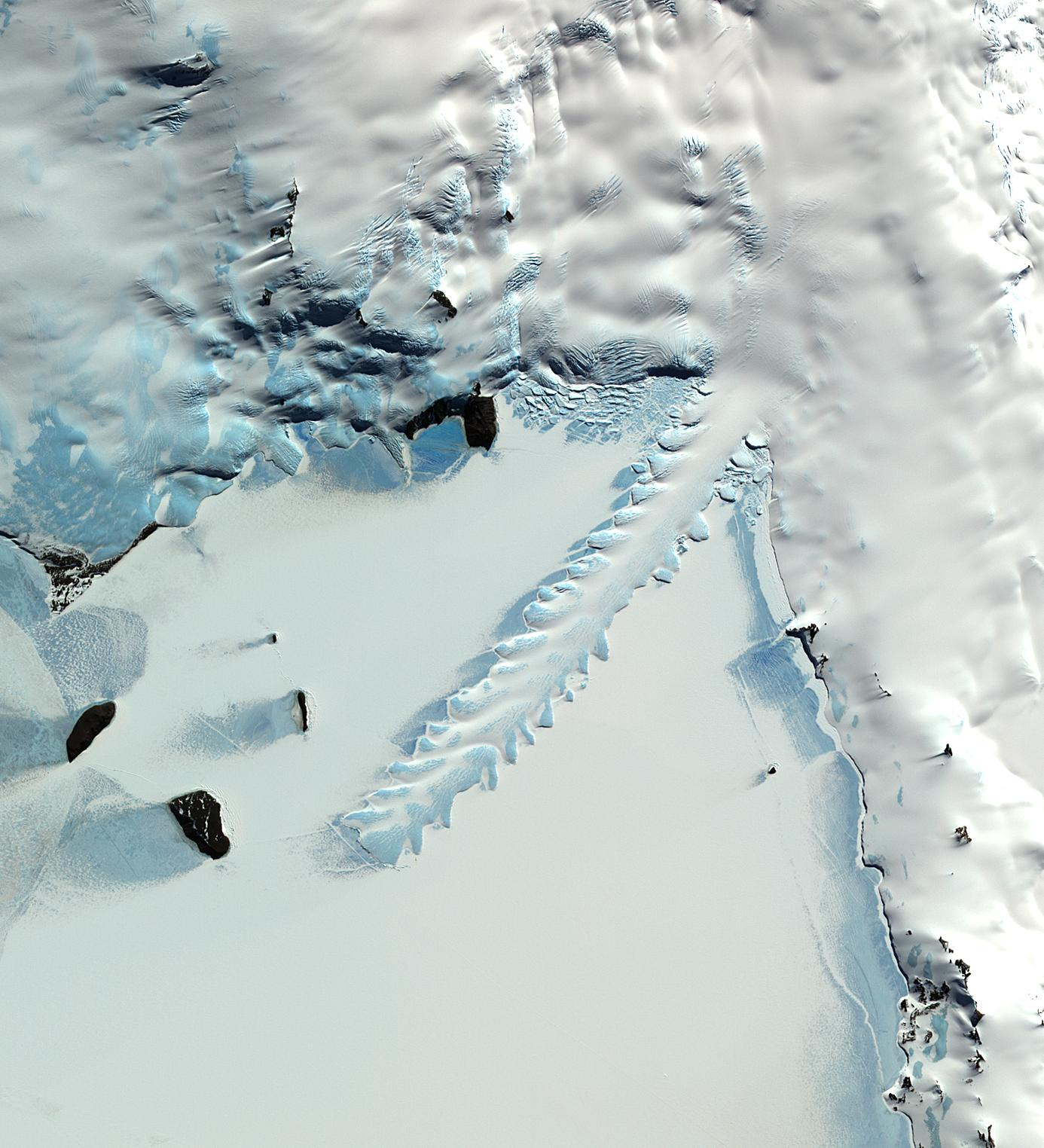
- Erebus Glacier (upper right) and Erebus Ice Tongue (center)

- Location within Antarctica
- Location: Ross Dependency
- Coordinates: 77°40′S 167°6′E
- Thickness: unknown
- Terminus: Erebus Bay
- Status: unknown

Erebus Glacier (77°40′S 167°6′E) is a glacier draining the lower southern slopes of Mount Erebus, Ross Island, Antarctica. It flows west to Erebus Bay where it forms the floating Erebus Glacier Tongue. It was named in association with Mount Erebus by the British National Antarctic Expedition, 1901–04, under Robert Falcon Scott.

A large calving event took place on 1 March 1990, when a substantial portion of the Erebus glacier tongue was detached from the main glacier. The piece that was separated was 3.5 km long and its mass was estimated to be 10^{11} kg.

== See also ==
- List of glaciers in the Antarctic
- Glaciology
