= Hovde Glacier =

Glacier in Princess Elizabeth Land, Antarctica

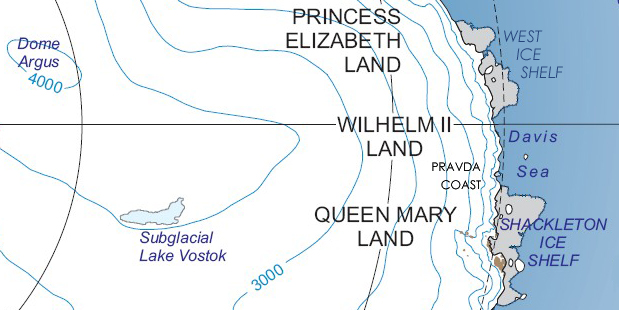
- Location of Princess Elizabeth Land

- Location within Antarctica
- Location: Princess Elizabeth Land
- Coordinates: 69°15′S 76°55′E
- Thickness: unknown
- Terminus: Prydz Bay
- Status: unknown

Hovde Glacier (69°15′S 76°55′E) is a small glacier just west of the Brattstrand Bluffs, and east of Amanda Bay, on the south-eastern shore of Prydz Bay, Antarctica. A short tongue from this glacier extends seaward to nearby Hovde Island. The glacier was first mapped by the Lars Christensen Expedition, 1936–37, which named the island. It was named "Hovde Ice Tongue" by John H. Roscoe in 1952 following his study of aerial photographs of the area taken by U.S. Navy Operation Highjump, 1946–47, but the term glacier is considered appropriate to this small feature.

== See also ==
- List of glaciers in the Antarctic
- Glaciology
