= Polarårboken Glacier =

Glacier in Antarctica

Polarårboken Glacier Glacier
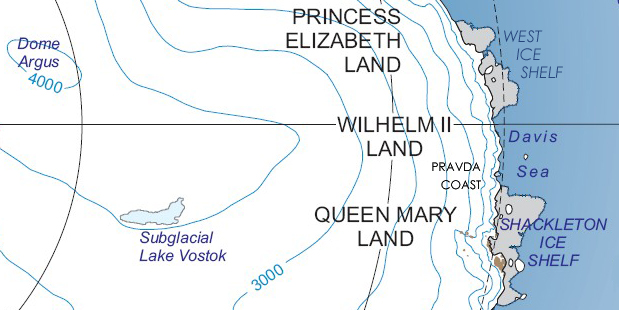
- Location of Princess Elizabeth Land

- Location within Antarctica
- Location: Princess Elizabeth Land
- Coordinates: 69°36′S 76°00′E
- Length: 3 nmi (6 km; 3 mi)
- Thickness: unknown
- Terminus: Publications Ice Shelf
- Status: unknown

Polarårboken Glacier (69°36′S 76°0′E) is a glacier, 3 nautical miles (5.6 km) northeast of Stein Islands, draining westward into the north part of Publications Ice Shelf. Delineated in 1952 by John H. Roscoe from air photos taken by U.S. Navy Operation Highjump (1946–47). Named by Roscoe after Polarårboken, a polar journal published by the Norsk Polarklubb, Oslo, Norway.

== See also ==
- List of glaciers in the Antarctic
- Glaciology
