= Polar Times Glacier =

Glacier in Antarctica

Polar Times Glacier Glacier
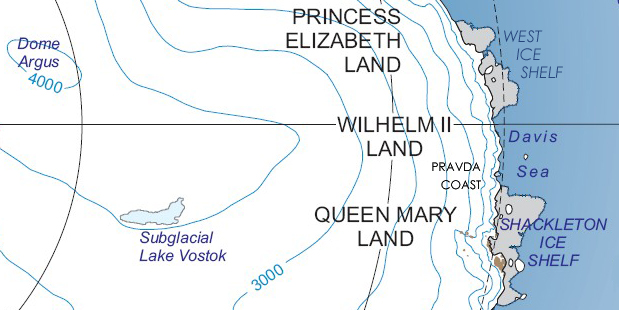
- Location of Princess Elizabeth Land

- Location within Antarctica
- Location: Princess Elizabeth Land
- Coordinates: 69°46′S 74°35′E
- Thickness: unknown
- Terminus: Publications Ice Shelf
- Status: unknown

Polar Times Glacier (69°46′S 74°35′E) is a glacier on Ingrid Christensen Coast, flowing northward between Svarthausen Nunatak and Boyd Nunatak into the western part of Publications Ice Shelf. It was delineated by John H. Roscoe from aerial photographs taken by USN Operation Highjump, 1946–1947, and named by Roscoe after The Polar Times, a polar journal published by the American Polar Society, New York City.

== See also ==
- List of glaciers in the Antarctic
- Glaciology
