= Erebus Glacier Tongue =

Glacier tongue in Antarctica

Coordinates: 77.7341°S 166.528°E

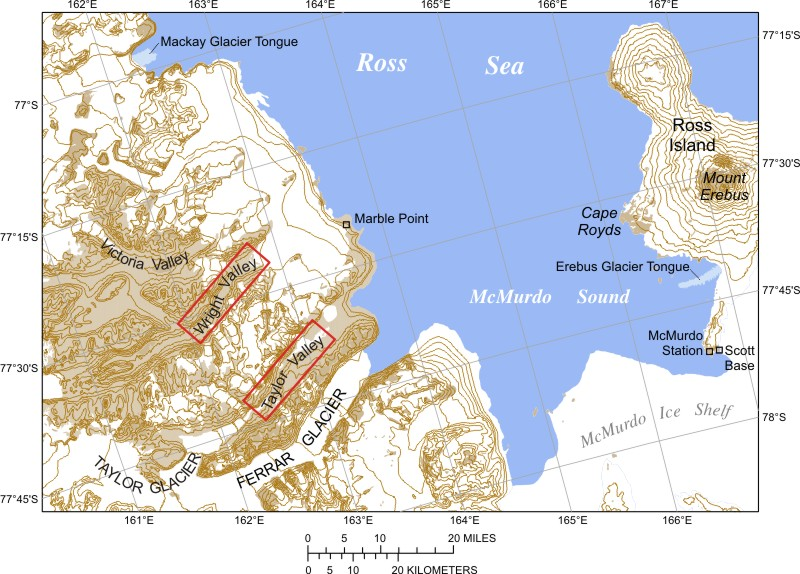
The Erebus Glacier Tongue extends into McMurdo Sound from Ross Island between Cape Royds and McMurdo Station.

The Erebus Glacier Tongue is a mountain outlet glacier and the seaward extension of Erebus Glacier from Ross Island. It projects 11 kilometres (6.8 mi) into McMurdo Sound from the Ross Island coastline near Cape Evans, Antarctica. The glacier tongue varies in thickness from 50 metres (160 ft) at the snout to 300 metres (980 ft) at the point where it is grounded on the shoreline. Explorers from Robert F. Scott's Discovery Expedition (1901–1904) named and charted the glacier tongue.

Erebus Glacier Tongue is about 10 metres (33 ft) high and is centred upon 77.6 degrees south latitude, 166.75 degrees east longitude. The portion of the glacier tongue extending beyond the shoreline or grounding line floats upon the water.

Ice tongues emerge when a glacier ice stream flows rapidly (relative to surrounding ice) into the sea or a lake, usually in a protected area. For instance, Capes Evans and Royds extending from Ross Island protect the Erebus Glacier Tongue from the open waters of the Ross Sea. Hut Point Peninsula to the south helps deflect icebergs propelled by prevailing southerly winds.

The long, narrow Erebus ice stream drains from the western slope of Mount Erebus, an active volcano rising 3,794 metres (12,448 ft) in elevation. The mountain constantly replenishes the glacial ice stream, as annual snow fall exceeds annual snow melt. The Erebus Glacier Tongue is a dynamic structure subject to a host of internal and external stresses which affect its shape, size, and durability.

== Harbors ==
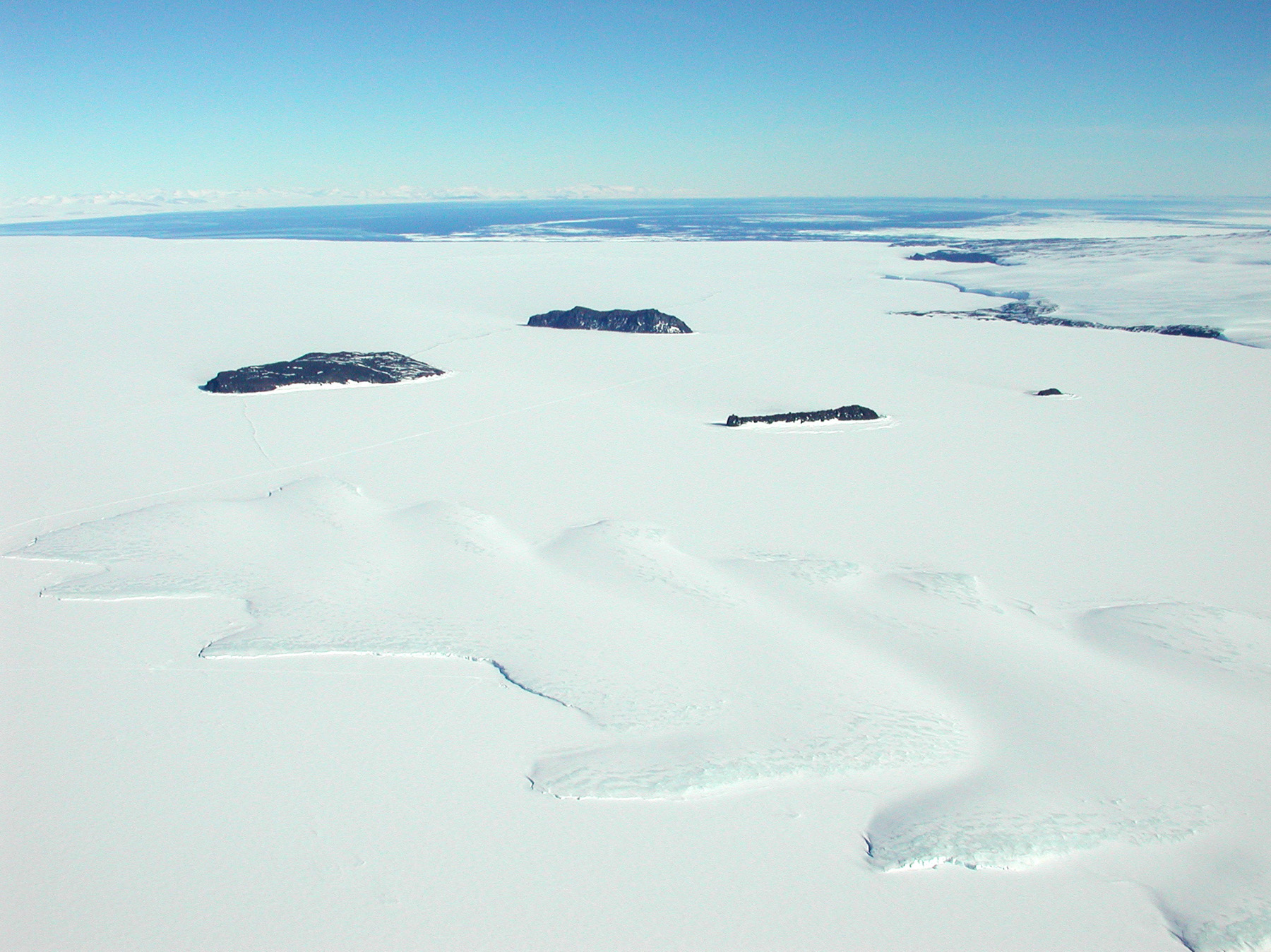
The Erebus Glacier Tongue is shaped by a variety of forces such as wave action during summer thaw, tides, and internal tensions.

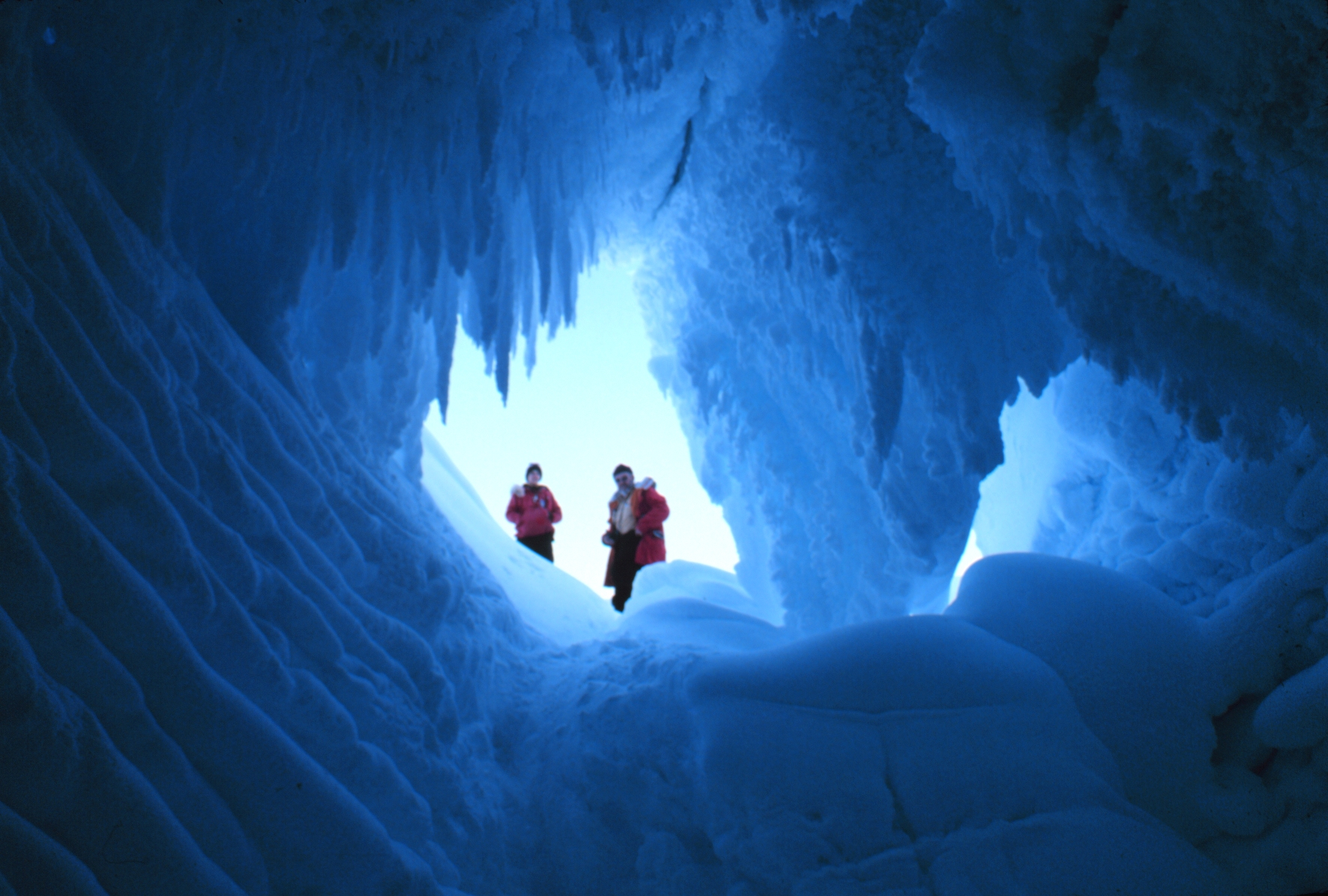
Crevasses covered with snow and ice are exposed as ice caves on the seaward edges of the Erebus Glacier Tongue.

The frozen sea ice of Erebus Bay surrounding the Erebus Glacier Tongue typically breaks out during the summer. This exposes the glacier tongue to pounding waves from McMurdo Sound.

Moreover, such wave action also impacts the ice caves accessed along the leading edges of the glacier tongue. The ice caves include inter-locked crevasses covered by snow bridges. The ice caves are a popular attraction for residents from nearby the McMurdo Station and Scott Base research stations. Visitors report observing stalactite-like icicles on the cave ceilings, as well as intricate ice crystals. Sunlight filtering through ice into the caves bathes the interiors with diffuse blue light.

Contemporary cave explorers who squeezed through a narrow tunnel several hundred feet long to emerge into a large cavern describe their Erebus Glacier Tongue experience as:

Sitting quietly we absorb the natural beauty. Suddenly, we hear the low grinding noise of the glacier moving and the three of us instinctively look at the narrow opening. Without saying a word we realize that it wouldn’t take much for the entrance to collapse and become sealed and trap us here. One by one we slowly exit. Steve later finds a cave that will safely hold all 10 of us. With childlike enthusiasm we explore the glacial cathedral with walls of deep blue ice. Breaking off pieces of ice, 10 or 20,000 years old, we melt it in our mouths and savour the taste of pure, uncontaminated water.

Scientists funded by a National Science Foundation grant have retrieved rare underwater views of the Erebus Glacier Tongue caves by mounting cameras on Weddell seals. Images revealed rocks and dead fish frozen into the ice. Video also depicted other Weddell seals that appeared to use the underwater caves as hiding places from predators such as the orca (or killer whale) and the leopard seal.

Weddell seals are commonly sighted by visitors to the Erebus Glacier Tongue. Each year 300 to 400 Weddell seal pups are born to a colony of seals that live in adjoining Erebus Bay. The seals have been distinctively marked and re-sighted since 1969. The nearly 40-year study represents one of the longest field investigations of its type, according to a Montana State University report.

Emperor and Adelie penguins are also found in the vicinity of the Erebus Glacier Tongue. Adelie are particularly noted for their rookeries on Erebus Bay's rocky north shore at nearby Cape Royds. Penguins, like the Weddell seal, are preyed upon by orcas and leopard seals. The presence of penguins also attracts the predatory skua seabird.

Scarce mention of the glacier tongue's surface, which is more than a mile wide, is made in popular literature. A notable exception is in Ernest Shackleton's book, South! The leader of a December 1916 search party seeking fellow explorers missing in vicinity of the glacier tongue made the following report to Shackleton:

On January 2 thick weather caused party to lay up. On 3rd, glacier was further examined, and several slopes formed by snow led to top of glacier, but crevasses between slope and the tongue prevented crossing. The party then proceeded round the Tongue to Tent Island, which was also searched, a complete tour of the island being made.

== Dynamics ==
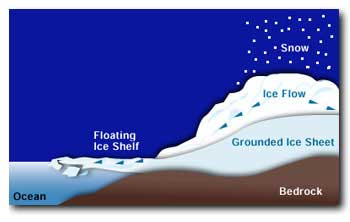
Gravity, slope, and friction are among the factors that affect the flow ice streams such as the Erebus Glacier Tongue. Scientists as early as 2003 identified a correlation between lunar tides and ice stream movement.

The dynamics within floating ice streams such as the Erebus Glacier Tongue are complex. For instance, typically ice streams such as the Erebus Glacier Tongue, which ranges from 50 to 300 meters thick, contain smaller streams of ice. Each ice flow produces its own set of stress fields. Thus, throughout the glacier tongue, different flow rates and tensions are present.

Stress and friction increase along the flanks of ice streams such as the Erebus Glacier Tongue. Stress appears as crevasses as the ice flow rate is slowed. Friction created by the Earth's topography at the bottom of the glacier also slows the ice stream. However, just the opposite occurs with basal sliding. Such sliding features the glacier jerking forward due to lubrication from bottom melt-water.

Ice streams such as the Erebus Glacier Tongue wax and wane like the moon. Indeed, British researchers in 2006 discovered a correlation between lunar tides (caused by gravitational pull) and variances in flow speed of the Rutland Ice Stream in Antarctica. Previously a team of U.S. NASA, Penn State, and University of Newcastle; Newcastle upon Tyne, England; made similar observations of Whillan's Ice Stream in Antarctica.

However, more established research unrelated to lunar forces is available regarding cyclical glacier growth and decay. Such research reveals that glacier growth can produce slow-motion surges in the glacier's movement. Such surges may occur over a period of months or years. Then the movement stops. Scientists have measured Erebus Glacier Tongue's length as growing about 160 meters yearly.

The Erebus Glacier Tongue flow pushes the glacier into Erebus Bay where it butts against seasonal ice pack. This massive but gradual collision of ice against ice creates pressure ridges in the glacier. Portions of the glacier tongue become unstable, rupture, and calve icebergs. Such instability in part comes from the flexing and tension the ice beam undergoes from being cantilevered over the sea. Moreover, the river of ice carries with it weaknesses introduced by earlier fractures experienced during its journey down the slopes of Mount Erebus.

== Effects on the ocean ==
The floating glacier has a major effect on the local ocean. Its melting has been thought to create Double diffusive convection effects. A 2010 expedition funded by the Marsden Fund supported deployment of Timothy Haskell's sea ice camp right next to the tongue. Observations from the camp showed how the tide flowed beneath and along the tongue and was affected by submarine topography.

== Iceberg calving ==
The forces of wave action from McMurdo Sound, tides, and internal stresses exploit the glacier tongue's weaknesses. Subsequently, small icebergs and bergy bits typically calf from the Erebus Glacier Tongue but only when the sea ice has broken up. Subsequently, iceberg calving is seasonal and periodic, as open water is needed to release the bergs into Erebus Bay.

Waters at the glacier tongue that receive the icebergs vary in depth from a minimum of 155–475 metres (509–1,558 ft). Members of Robert F. Scott's Terra Nova Expedition first observed the glacier tongue calving in March 1911 when a 4 km section broke off during a gale. A similar event in March 1990 produced a 100-million ton iceberg, 3.5 km long, from the glacier tongue. In addition, observers note that the glacier tongue experienced a major calving event in the early 1940s. Such calving along the glacier snout naturally leads to shortening, while icebergs released from the glacier tongue sides contribute to the glacier's narrowing. The Erebus Glacier Tongue produces flat-topped or tabular icebergs. It calved most recently in 2013, around a decade earlier than expected.

== Gallery ==
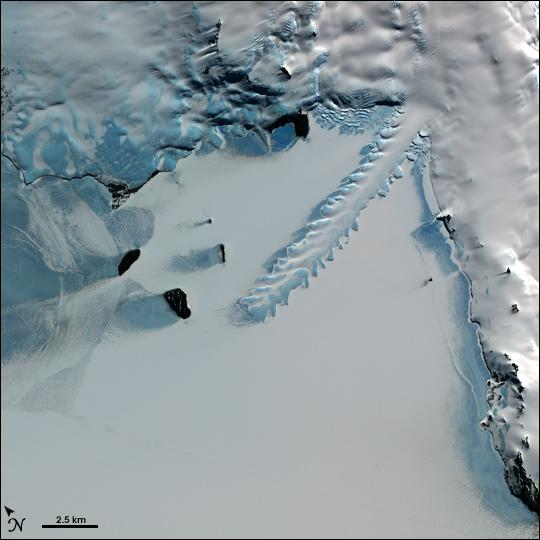
Erebus Glacier Tongue false color satellite view

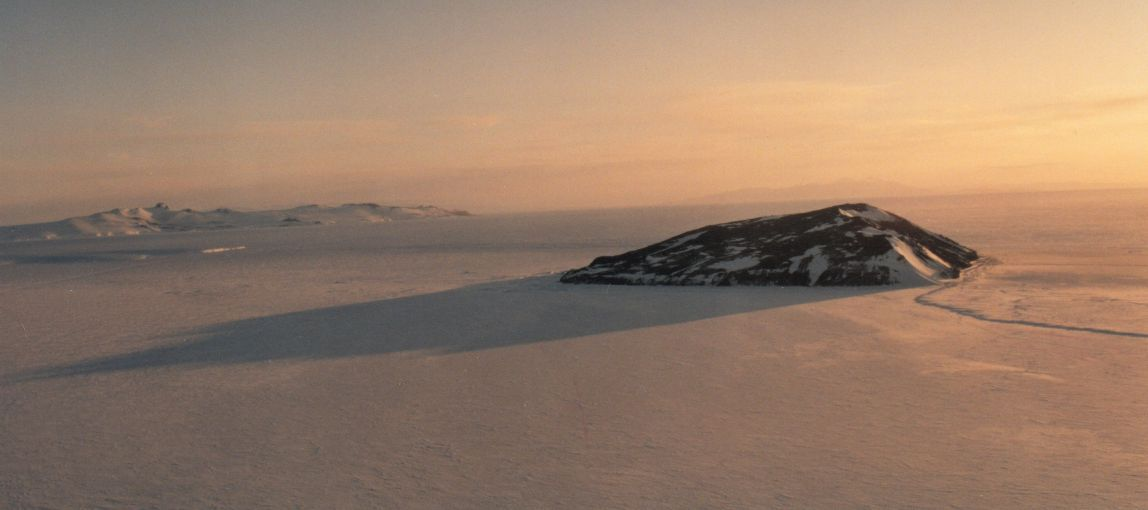
Tent Island, Erebus Bay

== See also ==
- Glacier
- McMurdo Sound
- Mount Erebus
- Ross Island
- List of glaciers in the Antarctic
- Iceberg
