= Clemence Massif =

Massif in Antarctica

- Location within Antarctica

Highest point
- Elevation: 1,274 m (4,180 ft)
- Prominence: 1,274 m (4,180 ft)
- Listing: Ribu

Clemence Massif (72°11′S 68°43′E) is an elongated, mostly ice-free massif, 15 nautical miles (28 km) long and rising to 1,274 metres (4,180 ft), standing 30 nautical miles (56 km) southeast of Shaw Massif on the east side of Lambert Glacier. It was discovered by Australian National Antarctic Research Expeditions personnel from Beaver aircraft piloted by Flying Officer D.M. Johnston, Royal Australian Air Force (RAAF), in 1957, and named by the Antarctic Names Committee of Australia for Squadron Leader P.H. Clemence, who commanded the RAAF Antarctic Flight at Mawson Station in 1957.
