= Svarthausen Nunatak =

Svarthausen Nunatak (69°49′S 74°30′E) is a jagged, dark rock nunatak with a small outlier to the southwest, lying on the west side of Polar Times Glacier, about 4 nautical miles (7 km) south-southeast of Mount Caroline Mikkelsen. Mapped from air photographs by the Lars Christensen Expedition, 1936–37, and named Svarthausen (the black crag).
