= Browns Glacier =

Glacier in Antarctica

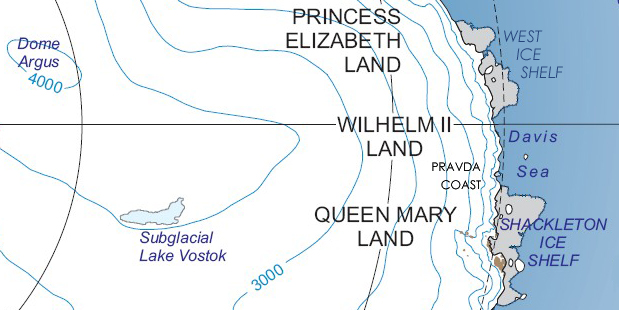
- Location of Princess Elizabeth Land

- Location within Antarctica
- Location: Princess Elizabeth Land
- Coordinates: 68°56′S 78°00′E
- Length: 4 nmi (7 km; 5 mi)
- Thickness: unknown
- Terminus: Ranvik Bay
- Status: unknown

Browns Glacier (68°56′S 78°0′E) is a small glacier 4 nautical miles (7 km) north of Chaos Glacier, flowing westward into the northern extremity of Ranvik Bay. The glacier was charted by Norwegian cartographers from air photographs taken by the Lars Christensen Expedition (1936–37), and was further identified in John H. Roscoe's 1952 study of this area from U.S. Navy Operation Highjump (1946–47) photography. It was named by Roscoe for Lieutenant (j.g.) Eduardo P. Brown, U.S. Navy, photographic officer with the western task group of Operation Highjump.

== See also ==
- List of glaciers in the Antarctic
- Glaciology
