= Søstrene Islands =

Island group in Antarctica

Søstrene Islands (69°33′S 75°30′E) is a group of small islands and rocks that rise above the northern part of the Publications Ice Shelf at the head of Prydz Bay in Antarctica. They were discovered and charted in February 1935 by Captain Klarius Mikkelsen in the Norwegian whaling ship Thorshavn, sent out by Lars Christensen. They gave the name Søstrene after the islands by that name lying in the entrance to the Oslofjord, Norway.

The Søstrene Islands include Debutante Island.

== See also ==
- List of antarctic and sub-antarctic islands
