= Wilson Bluff (Antarctica) =

Coordinates: 74°20′S 66°47′E

Wilson Bluff is a large, rather flat-topped rock outcrop at the south end of Lambert Glacier, 16 nautical miles (30 km) west-northwest of Mount Borland. This feature is 5 sq. mi in area and has a tail of moraine extending northeast for several miles. Plotted from air photos taken by ANARE (Australian National Antarctic Research Expeditions) in 1956 and visited by an airborne field party led by G.A. Knuckey in October 1958. Named by Antarctic Names Committee of Australia (ANCA) for Flight Lieutenant H.O. Wilson, RAAF, pilot at Mawson Station in 1958.
