= William Bankes Amery =

British civil servant and accountant (1883–1951)

William Bankes Amery CBE (26 October 1883 – 26 November 1951) was a British civil servant and accountant, also known as W. Bankes Amery and W. Bankes-Amery.

The Amery Ice Shelf in Antarctica was named after him by Douglas Mawson.

== Life ==
The eldest son of Thomas Arthur Amery, of Norwell, Newark, Nottinghamshire, Amery was educated at Christ's Hospital. Making a career in the civil service, he was an Assistant Secretary in the War Trade Department from 1916 to 1919, then an Establishment Officer at the Ministry of Transport until 1922. That year, he became a Finance Officer in the Overseas Settlement Department of the Dominions Office, and in 1925 was appointed as Representative of the British government in Australia under the Empire Settlement Act 1922, that is, as a key official of the Home Children child migration scheme. In 1937 he returned to the Dominions Office, and in 1939 he was appointed as Controller of the Export Licensing Department of the Board of Trade.

In 1940 Amery joined the newly re-established Ministry of Food, then from 1942 to 1945 was Head of the United Kingdom Food Mission to Australia, representing the Ministry of Food. From 1946 until his death he was a member of the Board of British Phosphate Commissioners.

In 1940, Amery married Edna Mary Truman. He died in November 1951, when Who's Who gave a London address for him and reported that he was a member of the Savile Club.
