= Brattstrand Bluffs =

Rock cliffs on the coast of Antarctica

Coordinates: 69°13′S 77°0′E

The Brattstrand Bluffs are rock cliffs on the coast of Antarctica, about 6 kilometres (4 mi) east-north-east of Hovde Island and Amanda Bay. They were first mapped from aerial photographs taken by the Norwegian Lars Christensen Expedition of 1936, and named Brattstranda ("abrupt shore").
