= Twilight Bay =

Bay in Antarctica

Coordinates: 68°32′S 69°48′E

Twilight Bay () is a small re-entrant of the ice shelf into the plateau on the west side of the Amery Ice Shelf. Photographed from ANARE (Australian National Antarctic Research Expeditions) aircraft in 1956. The position of the feature was fixed by ANARE survey party in February 1968. So named because the survey party was flown into the area after sunset, necessitating navigation and photo identification in twilight.
