= Graben =

Depressed block of planetary crust bordered by parallel normal faults

Diagram illustrating the structural relationship between grabens and horsts

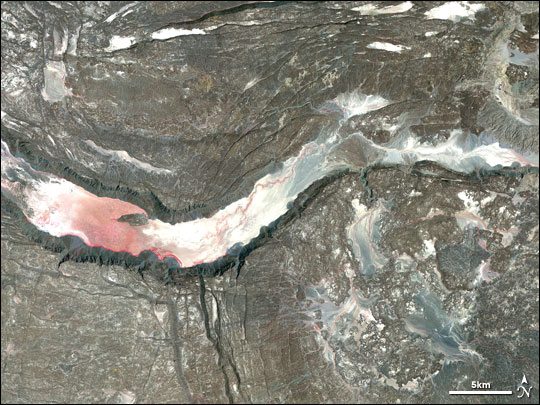
Infrared-enhanced satellite image of a graben in the Afar Depression

A graben (/ˈɡrɑːbən/) in geology is a depressed block of the crust of a planet or moon, bordered by parallel normal faults.

== Etymology ==
Graben is a loan word from German, meaning "ditch" or "trench," up to large valley like Upper Rhine Graben. The first known usage of the word in the geologic context was by Eduard Suess in 1883. The plural form in German is Gräben; in English, either graben or grabens.

== Formation ==
A graben is a valley with a distinct escarpment on each side caused by the displacement of a block of land downward. Graben often occur side by side with horsts. Horst and graben structures indicate tensional forces and crustal stretching.

Graben are produced by sets of normal faults that have parallel fault traces, where the displacement of the hanging wall is downward, while that of the footwall is upward. The faults typically dip toward the center of the graben from both sides. Horsts are parallel blocks that remain between graben; the bounding faults of a horst typically dip away from the center line of the horst. Single or multiple graben can produce a rift valley.

== Half-graben ==
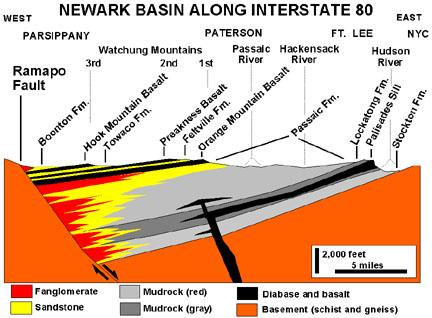
The Newark Basin, an early Mesozoic half-graben

In many rifts, the graben are asymmetric, with a major fault along only one of the boundaries, and these are known as half-graben. The polarity (throw direction) of the main bounding faults typically alternates along the length of the rift. The asymmetry of a half-graben strongly affects syntectonic deposition. Comparatively little sediment enters the half-graben across the main bounding fault because of footwall uplift on the drainage systems. The exception is at any major offset in the bounding fault, where a relay ramp may provide an important sediment input point. Most of the sediment will enter the half-graben down the unfaulted hanging wall side (e.g., Lake Baikal).

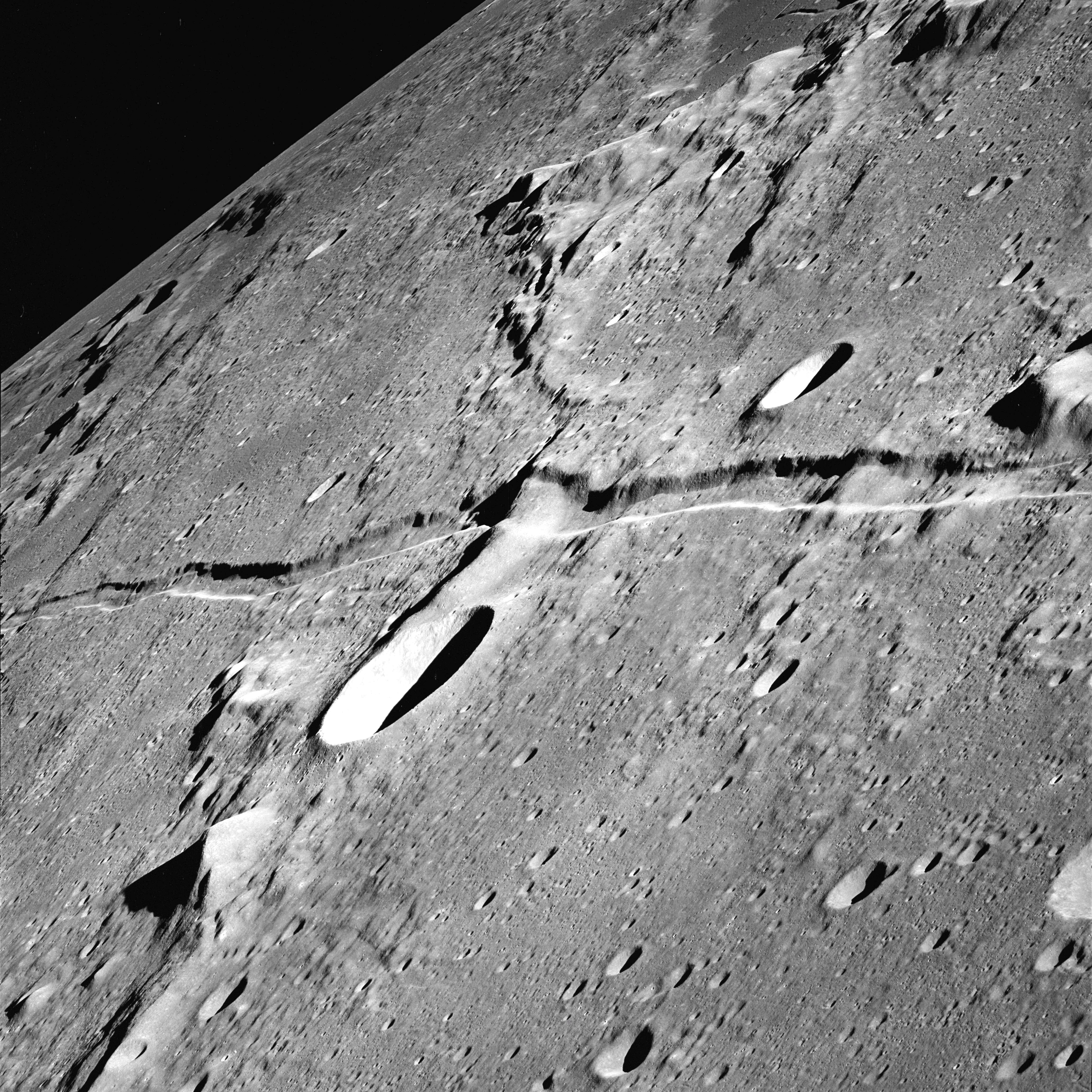
Rima Ariadaeus on the Moon is thought to be a graben. The lack of erosion on the Moon makes its structure with two parallel faults and the sunken block in between particularly obvious.

== Examples ==
=== Africa ===
- East African Rift Valley
- Lucapa Graben, Lunda Norte Province, Angola

=== Antarctica ===
- Lambert Graben, Antarctica

=== Asia ===
- Narmada River Valley, central India
- lower Godavari River Valley, southern India
- Baikal Rift Zone, Siberia, Russia
- Moma Graben, Sakha Republic, Russia
- Büyük Menderes Graben, Turkey
- Fossa Magna, Honshu, Japan
- Ariake Sea as part of the Unzen graben, Kyushu, Japan
- Beppu–Shimabara graben, Kyushu, Japan

=== Europe ===
- Rhine valley, border area of west Germany and northeast France
- Oslo graben around Oslo, Norway
- Central Lowlands, Scotland
- Worcester Basin, England
- Central Graben, North Sea
- Viking Graben, North Sea
- Vättern, Sweden
- Lowtherville Graben, Ventnor, Isle of Wight, England

=== North America ===
==== Canada ====
- Ottawa-Bonnechere Graben, Ontario and Quebec, Canada
- Saguenay Graben, Quebec, Canada

==== Guatemala ====
- Guatemala City valley, Guatemala

==== United States ====
- Basin and Range Province of southwestern North America is an example of multiple horst/graben structures, including Death Valley, with Salt Lake Valley being the easternmost and Owens Valley being the westernmost.
- Lake George Basin, New York, U.S.
- Culpeper Basin, Virginia and Maryland, U.S.
- South Georgia rift, Alabama, Georgia, South Carolina, U.S.
- Lake Tahoe Basin, California and Nevada, U.S.
- Republic Graben, Republic, Washington, U.S.
- Rio Grande Rift Valley in Colorado/New Mexico/Texas of the United States
- Rough Creek Graben, Kentucky, U.S.
- Santa Clara Valley, California, U.S.
- Western Snake River Plain, Idaho, U.S.
- Southwest San Bernardino Valley (Arizona), U.S.

==== Multi-national ====
- Eastern North America Rift Basins, Canada and the U.S.
- Midcontinent Rift System, Canada and the U.S.
- Salton Trough, Mexico and the U.S.

=== Oceania ===
- Firth of Thames of Hauraki Gulf and Hauraki Plains of Hauraki Rift (Hauraki half grabens), North Island, New Zealand
- Tikitere Graben within the Taupo Rift, North Island, New Zealand.
- Gulf St Vincent, South Australia, Australia
- Tamar Valley, Tasmania, Australia

=== South America ===
- Guanabara Graben, Rio de Janeiro, Brazil

== See also ==
- European Cenozoic Rift System
- Fossa (geology) – Long, narrow, shallow depression
