= Meknattane Nunataks =

The Meknattane Nunataks (69°48′S 75°12′E) are a cluster of rock outcrops on the east side of Polarforschung Glacier, Antarctica, where it flows to Publications Ice Shelf. The feature consists of a massive ridge with broken outcrops to the south and east. It was mapped from air photos by the Lars Christensen Expedition (1936) and named "Meknattane" (the middle crags). The nunataks were also photographed by U.S. Navy Operation Highjump (1946–47), and the geology of the feature was investigated by I.R. McLeod, geologist with the Australian National Antarctic Research Expeditions Prince Charles Mountains survey party in January 1969.
