= Stornes Peninsula =

Peninsula in Princess Elizabeth Land, Antarctica

Stornes Peninsula (69°26′S 76°5′E) is a rocky, jagged peninsula about 3 nautical miles (6 km) long, projecting into Prydz Bay just west of Larsemann Hills. First mapped by Norwegian cartographers from air photos taken by the Lars Christensen Expedition, 1936–37, and named Stornes (big promontory, or ness).

== See also ==
- Blundell Peak
