= Hovde Island =

Antarctic natural landmark

- Location within Antarctica

Geography
- Location: Antarctica
- Coordinates: 69°15′S 76°52′E

Administration
- Administered under the Antarctic Treaty System

Demographics
- Population: Uninhabited

Hovde Island is a small, rounded, rocky island in Prydz Bay, lying at the extremity of the small glacier tongue from Hovde Glacier. It was mapped from air photograph by the Lars Christensen Expedition (1936) and named Hovden (the knoll). The recommended form and generic term takes into account the offshore nature of the feature.

== See also ==
- List of antarctic and sub-antarctic islands
