= Statler Hills =

Statler Hills (69°55′S 73°11′E) is a group of low rocky hills just north of Rogers Glacier on the east margin of Amery Ice Shelf Delineated identified in 1952 by John H. Roscoe from air photos taken by U.S. Navy Operation Highjump (1946–47), and named by him for L.R. Statier, air crewman on Operation Highjump photographic flights over this and other coastal areas between 14 and 164 East longitude.
