= Polarforschung Glacier =

Glacier in Antarctica

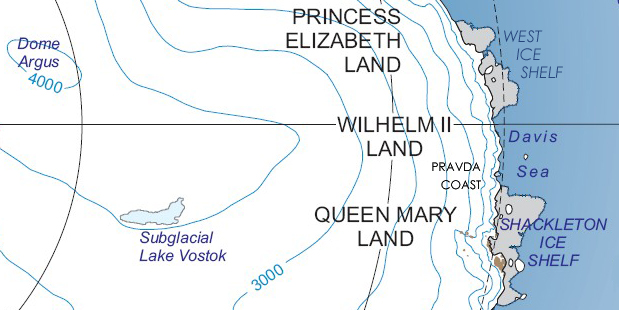
- Location of Princess Elizabeth Land

- Location within Antarctica
- Type: heavily crevassed
- Location: Princess Elizabeth Land
- Coordinates: 69°50′S 75°7′E
- Thickness: unknown
- Terminus: Publications Ice Shelf
- Status: unknown

Polarforschung Glacier (69°50′S 75°7′E) is a heavily crevassed glacier flowing northward along the west side of Meknattane Nunataks to Publications Ice Shelf. Vestknatten Nunatak lies within the mouth of the glacier. Delineated in 1952 by John H. Roscoe from aerial photographs taken by U.S. Navy Operation Highjump (1946–47), and named by him after the journal Polarforschung, issued in Kiel (West Germany).

== See also ==
- List of glaciers in the Antarctic
- Glaciology
