= Jennings Promontory =

- Promotory
- Coordinates: 70°10′S 72°33′E
- Location: Amery Ice Shelf, Ingrid Christensen Coast

Jennings Promontory (70°10′S 72°33′E) is a prominent rock promontory on the eastern margin of Amery Ice Shelf between the Branstetter Rocks and Kreitzer Glacier.

== Exploration ==
Jennings Promontory was delineated in 1952 by John H. Roscoe from air photos taken by U.S. Navy Operation Highjump (1946–47), and named by him for Lieutenant Joe C. Jennings, United States Navy, co-pilot and navigator on Operation Highjump photographic flights in this area.

== Location ==
Jennings Promontory defines the western end of the Ingrid Christensen Coast, which extends east to the West Ice Shelf. It is northeast of Gillock Island, north of the Reinbolt Hills and Linton-Smith Nunataks, and south of the Mistichelli Hills, McKaskle Hills and Statler Hills. The promontory is a bedrock outcrop in a region of Cambrian charnockite surrounded by high-grade metamorphic rocks.

== Features to the west ==
=== Jennings Lake ===
70°10′S 72°32′E. A narrow meltwater lake, 3 nautical miles (5.6 km; 3.5 mi) long, at the foot of Jennings Promontory on the eastern margin of the Amery Ice Shelf. Delineated by John H. Roscoe in 1952 from aerial photographs taken by USN Operation Highjump (1946-47), and named by him in association with Jennings Promontory.

== Features to the south ==
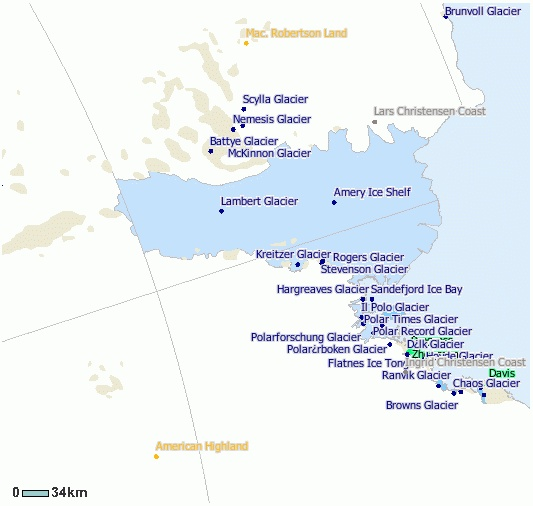
Lambert Glacier and Amery Ice Shelf. Jennings Promontory on east (lower in map) shore between Kreitzer Glacier and Stevenson Glacier.

=== Linton-Smith Nunataks ===
70°17′S 72°45′E. A group of nunataks between Jennings Promontory and Reinbolt Hills on the E side of Amery Ice Shelf. First photographed by USN Operation Highjump (1946-47). The position was fixed by intersection from Corry Rocks and Rubeli Bluff by ANARE surveyors in 1968. Named by ANCA for N. Linton-Smith, senior technical officer with the Antarctic Division, Melbourne, a member of the ANARE Amery Ice Shelf glaciological traverse in 1970.

=== Kreitzer Glacier ===
70°22′S 72°36′E. A glacier flowing northwest between Jennings Promontory and Reinbolt Hills into the east part of Amery Ice Shelf. Delineated in 1952 by John H. Roscoe from aerial photographs taken by USN Operation Highjump, 1946-47. Named by Roscoe for Lt. William R. Kreitzer, USN, commander of one of the three Operation Highjump aircraft used in photographing this and other coastal areas between 14° and 164° East.

=== Rubeli Bluff ===
70°26′S 72°27′E. A bluff on the north end of the Reinbolt Hills, at the east margin of Amery Ice Shelf. A survey station was established on the feature during the ANARE tellurometer traverse from Larsemann Hills in 1968. Named by ANCA for M.N. Rubeli, surveyor at Mawson Station, who was in charge of the traverse.

=== Reinbolt Hills ===
70°29′S 72°30′E. A group of rocky hills, low to moderate in height and about 5 nautical miles (9.3 km; 5.8 mi) long, situated 9 nautical miles (17 km; 10 mi) east of Gillock Island at the eastern margin of the Amery Ice Shelf. Delineated in 1952 by John H. Roscoe from air photos taken by USN Operation Highjump (1946-47), and named by him for Lt. Fred L. Reinbolt, USN, co-pilot on Operation Highjump photographic flights over this area.

== Features to the north ==
=== Thil Island ===
70°08′S 72°39′E. A small rocky island lying 1 nautical mile (1.9 km; 1.2 mi) northeast of Jennings Promontory in the eastern part of the Amery Ice Shelf. Delineated in 1952 by John H. Roscoe from air photos taken by USN Operation Highjump, 1946-47. Named by Roscoe for R.B. Thil, air crewman on Operation Highjump photographic flights over this area.

=== Branstetter Rocks ===
70°07′S 72°40′E. A small group of rocks lying 1 nautical mile (1.9 km; 1.2 mi) east-northeast of Thil Island in the eastern part of Amery Ice Shelf. Delineated in 1952 by John H. Roscoe from air photos taken by United States Navy Operation Highjump (1946-47), and named by him for J.C. Branstetter, air crewman on Operation Highjump photographic flights in the area.

=== Stevenson Glacier ===
70°06′S 72°48′E. A glacier flowing northwest into the eastern side of the Amery Ice Shelf, just north of Branstetter Rocks. Delineated in 1952 by John H. Roscoe from air photos taken by United States Navy Operation Highjump (1946-47), and named by him for Lieutenant James C. Stevenson, co-pilot on Operation Highjump photographic flights in the area.

=== Peterson Icefalls ===
70°05′S 72°44′E. A line of icefalls at the terminus of Stevenson Glacier, where the latter enters the east part of Amery Ice Shelf. Delineated in 1952 by John H. Roscoe from aerial photographs taken by United States Navy Operation Highjump (1946-47). Named by Roscoe for J.C. Peterson, Jr., air crewman on Operation Highjump photographic flights in the area.

=== Mistichelli Hills ===
70°02′S 72°52′E. A group of moderately low, rocky coastal hills, 1 nautical mile (1.9 km; 1.2 mi) southwest of McKaskle Hills, on the east margin of the Amery Ice Shelf. Delineated in 1952 by John H. Roscoe from air photos taken by United States Navy Operation Highjump (1946-47). Named by Roscoe for G. Mistichelli, air crewman on Operation Highjump photographic flights over the area.

=== Smith Ridge ===
70°02′S 72°50′E. A prominent ridge in the Mistichelli Hills, at the east margin of the Amery Ice Shelf. The ridge was occupied as a survey station by ANARE in 1968. Named by ANCA for R.S. Smith, geophysicist at Mawson Station in 1968, who assisted in the survey.

=== McKaskle Hills ===
70°01′S 73°00′E. A group of moderately low, rocky coastal hills between Rogers Glacier and Mistichelli Hills, on the eastern margin of the Amery Ice Shelf. Delineated in 1952 by John H. Roscoe from air photos taken by United States Navy Operation Highjump (1946-47), and named by him for H.A. McKaskle, air crewman on Operation Highjump photographic flights over coastal areas between 14| and 164| East longitude.

== Sources ==
- Alberts, Fred G., ed. (1995), Geographic Names of the Antarctic (PDF), USGS Report (2 ed.), United States Board on Geographic Names, p. 3, Bibcode:1995usgs.rept....3U This article incorporates public domain material from websites or documents of the United States Board on Geographic Names.
- Xiaochun Liu; Bor-ming Jahn; Yue Zhao; Jian Liu; Liudong Ren (February 2014), "Geochemistry and geochronology of Mesoproterozoic basement rocks from the Eastern Amery Ice Shelf and southwestern Prydz Bay, East Antarctica: Implications for a long-lived magmatic accretion in a continental arc", American Journal of Science, 314 (2): 508–547, Bibcode:2014AmJS..314..508L, doi:10.2475/02.2014.03
