= Lambert Graben =

Graben in Antarctica

Coordinates: 70°S 70°E

Lambert Graben is a graben in Antarctica. It intersects the coast at Prydz Bay and contains the largest glacier in the world, Lambert Glacier. The graben is a Permian rift which contains coal beds. The graben has been correlated with the coal bearing Godavari Valley of the Indian Peninsula prior to the breakup of Gondwana.

== Geology ==
The graben is a Late Palaeozoic-Mesozoic triple junction failed rift. Precambrian metamorphic rocks, composed of granulite-facies sequences intruded by granites and pegmatites, are overlain by the Permian sedimentary Amery Group. These rocks outcrop on the Platforma Kamenistaja and Else Platform within the northern Jetty Peninsula (Jetty Oasis).
