= Ice tongue =

Long, narrow sheet of ice projecting from a coastline

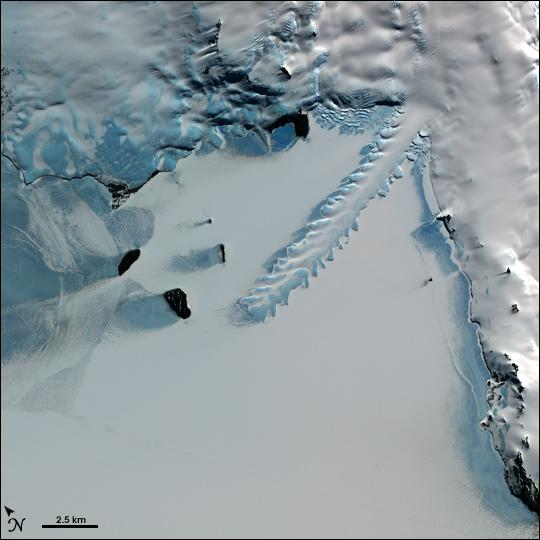
The Erebus Glacier Tongue, coming off the Erebus Glacier from 3,800 m (12,500 ft). Mount Erebus, Ross Island, Antarctica. The ice tongue is protruding into McMurdo Sound (frozen in this image).

An ice tongue or glacier tongue exists when there is a narrow floating part of a glacier that extends out into a body of water beyond the glacier's lowest contact with the Earth's crust. An ice tongue forms when a glacier that is confined by a valley moves very rapidly out into a lake or ocean, relative to other ice along the coastline. When such ice surges past adjacent coastal ice, the boundary experiences physical forces described as "shearing".

Ice tongues can gain mass from water freezing at their base, by snow falling on top of them, or by additional surges from the main glacier. Mass is then lost by calving or by melting. Icebergs are often formed when ice tongues break off in part or wholly from the main glacier. A few examples of ice tongues are the Erebus Glacier Tongue, Drygalski Ice Tongue, and Thwaites Ice Tongue.

== Tidal flexure and mechanical stability ==
Early theoretical work by Gordon Holdsworth described how an ice tongue bends when tidal oscillations raise or lower the surrounding sea surface. Treating the tongue as a beam pinned at its grounding-line hinge, Holdsworth showed that most of the vertical movement is absorbed within the first few kilometres downstream of that pivot. For tongues up to about 3.5 km (2.2 mi) long and roughly 200 m (660 ft) thick, a fall or rise of only 0.5 m (1 ft 8 in) in sea level can generate hinge stresses approaching 15 bar—high enough to open surface crevasses. Once a tongue exceeds roughly 4 km (2.5 mi) in length the peak stress no longer scales with length; instead it depends mainly on thickness and the amplitude of tidal forcing.

Holdsworth also examined how repeated flexure causes the ice to yield over time. In an elastic–plastic model the hinge stress cannot exceed about 2 bar; after that point further tidal deflection is accommodated by viscous flow rather than by extra stress. His calculations suggest that calving of large, tabular bergs requires either sea-level excursions greater than ±1 m or bending along more than one axis, such as when tides and ocean swell act together. The analysis therefore links an ice tongue's stability to its geometric properties and the local tidal regime, explaining why some Antarctic tongues retreat rapidly while others persist for decades.
