= Rogers Glacier =

Glacier in Antarctica

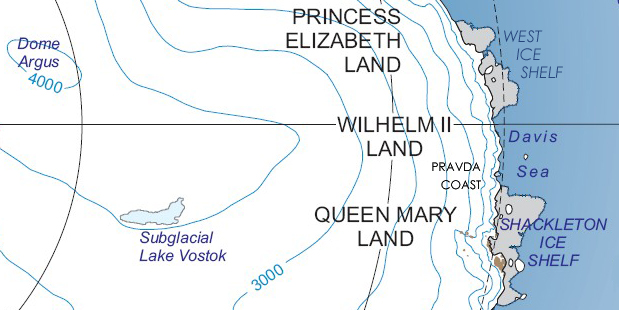
- Location of Princess Elizabeth Land

- Location within Antarctica
- Location: Princess Elizabeth Land
- Coordinates: 69°59′S 73°4′E
- Thickness: unknown
- Terminus: Amery Ice Shelf
- Status: unknown

Rogers Glacier (69°59′S 73°4′E) is a broad glacier entering the eastern side of Amery Ice Shelf close northward of McKaskle Hills. Delineated in 1952 by John H. Roscoe from air photos taken by U.S. Navy Operation Highjump (1946–47), and named by him for Lieutenant Commander William J. Rogers, Jr., U.S. Navy, plane commander of one of the three air crews during Operation Highjump which took air photos of the coastal areas between 14 and 164 East longitude.

== See also ==
- List of glaciers in the Antarctic
- Glaciology
