= Lars Christensen Coast =

Coastal area in Antarctica

Coordinates: 69°S 69°E

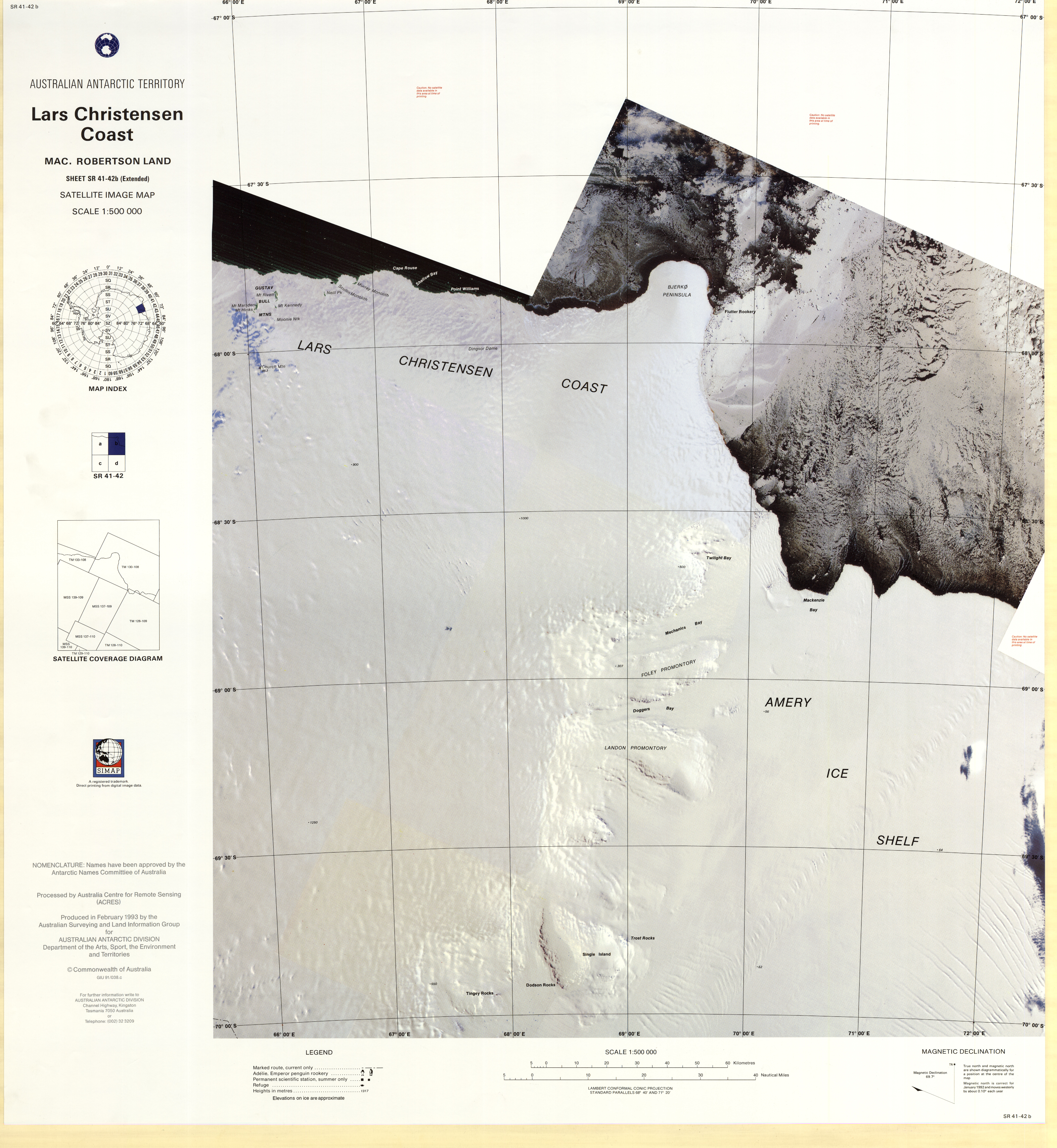
1:500,000 map of Lars Christensen Coast and Amery Ice Shelf

The Lars Christensen Coast is that portion of the coast of Antarctica lying between Murray Monolith, in 66°54′E, and the head of the Amery Ice Shelf in 71°0′E. The seaward portions of this area (along the Amery Ice Front to Murray Monolith) were discovered and sailed along by Norwegian whalers employed by Lars Christensen of Sandefjord, Norway for whom this coast is named. Christensen personally participated in some of the exploration conducted in Antarctica by his firm, 1926–37. Exploration and mapping of the southwestern (interior) side of the Amery Ice Shelf was accomplished by Australian expeditions during the 1950s.
