= Mount Maguire =

Mountain in Antarctica

Mount Maguire (74°1′S 66°55′E) is a large flat-topped mountain with a distinctive pointed nunatak on the east side, located 22 nautical miles (41 km) south of Cumpston Massif, Antarctica, near the head of Lambert Glacier. It was mapped from Australian National Antarctic Research Expeditions air photos and surveys, 1956–58, and was named by the Antarctic Names Committee of Australia for Sergeant O. Maguire, RAAF, a radio technician at Mawson Station in 1958.
