= Mount Caroline Mikkelsen =

Mountain in Princess Elizabeth Land, Antarctica

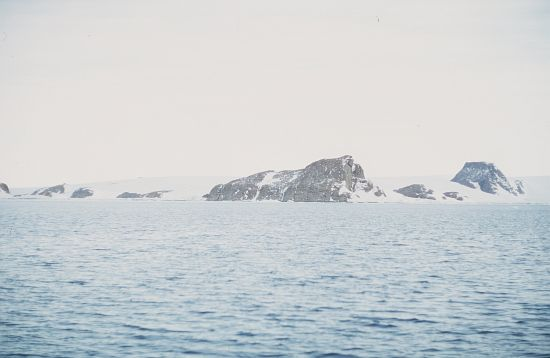
- Mount Caroline Mikkelsen in 1966

Highest point
- Elevation: 235 m (771 ft)
- Coordinates: 69°45′S 74°24′E

Geography
- Location: Ingrid Christensen Coast, Antarctica

Mount Caroline Mikkelsen is a small coastal mountain discovered on February 20, 1935. Its height is 235 metres (770 ft) and it is between Hargreaves Glacier and Polar Times Glacier on Ingrid Christensen Coast. The mountain overlooks the southern extremity of Prydz Bay, 4 nautical miles (7 km) north-northwest of Svarthausen Nunatak, and is the highest summit in the vicinity. It was discovered by Captain Klarius Mikkelsen in the Thorshavn, a Norwegian whaling ship sent out by Lars Christensen. It is named for Captain Mikkelsen's wife Caroline Mikkelsen, who accompanied her husband on this voyage and became the first woman to set foot on Antarctica.
