= Lambert Glacier =

Major glacier in East Antarctica

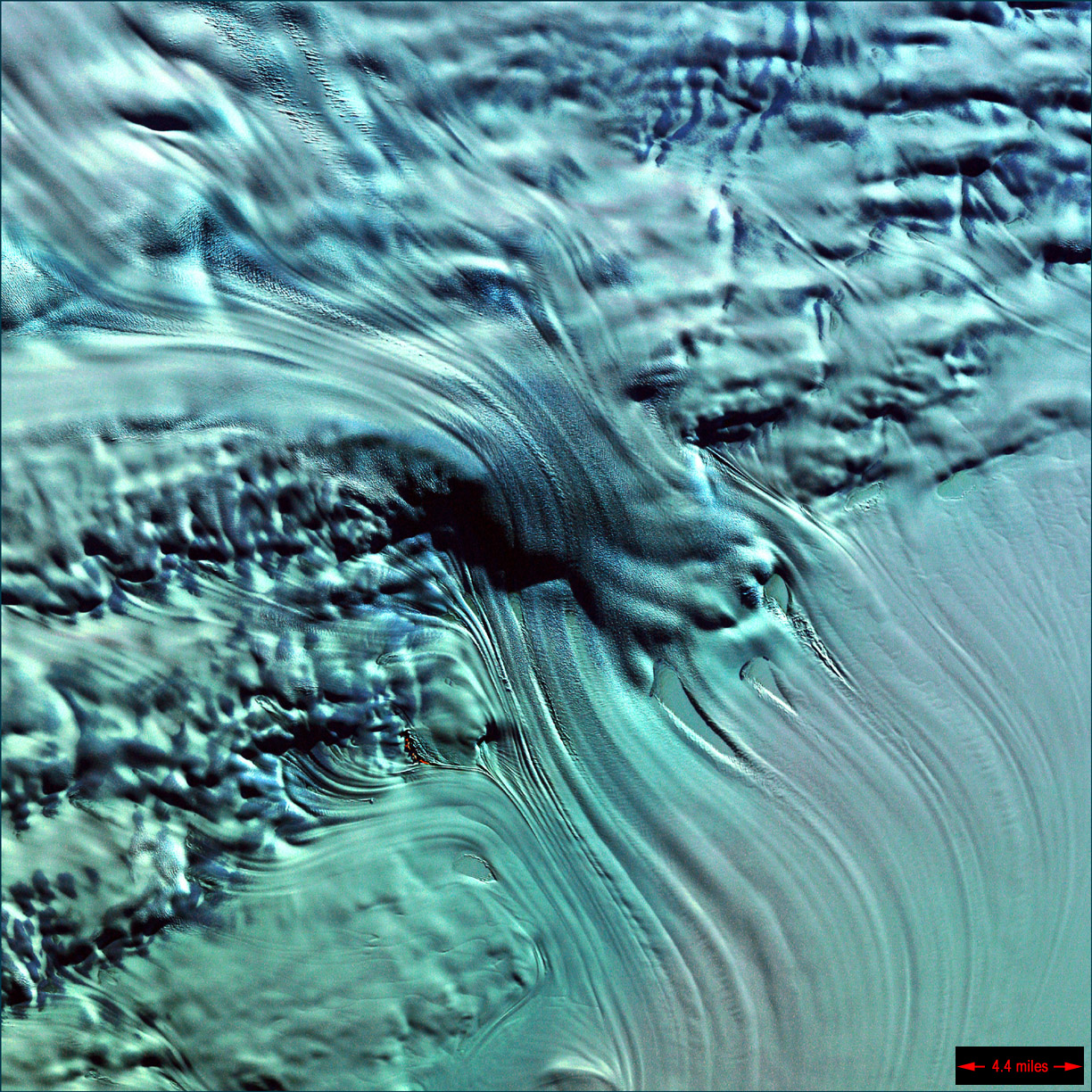
An icefall feeding into the Lambert Glacier, Antarctica

Lambert Glacier is a major glacier in East Antarctica. At about 96 km (60 mi) wide, over 435 km (270 mi) long, and about 2,500 m (8,200 ft) deep, it is the world's largest glacier. It drains 8% of the Antarctic ice sheet to the east and south of the Prince Charles Mountains and flows northward to the Amery Ice Shelf. It flows in part of Lambert Graben and exits the continent at Prydz Bay.

This glacier was delineated and named in 1952 by American geographer John H. Roscoe who made a detailed study of this area from aerial photographs taken by Operation Highjump, 1946–47. He gave the name "Baker Three Glacier", using the code name of the Navy photographic aircraft and crew that made three flights in this coastal area in March 1947 resulting in geographic discoveries. The glacier was described in Gazetteer No. 14, Geographic Names of Antarctica (U.S. Board on Geographic Names, 1956), but the feature did not immediately appear on published maps. As a result the name Lambert Glacier, as applied by the Antarctic Names Committee of Australia (ANCA) in 1957 following mapping of the area by Australian National Antarctic Research Expeditions (ANARE) in 1956, has become established for this feature. It was named for Bruce P. Lambert, Director of National Mapping in the Australian Department of National Development.

== Tributaries ==
=== Fisher Glacier ===
A prominent western tributary to the Lambert Glacier, about 100 nautical miles (190 km; 120 mi) long, flowing east past the north sides of Mount Menzies and Mount Rubin and joining the main stream of the Lambert Glacier just east of Mount Stinear. It was sighted from ANARE aircraft by K.B. Mather in 1957, and was named by ANCA for N.H. Fisher, chief geologist at the Bureau of Mineral Resources, Department of National Development, Australia.

=== Geysen Glacier ===
A large tributary to the Fisher Glacier, flowing northeast between Mount Bayliss and Mount Ruker. It was plotted from air photos taken by ANARE in 1956 and 1957, and was named by ANCA for Hendrik Geysen, officer in charge of Mawson Station, 1960.

=== Mellor Glacier ===
A tributary glacier, flowing north-northeast between Mount Newton and Mount Maguire and coalescing with Collins Glacier just prior to its junction with Lambert Glacier at Patrick Point. It was mapped from air photos taken by ANARE in 1956, and was named by ANCA after English-born glaciologist Malcolm Mellor (1933–91), who worked at Mawson Station in 1957, and as an engineer with the U.S. Army's Cold Regions Research and Engineering Laboratory from 1961 to 1991.

=== Collins Glacier ===
73°41′S 65°55′E. A glacier about 11 nautical miles (20 km) wide at its confluence with the Mellor Glacier, which it feeds from the southwest, located north of Mount Newton. It was mapped by ANARE from air photos taken in 1956 and 1960, and named by ANCA for Neville Joseph Collins, senior diesel mechanic at Mawson Station, 1960.

=== Arriens Glacier ===
73°27′48″S 68°24′1″E. A small glacier, south of Casey Point flowing west to reach Lambert Glacier. It was plotted from ANARE aerial photographs taken in 1956, 1960 and 1973, and named by ANCA after P. Arriens, geochronologist with the ANARE Prince Charles Mountains survey party in 1973.

== Other features ==
=== Seavers Nunataks ===
73°10′S 61°58′E. Two nunataks 16 nautical miles (30 km) west of Mount Scherger, near the head of Fisher Glacier. Mapped from ANARE air photos and surveys, 1958 and 1960–61. Named by ANCA) for J.A. Seavers, assistant cook at Mawson Station, a member of the ANARE field party in this area in 1961.

=== Mount Seddon ===
73°6′S 65°0′E. A mountain with two peaks separated by an ice-filled saddle, standing 20 nautical miles (37 km) west of Mount Stinear on the north side of Fisher Glacier. Discovered from ANARE aircraft in 1957. Named by ANCA for Norman R. Seddon, Managing Director of B.P. Australia Ltd. since 1957, in recognition of the assistance given to ANARE by the company.

=== Patrick Point ===
73°28′S 66°51′E. The northern point of Cumpston Massif, at the junction of Mellor and Lambert Glaciers. Mapped from air photos taken by ANARE in 1956. Named by ANCA for Patrick Albion, radio operator at Mawson Station, 1956.

=== Mount Newton ===
74°1′S 65°30′E. A large humped mountain with a boulder strewn surface and conical peak near the center, standing between flow of Collins and Mellor Glaciers. Mapped by ANARE from air photos taken in 1956. Named by ANCA for Dr. Geoff Newton, medical officer at Mawson Station, 1960.

=== Robertson Nunatak ===
71°54′S 69°37′E. A small nunatak 20 nautical miles (37 km) northeast of Clemence Massif on the east side of Lambert Glacier. It was photographed by ANARE in 1950, and was sighted and mapped by the ANARE Prince Charles Mountains surveys of 1969 and 1971. It was named by ANCA for M.J.M. Robertson, a geophysicist at Mawson Station in 1970, who took part in the ANARE Prince Charles Mountains survey in 1971.

== Remote sensing ==
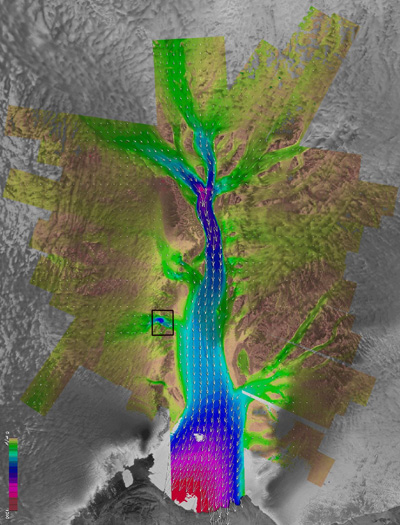
This NASA image showing glacier velocities on the Lambert Glacier has a box location of the area shown in the other photograph

The glacier is important in the study of climate change because very small changes in the climate can have significant consequences for the flow of ice down the glacier. Most studies of the Lambert Glacier are done with remote sensing due to the harsh conditions in the area.

The photo reproduced here (on the right) shows a small tributary right-flank glacier flowing down from the lofty, ice-covered East Antarctic Plateau, flanked by slower-moving ice flowing down over a steep escarpment. The icefall which so impressively illustrates the flow characteristics of glacier ice is only about 6 km wide, and the Lambert Glacier proper is off the bottom right corner of the photo. The ice here is flowing at about 500 m per year, but velocities of over 1200 m per year are known at the edge of the Amery Ice Shelf, which is fed by this gigantic stream of ice.

On the lower photo north is at the bottom, and the ice velocities are approximate as follow:

Brown areas—up to 50 m per year.
Green areas—up to 250 m per year.
Blue areas—up to 500 m per year.
Purple areas—around 1000 m per year.
Red area—up to 1200 m per year.

== See also ==
- Blake Nunataks
- Clemence Massif
- Ice stream
- List of glaciers in the Antarctic
- List of Antarctic ice streams

== Sources ==
- Alberts, Fred G., ed. (1995), Geographic Names of the Antarctic (PDF) (2 ed.), United States Board on Geographic Names This article incorporates public domain material from websites or documents of the United States Board on Geographic Names.
