= Ranvik Bay =

Bay in Antarctica

Location of Ranvik Bay
Princess Elizabeth Land, Antarctica

Ranvik Bay (69°0′S 77°40′E) is an open bay 15 nautical miles (28 km) wide, lying southward of Rauer Islands in the southeast part of Prydz Bay. Discovered and charted in February 1935 by a Norwegian expedition led by Captain Klarius Mikkelsen in the Thorshavn. Named after the estate of Lars Christensen, sponsor of the expedition, situated at the head of Ranvik, a bay in Norway.
