= Publications Ice Shelf =

Ice shelf in Antarctica

- Location within Antarctica
- Coordinates: 69°38′S 75°20′E
- Type: bay
- Part of: Prydz Bay
- Max. length: 46 kilometres (29 mi)
- Frozen: year-round

Publications Ice Shelf is an Antarctic ice shelf about 35 nautical miles (60 km) long on the south shore of Prydz Bay, between Mount Caroline Mikkelsen and Stornes Peninsula. Several glaciers, listed from southwest to northeast, nourish the ice shelf: Polar Times Glacier, Il Polo Glacier, Polarforschung Glacier, Polar Record Glacier and Polararboken Glacier. The feature was first mapped from air photos by the Lars Christensen Expedition, 1936–37. The name "Publication Glacier Tongues" was applied by John H. Roscoe in 1952 following his study of U.S. Navy Operation Highjump (1946–47) air photos of the area, but the term ice shelf is more descriptive. So named by Roscoe because the several glaciers in the area commemorate polar publications.
