= Amery Ice Shelf =

Ice shelf in Antarctica

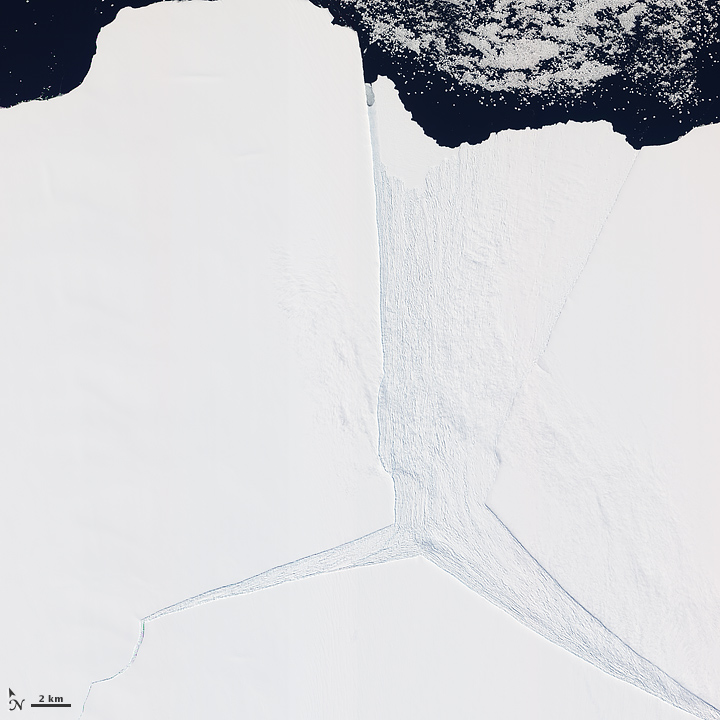
- Satellite image from early 2012 of a portion of the Amery Ice Shelf, where three giant rifts met. The "loose tooth" is to the right. The area to the left broke off the shelf in 2019 to form iceberg D-28.

- Location within Antarctica
- Location: Mac. Robertson Land
- Coordinates: 69°45′S 71°00′E

The Amery Ice Shelf (69°45′S 71°0′E) is a broad ice shelf in Antarctica at the head of Prydz Bay between the Lars Christensen Coast and Ingrid Christensen Coast. It is part of Mac. Robertson Land. The name "Cape Amery" was applied to a coastal angle mapped on 11 February 1931 by the British Australian New Zealand Antarctic Research Expedition (BANZARE) under Douglas Mawson. He named it for William Bankes Amery, a civil servant who represented the United Kingdom government in Australia (1925–28). The Advisory Committee on Antarctic Names interpreted this feature to be a portion of an ice shelf and, in 1947, applied the name Amery to the whole shelf.

In 2001 two holes were drilled through the ice shelf by scientists from the Australian Antarctic Division and specially designed seabed sampling and photographic equipment was lowered to the underlying seabed. By studying the fossil composition of sediment samples recovered, scientists have inferred that a major retreat of the Amery Ice Shelf to at least 80 km landward of its present location may have occurred during the mid-Holocene climatic optimum (about 5,700 years ago).

In December 2006, it was reported by the Australian Broadcasting Corporation that Australian scientists were heading to the Amery Ice Shelf to investigate enormous cracks that had been forming for over a decade at a rate of three to five metres a day. Scientists wanted to discover what was causing the cracks, as there has not been similar activity since the 1960s. However, the head of research stated that it is too early to attribute the cause to global warming as there is the possibility of a natural 50-60 year cycle being responsible.

Lambert Glacier flows from Lambert Graben into the Amery Ice Shelf on the southwest side of Prydz Bay.

The Amery Basin (68°15′S 74°30′E) is an undersea basin north of the Amery Ice Shelf.

The Chinese Antarctic Zhongshan Station and Russian Progress Station are located near this ice shelf.

The Amery Ice Shelf is the third largest ice shelf in Antarctica, after the Ross Ice Shelf and the Filchner-Ronne Ice Shelf.

== Calving ==
The D-28 iceberg breaking off

In September 2019, a large iceberg known as D-28 calved from the ice shelf. It was 1,636 square kilometres (632 sq mi) in size and with an estimated weight of 315 billion tonnes. As of October 2019, it continues to be monitored due to the threat it could pose to shipping channels. An adjacent ice formation, nicknamed the "loose tooth", was originally predicted to calve from the ice sheet between 2010 and 2015.

In February 2020, D-28 was lodged against the edge of the shelf, and slowly drifting northwards.

By May 2021, the iceberg had drifted 46 degrees west to the King Baudouin Ice Shelf, colliding with and destroying the Dog's Head Landing Site, an ice floe used for several years as a landing stage by the Belgian Antarctic Program.

== See also ==
- Twilight Bay
