= Ingrid Christensen Coast =

Coast in Princess Elizabeth Land, Antarctica

The Ingrid Christensen Coast is that portion of the coast of Antarctica lying between Jennings Promontory, in 72°33′E, and the western end of the West Ice Shelf in 81°24′E. It is located in the western half of Princess Elizabeth Land, just east of the Amery Ice Shelf.

== Exploration ==
The coast was discovered and a landing made on the Vestfold Hills on February 20, 1935, by Captain Klarius Mikkelsen in the Tórshavn, a vessel owned by Norwegian whaling magnate Lars Christensen. It was named for Ingrid Christensen, wife of Lars, who sailed in Antarctic waters with her husband, and was one of the first women to visit Antarctica. The southwestern portion of this coast was discovered and photographed from the air by U.S. Navy Operation Highjump in March 1947.
