= Prydz Bay =

Bay in Antarctica

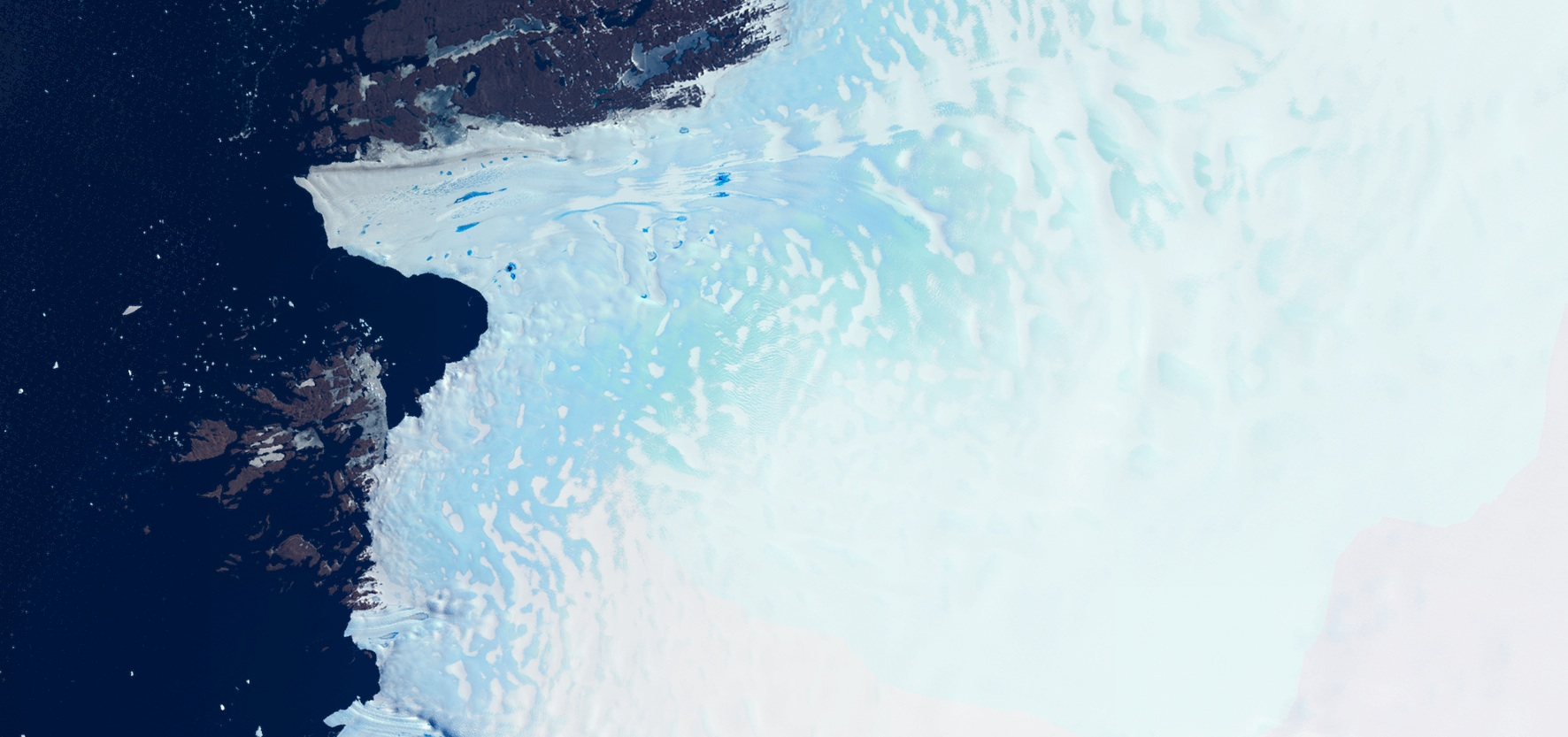
- Prydz Bay

- Location within Antarctica
- Location: Princess Elizabeth Land
- Coordinates: 69°0′S 75°0′E

Prydz Bay is a deep embayment of Antarctica between the Lars Christensen Coast and Ingrid Christensen Coast. The Bay is at the downstream end of a giant glacial drainage system that originates in the East Antarctic interior. The Lambert Glacier flows from Lambert Graben into the Amery Ice Shelf on the south-west side of Prydz Bay. Other major glaciers drain into the southern end of the Amery Ice Shelf at 73° S where the marine part of the system starts at the modern grounding zone.

The Amery Ice Shelf extends about 550 km north of the Lambert Glacier grounding zone and occupies a valley between 80 and 200 km wide. Depths to the bed beneath the Amery Ice Shelf are poorly known in detail but it is clearly over-deepened, reaching around -2500 m MSL close to the grounding zone. The Amery Ice Shelf occupies a very large U-shaped valley with exposed nunataks along the flanks reaching 1500 m in elevation and total relief as high as 3000 m.

Seaward of the Amery Ice Shelf, Prydz Bay shows bathymetry typical of glaciated margins with deeper water near the coast with a broad topographic basin, the Amery Depression that is around -700 m MSL along the front of the Amery Ice Shelf. The Amery Depression shoals gently to outer shelf banks around 100–200 m deep. The shelf break is at around 400–500 m. The western side of Prydz Bay features a broad trough crossing from the inner shelf to the shelf edge, Prydz Channel. It is around 100 km wide and is 500 m deep at the shelf break. It is a typical example of a cross-shelf glacial trough that occupy 40.2% of the area of the Antarctic continental shelf and that are formed by fast-flowing ice streams.

During the late Neogene, the Lambert Glacier–Amery Ice Shelf drainage system flowed across Prydz Bay in an ice stream that reached the shelf edge and built a trough mouth fan on the upper continental slope. The fan consists mostly of debris flow deposits derived from the melting out of subglacial debris at the grounding line at the continental shelf edge. Ocean Drilling Program Site 1167 indicates that thick debris flow intervals are separated by thin mudstone horizons deposited when the ice had retreated from the shelf edge. The bulk of the trough mouth fan was deposited prior to ~780,000 years ago with as few as three debris flow intervals deposited since then.

== History ==
Portions of the bay were sighted in January and February 1931 by Norwegian whalers and the British Australian New Zealand Antarctic Research Expedition (BANZARE). It was explored in February 1935 by Norwegian whaler Captain Klarius Mikkelsen in the ship Thorshavn, and was mapped in considerable detail from aerial photographs taken by the Lars Christensen Expedition of 1936–37. Named for Olaf Prydz, general manager of the Hvalfangernes Assuranceforening in Sandefjord, Norway.

== Research stations ==
Australia's Davis Station, Russian Progress, Romanian Law-Racoviță-Negoiță, Chinese Zhongshan Stations, and Indian Bharati station are located on Prydz Bay at the Larsemann Hills Oasis.
