= John H. Roscoe =

American military officer, geographer and aerospace engineer

- Born: John Hobart Roscoe; 23 March 1919; Syracuse, New York
- Died: February 23, 2007 (aged 87); Riverside, California
- Citizenship: American
- Education: Syracuse University Ph.D
- Scientific career
- Fields: Cartography, Geography, Aersospace Engineering
- Thesis: Contributions to the Study of Antarctic Surface Features by Photogeographical Methods (1952)

John Hobart Roscoe (March 23, 1919 - February 23, 2007) was an American geographer, intelligence officer and aerospace engineer. He is best known for his work with Operation Highjump and Operation Windmill, for which there was a glacier named after him.

== Early life ==
Roscoe was born in Syracuse, New York. His father owned a wholesale fruit business. He attended Flushing High School, before graduating in Business Administration from Syracuse University, then a master's degree in Geography before planning to pursue a Ph.D. in cartography at UCLA.

== Military service ==
After leaving university in 1941, and before he was able to begin studying cartography in at UCLA, he was convinced to join the Intelligence Office of the Army Air Corps, where he wrote the manual for aerial photo interpretation, and worked as an interpreter of aerial photographs before joining the Marine Corps as a Lieutenant and continued his interpretation work for the Naval Photo Intelligence School. His team were at one point responsible for interpreting success of bombing raids in Germany. After the war ended, he accepted an Associate Professor position at the University of Georgia, but after the first semester he was recalled to active duty to assist in Operation Highjump, a US Navy project to establish a research station in Antarctica, as the sole qualified photo interpreter. Roscoe was a member of the initial landing party, which discovered the previously set up base from 1939. The Navy and Marine Corps used Douglas R4D-8 aircraft for aerial photography.

On the way back from the expedition, Roscoe was named as the envoy to the Prime Minister of New Zealand by Admiral Byrd, and was given a tour of New Zealand. After the conclusion of Operation Highjump he left the Marine Corps and joined Navy Intelligence as a civilian. He returned to Antarctica to work on Operation Windmill, mapping points of which the exact latitude, longitude and, elevation were known and also interpreting aerial photos. In 1951 he published a Biography of Antarctica, then in the following year he earned a doctorate from the University of Maryland. He also contributed to the planning of Operation Deep Freeze and resigned from civil service around 1957. During his service in the Navy he worked very closely with Admiral Richard E. Byrd from the beginning of Operation Highjump to Byrd's death in 1957.

== Private life ==
Following his departure from Navy Intelligence, Roscoe was offered a position at the Lockheed Corporation, where he designed the photographic system for the first American satellite. He retired from Lockheed in 1982. Dr. Roscoe was awarded Fellowship to The Explorers Club in 1954. He served as the vice-president of the American Polar Society from 1957 to at least 2002. Roscoe also performed some research on the Knights Templar after retiring.
