= Antarctic field camps =

Research station offshoots

Many research stations in Antarctica support satellite field camps which are, in general, seasonal camps. The type of field camp can vary – some are permanent structures used during the annual Antarctic summer, whereas others are little more than tents used to support short term activities. Field camps are used for many things, from logistics (Sky Blu) to dedicated scientific research (WAIS Divide Field Camp).

== List of field camps ==
Field camp or Refuge name	Location	Country	Year est.	Activities	Type and Status	Serving base	Coordinates	Time zone
VII Brigada Aérea	Seymour Island	Argentina	1978		Summer refuge Closed	Marambio	64°14′25″S 56°37′17″W	
17 de Agosto	Millerand Island	Argentina	1957		Summer refuge Open	San Martín	68°08′15″S 67°08′17″W	
A
Abrazo de Maipú	Trinity Peninsula	Argentina; Chile	1967	Scientific activity	Summer refuge Closed 2010	Esperanza	63°23′17″S 57°34′58″W	
Academia	Livingston Island	Bulgaria	2004	Topographic survey	Summer camp Open	St. Kliment Ohridski	62°38′42″S 60°10′18″W	UTC−4
Ace Lake	Princess Elizabeth Land	Australia	2004	Research projects at Ace Lake	Summer refuge Open	Davis	68°28′31″S 78°11′23″E	
AGAP North; Field	Gamburtsev Mountain Range	Australia; United Kingdom	2006	AGAP Project	Summer camp		80°30′S 76°00′E	
AGAP South; Field	Gamburtsev Mountain Range	Germany; Japan; United States	2006	AGAP Project	Summer camp		80°30′S 76°00′E	
Albatros	King George Island	Argentina	n/a		Summer refuge	Carlini	62°15′09″S 58°39′24″W	
ALCI Airbase	Queen Maud Land	South Africa	2001	Airfield Camp	Summer camp Open	Maitri; Novolazarevskaya	70°49′17″S 11°38′36″E	
Amundsen	Amundsen Glacier	United States	1963		Summer camp Closed 1964		86°18′00″S 160°55′00″W	
Antonio Moro	Tabarin Peninsula	Argentina	1955		Summer refuge Open	Esperanza	63°25′14″S 56°59′47″W	
Arcondo	Arcondo Nunatak	Argentina	1963		Summer refuge Lost		66°09′00″S 61°43′00″W	
Asgard	Asgard Range	New Zealand	1969		Closed 1990; Removed		77°35′00″S 161°36′00″E	
B
Balduino Rambo	King George Island	Brazil	1985		Summer refuge Dismantled; 2004	Ferraz	62°05′43″S 58°34′31″W	
Ballvé	Ardley Island	Argentina	1953	Paleomagnetism	Summer refuge Open		62°12′36″S 58°56′03″W	UTC-3
Bandits	Tryne Fjord	Australia	1983	Seal research	Summer refuge Open	Davis	68°25′18″S 78°23′04″E	
Beacon Valley	Beacon Valley	United States	2004	Project oldest Ice	Summer camp		77°51′32″S 160°34′26″E	
Beardmore South	Beardmore Glacier	United States	1984	Helicopter support	Summer camp		84°00′00″S 160°30′00″E	
Beaver Lake	Beaver Lake	Australia	1995		Summer camp Open		70°47′42″S 68°10′08″E	
Béchervaise Island	Bechervaise Island	Australia	n/a	Penguin research	Summer refuge Open	Mawson	67°35′13″S 62°48′30″E	UTC+6
Betbeder	Snow Hill Island	Argentina	1954		Summer refuge		64°21′31″S 56°56′24″W	
Black Island	Black Island	United States	n/a		Summer refuge Open		78°09′01″S 166°06′15″E	
Blaicklock Island (BL)	Blaiklock Island	United Kingdom	1957	Survey; Geology	Summer refuge Closed 1958; Historic Site No.63	Station Y Station W	67°32′43″S 67°11′36″W	
Borchgrevink's Hut	Cape Adare	Norway	1899		Abandoned; ASPA #159		71°18′04″S 170°12′05″E	UTC+12
Boulder	Sansom Islands	Australia			Depot		68°36′19″S 78°28′49″E	
Bratina Island	Bratina Island	New Zealand	n/a		Summer refuge Open		78°03′12″S 165°28′28″E	
Brookes	Shirokaya Bay	Australia	1972	Depot for seal and lake research	Summer refuge Open	Davis	68°36′06″S 78°11′05″E	UTC+7
Browning Pass	Browning Pass	Italy	1997	Airfield Camp; Fuel depot	Summer camp Open	Zucchelli	74°37′21″S 163°54′58″E	UTC+12
Browning Peninsula	Browning Peninsula	Australia	n/a	Support field personnel	Summer refuge Open	Casey	66°28′10″S 110°33′01″E	UTC+11
Brownworth	Lake Brownworth	New Zealand	1969		Closed 1985; Removed		77°27′00″S 162°53′00″E	
Bull Pass	Bull Pass	New Zealand	1969		Summer hut Closed 2003		77°31′00″S 161°50′00″E	
Bull Pass	Bull Pass	United States	n/a		Summer refuge Open		77°31′01″S 161°50′52″E	
Bryde	Bryde Island	Argentina	1953		Summer refuge	Brown	64°53′00″S 62°56′00″W	
Byers	Livingston Island	Spain	2001		Summer refuge Open	Juan Carlos I	62°39′49″S 61°05′58″W	UTC−4
Byrd Aurora	Marie Byrd Land	United States	1963		Summer camp Closed 1963		79°26′00″S 118°04′00″W	
Byrd Coast	Mount Farley	United States	1966		Summer camp Closed 1967		76°55′00″S 144°00′00″W	
Byrd Surface	Marie Byrd Land	United States	2001		Temporary closed		80°00′53″S 119°33′56″W	
C
Cabral	Pitt Point	Argentina	1964		Summer refuge Closed	Esperanza	63°50′45″S 58°22′34″W	
Caleta Péndulo	Port Foster	Argentina	1947		Abandoned 1967		62°55′42″S 60°36′30″W	
Caleta Telefon	Deception Island	Chile	1955	Emergency refuge	Abandoned; 1967		62°56′00″S 60°42′00″W	
Campbell	Campbell Glacier	Italy	n/a	Fuel depot	Summer; Open	Zucchelli	74°11′46″S 163°52′52″E	UTC+12
Cape Bird	Cape Bird	New Zealand	1965		Summer refuge Open	Scott	77°13′05″S 166°26′09″E	
Cape Chocolate	Cape Chocolate	New Zealand	n/a		Summer hut Closed		77°56′00″S 164°30′00″E	
Cape Crozier	Cape Crozier	United States	n/a		Summer refuge Open		77°27′39″S 169°11′14″E	
Cape Denison	Cape Denison	Australia	n/a	Maintenance to Mawson's Huts	Summer refuge Open	Mawson's Huts	67°00′31″S 142°39′41″E	
Cape Evans	Cape Evans	New Zealand	n/a		Summer refuge Open		77°38′18″S 166°24′25″E	
Cape Hallett	Cape Hallett	Italy	n/a	Fuel depot	Summer; Open	Zucchelli	72°25′50″S 169°56′43″E	UTC+12
Cape Phillips	Cape Phillips	Italy	n/a	Fuel depot	Summer; Open	Zucchelli	73°03′38″S 169°37′50″E	UTC+12
Cape Reclus (CR)	Portal Point	United Kingdom	1956	Survey; Geology	Summer refuge Closed 1958; Dismantled 1996; Rebuilt inside Falkland Islands Museum in 2014	Station O	64°30′00″S 61°46′00″W	
Cape Roberts	Cape Roberts	New Zealand	1984		Summer refuge Open		77°02′05″S 163°11′03″E	
Cape Roberts	Cape Roberts	United States	1997	Cape Roberts Project	Summer refuge Open	McMurdo; Scott	77°02′00″S 163°10′45″E	
Cape Ross	Cape Ross	Italy	n/a	Fuel depot	Summer; Open	Zucchelli	76°44′01″S 162°58′03″E	UTC+12
Cape Royds	Cape Royds	New Zealand	1993		Summer refuge Open		77°33′13″S 166°09′45″E	
Cape Royds	Cape Royds	United States	n/a		Summer refuge Open		77°33′16″S 166°09′50″E	
Capitán Caillet-Bois	D'Hainaut Island	Argentina	1954		Summer refuge Occasionally used		63°54′33″S 60°48′21″W	
Capitán Cobbett	Cierva Cove	Argentina	1954	Meteorology; Biology	Summer refuge Open	Primavera	64°09′21″S 60°57′19″W	
Capitán Estivariz	Watkins Island	Argentina	1956		Summer refuge Open	Brown	66°23′00″S 67°13′00″W	
Capitán Fliess	Neko Harbour	Argentina	1949		Summer refuge Rebuilt 2011		64°50′41″S 62°31′48″W	
Castle Rock	Castle Rock	United States	n/a	Emergency hut	Summer hut Open	McMurdo Station	77°49′31″S 166°42′22″E	
Chacabuco	Fallières Coast	Argentina	1956		Summer refuge Open	San Martín	68°06′00″S 66°31′00″W	
Colbeck Hut	Colbeck Archipelago	Australia	1988	Monitor the Taylor Glacier emperor penguin	Summer hut Open	Mawson	67°27′37″S 60°58′50″E	UTC+6
Comandante Zapiola	Filchner-Ronne Ice Shelf	Argentina	1976		Summer refuge Open	Belgrano II	77°51′S 34°33′W	
Commonwealth Glacier	Commonwealth Glacier	New Zealand	1975		Summer camp Closed 1977; Demolished		77°35′00″S 163°19′00″E	
Corrientes	Brunt Ice Shelf	Argentina	1961		Summer refuge Closed	Belgrano II	75°34′00″S 26°36′00″W	
Cosmonaut	Cosmonaut Glacier	Italy	n/a	Fuel depot	Summer; Open	Zucchelli	73°24′02″S 164°41′21″E	UTC+12
Cristo Redentor	Duse Bay	Argentina	1955		Summer refuge Open	Esperanza	63°33′08″S 57°22′43″W	
Crooked Lake	Crooked Lake	Australia	n/a	Support field personnel	Summer refuge Open	Davis	68°37′32″S 78°22′57″E	UTC+7
Cruls	Nelson Island	Brazil	1985		Summer refuge Open	Ferraz	62°14′34″S 58°58′51″W	
CTAM	Transantarctic Mountains	United States	2010	Depot	Summer camp Temporary closed		83°59′45″S 164°25′01″E	
D
D10 Skiway	Cape Géodésie	France	n/a	Airfield Camp	Summer camp Open	Dumont d'Urville Station	66°42′03″S 139°49′31″E	
D59 Skiway	East Antarctic Ice Sheet	France	n/a	Airfield Camp	Summer camp Closed		69°37′S 135°22′E	
D85 Skiway	East Antarctic Ice Sheet	France	n/a	Airfield Camp	Summer camp Open		70°25′12″S 134°09′00″E	
Damoy Point (DP)	Damoy Point	United Kingdom	1975	Transit Facility	Summer refuge Closed 2006; Historic Site No.84	Rothera	64°49′04″S 63°30′15″W	
Darwin Glacier	Darwin Glacier		n/a				79°55′20″S 159°06′10″E	
Discovery Hut	Hut Point Peninsula; Ross Island	United Kingdom	1902	Discovery Expedition	Abandoned; 1917; ASPA #158	n/a	77°50′45″S 166°38′30″E	
Dome C	Antarctic ice sheet	United States	1981		Summer camp inactive since 1984		74°39′00″S 124°10′00″W	
Dorian Bay	Dorian Bay	Argentina	1957	Survey	Summer refuge Open refurbished 2011		64°49′04″S 63°30′15″W	
Downstream Bravo Camp				Fuel depot	Abandoned		84°1′S 155°0′W	
E
E-Base	Fimbul Ice Shelf	South Africa	1995	Emergency refuge Accommodation	Closed; Abandoned	SANAE III	70°18′00″S 2°26′00″W	
Echo Base	Henriksen Nunataks	United Kingdom	2022	Private Base Camp	Summer camp Open		71°32′47″S 8°50′11″E	
Edgeworth David	Bunger Hills	Australia	1986	Geology; Geophysics; Geomorphology	Summer refuge Open	Casey	66°14′59″S 100°36′12″E	UTC+8
El Manco	Seymour Island	Argentina	2007		Summer refuge		64°13′35″S 56°39′32″W	
El Plumerillo	Rymill Bay	Argentina	1953		Summer refuge Closed	San Martín	68°20′00″S 67°10′00″W	
Elefante	King George Island	Argentina	n/a		Summer refuge	Carlini	62°15′18″S 58°37′56″W	
Enigma Lake	Victoria Land	Italy	2005	Airfield Camp	Summer camp Open	Zucchelli	74°43′08″S 164°01′46″E	UTC+12
Ensenada Martel	Admiralty Bay	Argentina	1947		Summer refuge Abandoned		62°06′00″S 58°28′00″W	
F
F6 Camp	Victoria Land	United States	2001		Summer camp Open		77°36′30″S 163°15′20″E	
Fang Hut	David Range	Australia	1982	Geology	Summer hut Open	Mawson	67°47′41″S 62°35′04″E	UTC+6
Filla	Filla Island	Australia	1999	Support field personnel	Summer refuge Open		68°48′29″S 77°51′23″E	
Florentino Ameghino	Cape Longing	Argentina	1960		Summer; Closed	Esperanza	64°26′14″S 58°58′31″W	
Fossil Bluff	Alexander Island	United Kingdom	1961	Airfield Camp; Fuel depot	Summer; Open		71°20′00″S 68°17′00″W	
Framheim	Bay of Whales; Ross Ice Shelf	Norway	1911	Amundsen's South Pole expedition	Abandoned; 1912		78°30′00″S 164°00′00″W	
Francisco de Gurruchaga	Nelson Island	Argentina	1954		Summer refuge Open		62°16′08″S 59°11′04″W	
G
General San Martín	Persson Island	Argentina	1955		Summer refuge Open	Esperanza	64°11′22″S 58°23′02″W	
Goeldi	Elephant Island	Brazil	1988		Summer refuge Open	Ferraz	61°03′S 55°12′W	
Gould	Heritage Range	United States	1966		Closed 1967	Summer camp	78°57′00″S 85°45′00″W	
Gould Bay	Gould Bay	United States	n/a	Private Base Camp	Summer camp Open		77°44′05″S 47°32′05″W	
Granaderos	Hayrick Island	Argentina	1957		Summer refuge	San Martín	68°42′24″S 67°30′40″W	
Groussac	Petermann Island	Argentina	1955		Summer refuge Open	Esperanza	65°10′33″S 64°08′10″W	
Guaraní	Cape Sobral	Argentina	1959		Summer refuge Lost		64°30′40″S 59°37′35″W	
Guillochon	Rabot Island	Argentina	1957		Summer refuge Closed		65°54′40″S 65°54′20″W	
Gutiérrez Vargas	Deception Island	Chile	1956	Emergency refuge	Summer; Abandoned; 1967		62°57′00″S 60°36′00″W	
H
Harrow Peaks	Harrow Peaks	Italy	n/a	Fuel depot	Summer; Open	Zucchelli	74°06′11″S 164°46′16″E	UTC+12
Herb	Herbertson Glacier	New Zealand	n/a		Summer camp Closed		77°42′S 163°48′E	
Hop	Hop Island	Australia	1990	Support field personnel	Summer refuge Open		68°49′16″S 77°41′56″E	
Huneeus	Patriot Hills	Chile	1997	Support field personnel	Summer refuge Closed 2013		80°18′08″S 81°20′52″W	
I
Icaro	Terra Nova Bay	Italy	n/a	Meteo station Emergency refuge	Summer camp Open	Zucchelli Station	74°42′43″S 164°07′00″E	UTC+12
Independencia Argentina	Trinity Peninsula	Argentina	1967		Summer refuge Open	Esperanza	63°27′00″S 57°10′00″W	
J
Jack's Donga	David Range	Australia	1982	Geology	Summer refuge Open	Mawson	66°13′42″S 110°39′12″E	UTC+6
Jorge Boonen (ex Cañas Montalva) (ex Station V)	View Point	Chile United Kingdom	1996 1953	Meteorology; Geology	Summer refuge Open	Esperanza	63°33′16″S 57°22′42″W	
K
Kottas	Heimefront Range	East Germany; Germany	1985	Geophysical; Geology	Summer camp	Neumayer III; Kohnen	74°12′18″S 9°44′48″W	
Kurzmann	Trinity Peninsula	Argentina	1976		Summer refuge Destroyed		63°25′00″S 57°06′00″W	
L
Lake Bonney	Lake Bonney	United States	2001		Summer refuge Open		77°42′53″S 162°27′01″E	
Lake Fryxell	Lake Fryxell	United States	2001		Summer refuge Open		77°36′21″S 163°07′32″E	
Lake Hoare	Lake Hoare	United States	2001		Summer refuge Open		77°37′23″S 162°54′02″E	
Lake Miers	Lake Miers	New Zealand	1979		Summer refuge Closed 1996		78°08′00″S 163°50′00″E	
Lake Vanda	Lake Vanda	New Zealand	n/a		Summer refuge Open		77°31′20″S 161°41′00″E	
Lake Vida	Lake Vida	United States	n/a	Depot	Summer refuge Open		77°22′41″S 161°54′13″E	
Lasala	Whalers Bay	Argentina	1953		Summer refuge Destroyed by the British in the Deception Island incident in April 1953		62°55′59″S 60°35′50″W	
Ledingham	Ledingham Depot	Australia	1984	Support science programs	Summer refuge Open		67°22′00″S 59°27′09″E	
Lichen Hills	Lichen Hills	Italy	n/a	Fuel depot	Summer; Open	Zucchelli	73°18′19″S 162°06′06″E	UTC+12
Lillie Marleen	Everett Range	Germany	1979	Emergency; Refuge	Summer refuge Open		71°12′24″S 164°30′43″E	
Little Dome C	East Antarctic Plateau	France; Italy	2016	Beyond EPICA	Summer camp Open	Concordia Station	75°17′57″S 122°26′43″E	
Little Rockford		United States	1958		Summer camp Closed 1965		79°30′00″S 147°19′00″W	
Livingston	Livingston Island	Argentina	1995		Summer refuge Open		62°39′22″S 61°0′39″W	UTC−4
Lower Erebus	Ross Island	United States	1992	Monitoring; Mt. Erebus	Summer refuge Open	McMurdo	77°30′41″S 167°08′34″E	UTC+12
Lower Wright	Wright Lower Glacier	New Zealand	1971		Summer refuge Open		77°26′00″S 162°03′00″E	
Lower Wright	Wright Lower Glacier	United States	n/a		Summer refuge Open		77°26′34″S 162°38′54″E	
M
Macey	Robinson Group	Australia	1971	Auster emperor penguin colony	Summer hut Open	Mawson	67°26′21″S 63°43′09″E	UTC+6
Maipú	Larsen Ice Shelf	Argentina	1956		Summer refuge Closed	San Martín	68°06′00″S 65°58′00″W	
Marble Point	McMurdo Dry Valleys	United States	n/a	Fuel Depot; Logistic base for helicopters	Summer refuge Open	McMurdo	77°24′51″S 163°41′04″E	
Marie Byrd	Marie Byrd Land	United States	1957		Summer camp		75°45′00″S 135°00′00″W	
Marine Plain	Vestfold Hills	Australia	n/a	Support field personnel working in the protected site ASPA 143	Summer camp Open	Mawson	68°36′09″S 78°06′05″E	UTC+6
Mariner Camp		Italy	n/a	Fuel depot	Summer	Zucchelli	73°29′47″S 167°01′38″E	UTC+12
Martín Güemes I	Duse Bay	Argentina	1953		Summer refuge Covered by ice in 1960	Esperanza	63°29′00″S 57°00′00″W	
Martín Güemes II	Duse Bay	Argentina	1959		Summer refuge Open	Esperanza	63°30′14″S 57°07′25″W	
McGregor	McGregor Glacier	United States	1982		Summer hut		85°08′00″S 170°50′00″W	
Megadunes	Antarctic Plateau	United States	2003	Support scientists	Summer camp		80°30′00″S 125°00′00″E	
Mesa Range	Mesa Range	Italy	n/a	Fuel depot	Summer	Zucchelli	73°28′58″S 162°46′06″E	UTC+12
Meteorite Hills	Meteorite Hills	United States	Since 1976	ANSMET Project	Summer camp		79°38′00″S 155°41′00″E	
Mid Point	East Antarctic Ice Sheet	Italy	1988	Airfield Camp; Depot	Summer camp Open	Zucchelli; Concordia	75°32′28″S 145°49′18″E	UTC+12
Minnesota	Jones Mountains	United States	1961		Summer camp Closed 1965		73°30′00″S 94°30′00″W	
Moody Nunatak		United States	2003	Logistical helicopter	Summer camp		83°07′00″S 159°30′00″E	
Morris Basin	Morris Basin	Italy	n/a	Fuel depot	Summer	Zucchelli	75°38′15″S 159°04′09″E	UTC+12
Mount Henderson Hut	Mount Henderson	Australia	n/a	Shelter for visitors	Summer hut Open	Mawson	67°42′03″S 63°03′23″E	UTC+6
Mount Jackman	Mount Jackman	Italy	n/a	Fuel depot	Summer	Zucchelli	72°23′06″S 163°10′47″E	UTC+12
Mount Minto	Admiralty Mountains	Italy	n/a	Fuel depot	Summer	Zucchelli	71°36′41″S 167°55′34″E	UTC+12
N
Neptune	Pensacola Mountains	United States	1963	Paleobotany; Entomology; Geodesy	Summer refuge Closed 1966		83°31′00″S 57°15′00″W	
New Harbour	New Harbour	United States	n/a		Summer refuge Open		77°34′40″S 163°31′13″E	
Nogal de Saldán	Cape Jeremy	Argentina	1958		Summer refuge Closed		(69°24′04″S 68°49′20″W)	
Nuestra Señora de Luján	Danco Coast	Argentina	1979		Summer Refuge		64°09′21″S 60°57′18″W	
O
Ocean Camp	Weddell Sea Ice Shelf	United Kingdom	1915	Imperial Trans-Antarctic Expedition	Abandoned; 1915			
Odell Glacier	Odell Glacier	United States	2001		Summer camp		76°39′00″S 159°58′00″E	
Ohio	Horlick Mountains	United States	1961		Summer camp Closed 1967		84°52′00″S 114°20′00″W	
Ohio H		United States	1962		Summer camp Closed 1965		86°00′00″S 127°00′00″W	
Omgi	Horseshoe Island	Turkey	2019	Meteorology; Scientific activity	Summer camp		67°49′48″S 67°14′17″W	
Ona	Fallières Coast	Argentina	1995		Summer refuge	San Martín	68°06′02″S 67°01′30″W	
Onset D		United States	2001		Summer camp		80°45′39″S 125°47′36″W	
Orford Cliff (OC)	Orford Cliff	United Kingdom	1957	Survey; Geology	Summer refuge Closed 1959; Demolished 1997	Station W	66°54′37″S 66°29′18″W	
Ortiz	Paradise Harbor	Argentina	1956		Summer refuge Open	Brown	64°53′43″S 62°51′57″W	
P
Paso de los Andes	Avian Island	Argentina	1957		Summer refuge Open	San Martín	67°46′00″S 68°54′00″W	
Paso del Medio	Hope Bay	Argentina	1990		Summer refuge		63°25′00″S 57°05′00″W	
Patience Camp	Weddell Sea Ice Shelf	United Kingdom	1915	Imperial Trans-Antarctic Expedition	Abandoned; 1916			
Patriot Hills	Ellsworth Mountains	United States	1987	Private camp and Blue ice runway	Summer camp Open	Various	80°19′0″S 81°16′0″W	UTC−5
Patuxent	Patuxent Range	United States	1962		Summer camp Closed 1965		84°54′00″S 63°00′00″W	
Peggotty Bluff	Peggotty Bluff; South Georgia	United Kingdom	1916	Imperial Trans-Antarctic Expedition	Abandoned	n/a	54°9′0″S 37°17′0″W	UTC−2
Peterson Island	Peterson Island	Australia	n/a	Shelter for visitors	Summer refuge Open	Casey	66°28′00″S 110°30′00″E	
Pine Island Glacier	Pine Island Glacier	United States	n/a	Ice stream survey	Summer refuge Open		75°48′13″S 100°16′38″W	
Platcha	Princess Elizabeth Land	Australia	1961	Base for field training	Summer refuge Open	Davis	68°30′42″S 78°30′44″E	
Polheim	South Pole	Norway	1911	Amundsen's South Pole expedition	Abandoned	n/a	90°S 0°E	
Prebble Glacier	Prebble Glacier	United States	1966	Camp	Closed 1967		84°15′00″S 164°10′00″E	
Puerto Moro	Hope Bay	Argentina	1951		Summer	Integrated into Esperanza	63°24′02″S 56°59′53″W	
R
Rada Lote	Danco Coast	Argentina	1953		Summer refuge Destroyed by a storm		64°39′00″S 62°34′00″W	
Rasmussen Island (RS)	Rasmussen Island	United Kingdom	1985	Emergency refuge Recreational shelter	Summer refuge Closed 1996; Occasionally used		65°14′45″S 64°05′08″W	
Reedy Glacier	Reedy Glacier	United States	2001		Summer camp		85°30′S 134°00′W	
Robert Guillard	Adélie Land	France; Italy	1994	Logistic camp to Concordia	Summer refuge Open	Dumont d'Urville	66°41′28″S 139°53′44″E	
Robinson Ridge	Robinson Ridge	Australia	1998	Support field personnel	Summer refuge Open		68°49′16″S 77°41′56″E	
Rookery Lake	Vestfold Hills	Australia	n/a	Support monitoring programs on Adelie penguins	Summer refuge Open		68°29′56″S 78°04′05″E	
Roosevelt Island	Roosevelt Island	United States	1969		Summer hut		80°11′00″S 161°39′00″W	
Roque C. Cisterna	Luitpold Coast	Argentina	1976		Summer refuge Open		77°52′00″S 34°19′00″W	
Rumdoodle	Rumdoodle Peak	Australia	n/a	Ski Landing Area	Summer refuge Open	Mawson	67°46′08″S 62°49′01″E	
S
S2 Camp	Law Dome	United States	1952	Measure the movement of ice below the surface	Summer refuge Closed 1966	Casey	66°30′07″S 113°12′09″E	
S17 Camp	Enderby Land	Japan	n/a		Summer refuge Open	Showa	69°01′57″S 40°03′55″E	UTC+3
Sally Rocks	South Bay	Bulgaria	2005		Summer refuge Open	St. Kliment Ohridski	62°42′08″S 60°25′07″W	
Salta	Filchner-Ronne Ice Shelf	Argentina	1957		Summer refuge Closed 1975	Belgrano II	78°01′00″S 35°48′00″W	
Salyut	Queen Mary Land	Soviet Union	1978		Summer base Closed 1978		65°32′00″S 96°30′00″E	
San Antonio	Larsen Nunatak	Argentina	1959		Summer refuge Open	Integrated in Matienzo	64°58′00″S 60°04′00″W	
SANAP Summer Base	Queen Maud Land	South Africa	2009	Logistics	Summer; Open	SANAE IV	70°38′24″S 8°15′43″W	
San Carlos	Brandy Bay	Argentina	1959		Summer refuge Open	Esperanza	63°49′00″S 57°59′00″W	
San Juan	Hidden Lake	Argentina	1959		Summer refuge Lost	Esperanza	64°02′01″S 58°18′06″W	
San Nicolás	Trinity Peninsula	Argentina	1963		Summer refuge Closed	Esperanza	63°39′00″S 57°50′00″W	
San Roque	Robertson Island	Argentina	1956		Summer refuge Closed	Esperanza	65°14′40″S 59°26′38″W	
Sansom	Sansom Islands	Australia			Depot		69°42′37″S 73°44′45″E	
Santa Bárbara	Filchner-Ronne Ice Shelf	Argentina	1963		Summer refuge Lost		79°58′00″S 37°48′00″W	
Santa Teresita	Oscar II Coast	Argentina	1953		Summer refuge Closed		66°22′00″S 62°55′00″W	
Scott's Hut	Ross Island	United Kingdom	1911	Terra Nova Expedition, Imperial Trans-Antarctic Expedition	Abandoned; 1917; ASPA #155	n/a	77°38′0″S 166°24′0″E	UTC+12
Scullin monolith	Scullin monolith	Australia	1988	Depot in support of field programs in ASPA 164	Summer refuge Open	Mawson	67°47′13″S 66°41′36″E	
Shackleton Camp	Transantarctic Mountains	United States	2015		Summer camp Open		85°05′24″S 175°19′48″W	
Shackleton's Hut	Cape Royds; Ross Island	United Kingdom	1908	Nimrod Expedition	Abandoned; ASPA #157	n/a	77°33′S 166°10′E	UTC+12
Siple Dome	Marie Byrd Land	United States	1996	Logistic	Summer camp	McMurdo; Amundsen–Scott South Pole	81°39′15″S 149°00′18″W	
Sitry (C-3)	Antarctic Plateau	Italy	2000	Airfield Camp; Fuel depot	Summer camp Closed		71°39′06″S 148°39′17″E	
Sky Blu	Ellsworth Land	United Kingdom	1993	Logistics Facility	Summer camp Open	Rothera	74°51′23″S 71°35′07″W	UTC−5
South Ice	Edith Ronne Land	United Kingdom	1957	IGY overwinter	Abandoned	n/a	82°05′S 30°00′W	UTC−2
Starr Nunatak	Starr Nunatak	Italy	n/a	Fuel depot	Summer	Zucchelli	75°54′01″S 162°33′47″E	UTC+12
Station P	Mateev Cove	United Kingdom	1957		Summer camp Abandoned		62°38′58″S 60°35′25″W	
T
Talos Dome	Talos Dome	Italy	2004	TALDICE Project	Summer camp Removed 2008	Zucchelli	72°49′40″S 159°11′00″E	UTC+12
Tam Flat	Victoria Land	Italy	n/a	Fuel depot	Summer	Zucchelli	75°00′37″S 162°38′02″E	UTC+12
Tamseis	Wilkes Land	United States	2001	Trans-Antarctic Mountains Seismic Experiment	Summer camp		81°39′08″S 122°35′16″E	
Thorne	Port Foster	Argentina	1953		Summer refuge Destroyed in 1969 due to volcanic eruption		62°56′00″S 60°42′00″W	
Trajer Ridge	Trajer Ridge	Australia	1988	Emergency refuge and due to be replaced	Summer refuge Open	Davis	68°33′39″S 78°30′00″E	
Tucker Glacier	Tucker Glacier	Italy	n/a	Fuel depot	Summer	Zucchelli	72°26′51″S 168°31′04″E	UTC+12
Turkish Camp	Horseshoe Island	Turkey	2019	Scientific activity	Summer camp Open		67°49′48″S 67°14′10″W	
U
Union Glacier	Ellsworth Land	United States	n/a	Private Camp	Summer camp Open		79°46′05″S 83°15′42″W	UTC-3
V
Valleverdú	Seymour Island	Argentina	2008		Boats Refuge	Carlini	64°15′23″S 56°44′22″W	
Vargas	Deception Island	Chile	1956	Refuge	Abandoned 1967	Aguirre Cerda	62°57′00″S 60°36′00″W	
Vinson	Branscomb Glacier	United States	n/a	Private Base Camp	Summer camp Open		78°32′05″S 86°00′24″W	
Virgen de las Nieves	Filchner-Ronne Ice Shelf	Argentina	1958		Summer refuge Closed	Belgrano II	79°10′00″S 38°53′00″W	
Virgen de Loreto	Larsen Ice Shelf	Argentina	1963		Summer refuge Lost		65°33′S 61°30′W	
W
WAIS Divide	WAIS Divide	United States	2005	Collect deep ice core	Summer camp Open	McMurdo	79°28′03″S 112°05′11″W	
Watts Lake	Ellis Fjord	Australia	n/a	Support of biological programs	Summer refuge Open	Davis	68°36′10″S 78°13′29″E	
Whichaway	Schirmacher Oasis	United States	n/a	Private camp	Summer camp Open		70°45′51″S 11°37′01″E	
Wilkes 'Hilton'	Clark Peninsula	Australia	1962	Support field personnel	Summer refuge Open	Casey	66°15′24″S 110°31′25″E	
Wilkins Runway	Wilkes Land	Australia	n/a	Airfield Camp	Summer camp Open	Casey	66°41′27″S 111°31′28″E	UTC+8
Wiltgen	Elephant Island	Brazil	1985		Summer refuge Dismantled; 1998	Ferraz	61°01′S 55°13′W	
Whoop Whoop		Australia		Ski Landing Area	Summer hut	Davis	68°28′11″S 73°44′45″E	
Y
Yapeyú	Fallières Coast	Argentina	1956		Summer refuge Open	San Martín	68°05′00″S 66°41′00″W	

== See also ==
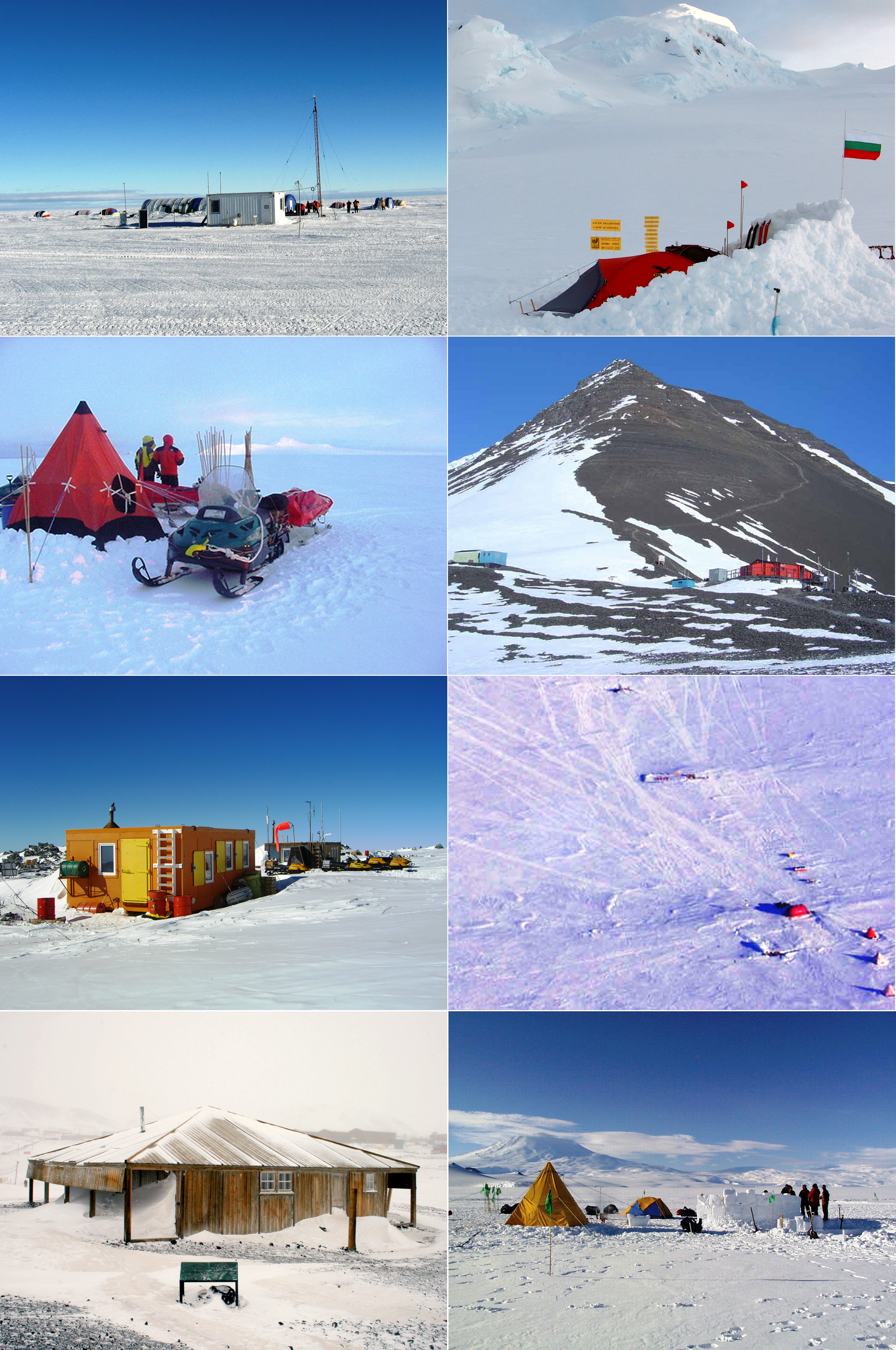
Antarctic field camps. Clockwise: Patriot Hills, Academia, Fossil Bluff, Sky Blu, Erebus, Scott's Hut, Lower Erebus, Casanovas.

- Research stations in Antarctica
- Demographics of Antarctica
- List of Antarctic expeditions
- Transport in Antarctica
