= Caro Island =

Island of Antarctica

- Location within Antarctica

Geography
- Location: Antarctica
- Coordinates: 68°51′32″S 77°42′11″E
- Archipelago: Rauer Islands
- Area: 0.57 km^{2} (0.22 sq mi)

Administration
- Administered under the Antarctic Treaty System

Demographics
- Population: Uninhabited

Caro Island is a 57 ha island in the Rauer archipelago of Princess Elizabeth Land, Antarctica. The nearest permanent station is Australia's Davis Station, some 33 km to the north. The island has been designated an Important Bird Area (IBA) by BirdLife International because it supports a colony of about 35,000 breeding pairs of Adélie penguins (estimated from 2011 satellite imagery).
