= Dorian Bay =

Cove and refuge in the Palmer Archipelago of Antarctica

Bahia Dorian Refuge
- Refuge
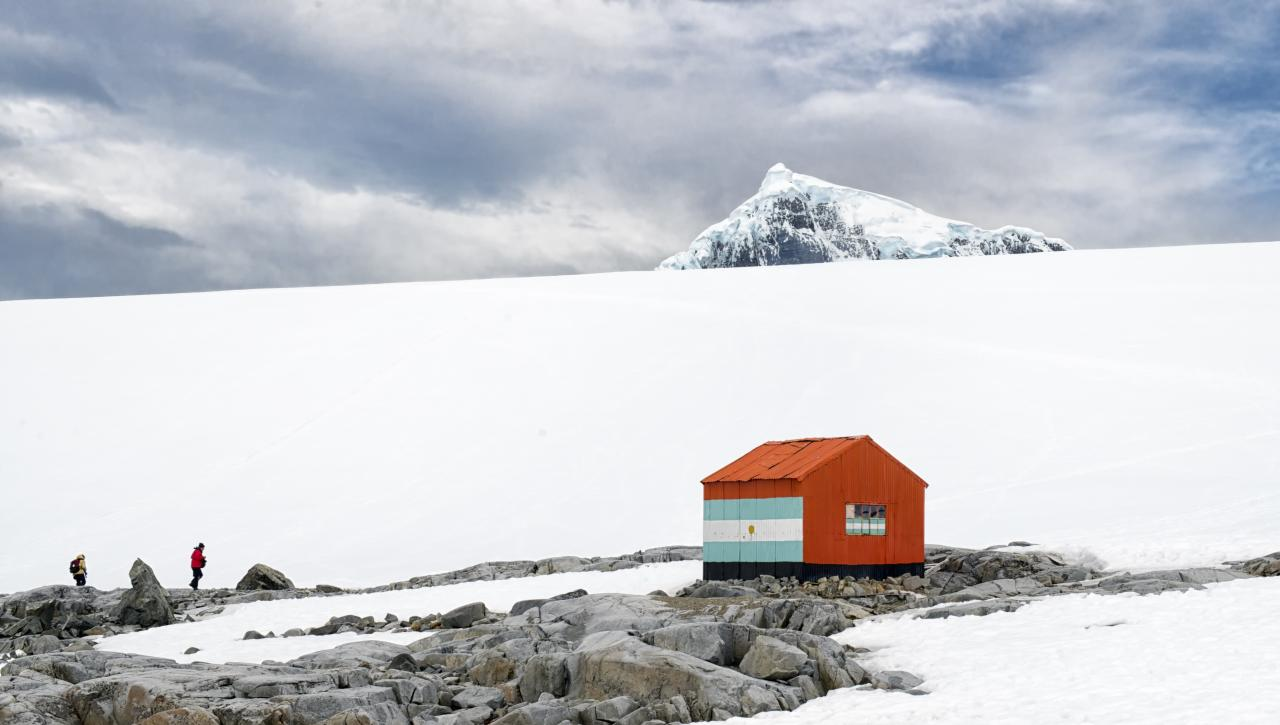
- Bahia Dorian Refuge

- Location of Dorian Bay in Antarctic Peninsula
- Coordinates: 64°49′04″S 63°30′15″W
- Country: Argentina
- Location in Antarctica: Dorian Bay; Wiencke Island; Antarctica
- Administered by: Argentine Antarctica
- Established: 1957
- Type: Seasonal
- Status: Operational

Dorian Bay (64°49′S 63°30′W) is a cove on the northwest side of Wiencke Island, 0.5 nautical miles (1 km) east-northeast of Damoy Point, in the Palmer Archipelago of Antarctica. It was discovered by the French Antarctic Expedition, 1903–05, under Jean-Baptiste Charcot, and named by him after Monsieur Dorian, a member of the French Chamber of Deputies.

== Bahia Dorian Refuge and Damoy Hut ==
Two structures were erected on the shores of Dorian Bay; the Argentine Refugio Bahia Dorian in 1957, and a larger building known as the Damoy Hut in 1975, where it served flights to and from a summer-use ice-strip for aircraft used before the sea-ice cleared near Rothera Base. The Damoy hut and ice-strip were closed in 1995: the building is now listed as an Historic Site and Monument and is maintained and administered by the United Kingdom Antarctic Heritage Trust.

== 1990 wintering ==
Starting in 1990, Amyr Klink spent 13 months in Dorian Bay with the ship Paratii. The wintering is the theme of his book Between Two Poles. Amyr Klink’s daughter, Tamara, in the book "Good Morning, Winter", refers to that voyage. She says: "I had not been born yet when my father wintered alone in Antarctica. In 1989, he set out on his red sailboat from Paraty Bay toward the southernmost parts of the world. When he reached Dorian Bay, on the west coast of the Antarctic Peninsula, he anchored the yacht Paratii and waited for the sea to freeze."

== See also ==
- List of Antarctic field camps
