= Cape Roberts Project =

Cape Roberts Camp
- Camp
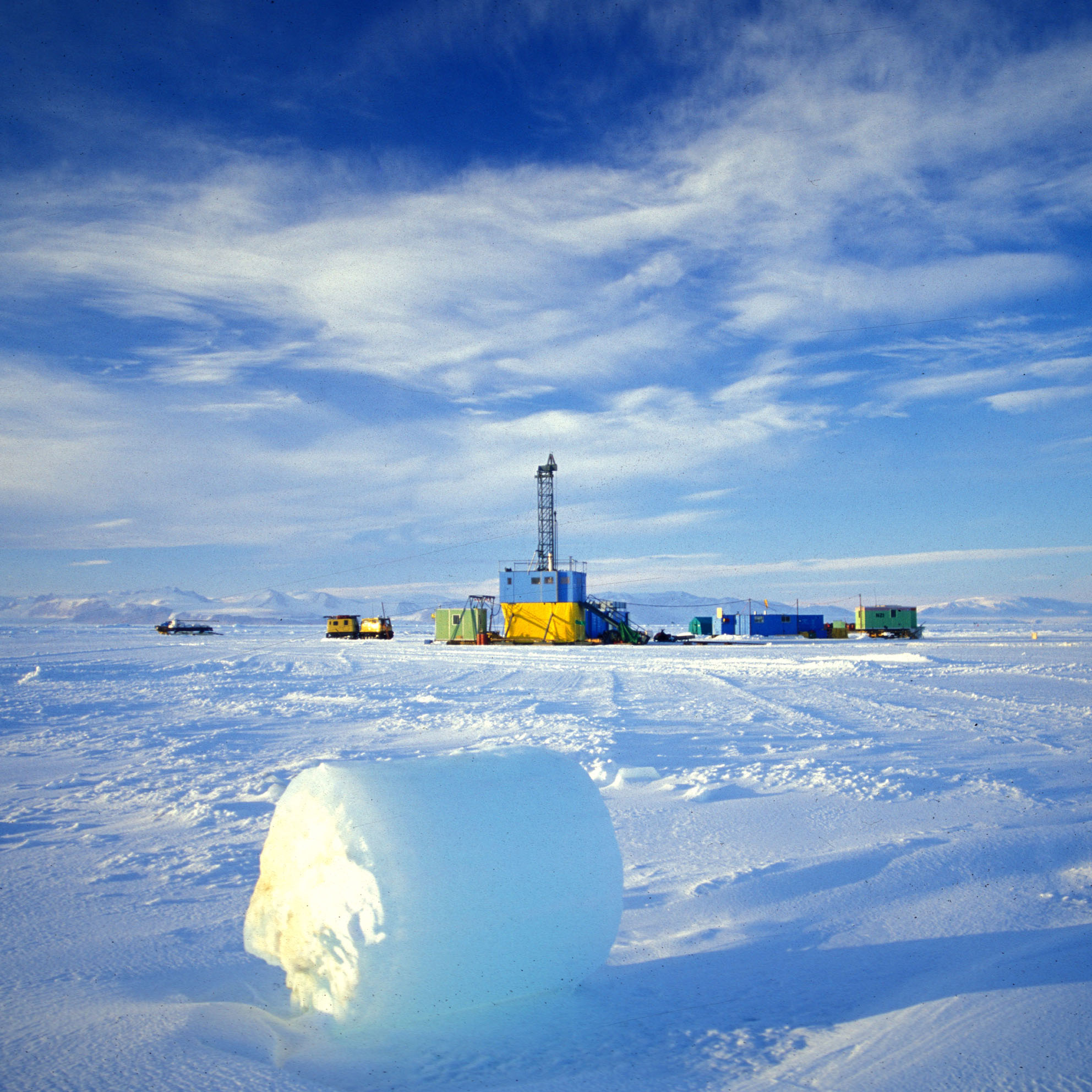
- Drill site of CRP on the sea ice, Ross Sea, Antarctica

- Location of Cape Roberts in Antarctica
- Coordinates: 77°00′22″S 163°43′08″E
- Country: Australia; Germany; Italy; Netherlands; New Zealand; United Kingdom; United States
- Location in Antarctica: Cape Roberts; Antarctica
- Established: 1997
- Type: Seasonal
- Status: Closed 1999

Between 1997 and 1999 the international Cape Roberts Project (CRP) has recovered up to 1,000 m (3,300 ft) long drill cores in the Ross Sea, Antarctica, to reconstruct the glaciation history of Antarctica. Scientists from various institutes in seven countries have participated: Australia, Germany, United Kingdom, The Netherlands, Italy, New Zealand, and the US. After a seismic pre-site survey the area off Cape Roberts in the Ross Sea at the margin of the Transantarctic Mountains (77°S 163°43'E) was found to be suitable.

Drilling was performed using a conventional core wireline system with a drill derrick, protected by a cover against the rough climate. Sea ice was 2 m (6.6 ft) thick with a water depth of 150–300 m (490–980 ft) below. Four overlapping drill cores at three sites reflect in excellent quality the geological history and glaciation of the Antarctic during the last 34 million years.

As a logistic and scientific basis the American McMurdo Station and Scott Base of New Zealand were used. Supply of the drill site was performed with motor sledges and snow mobiles, exchange of personal with helicopters. The costs for the logistics were around US$4 million.

== See also ==
- List of Antarctic field camps

== Gallery ==
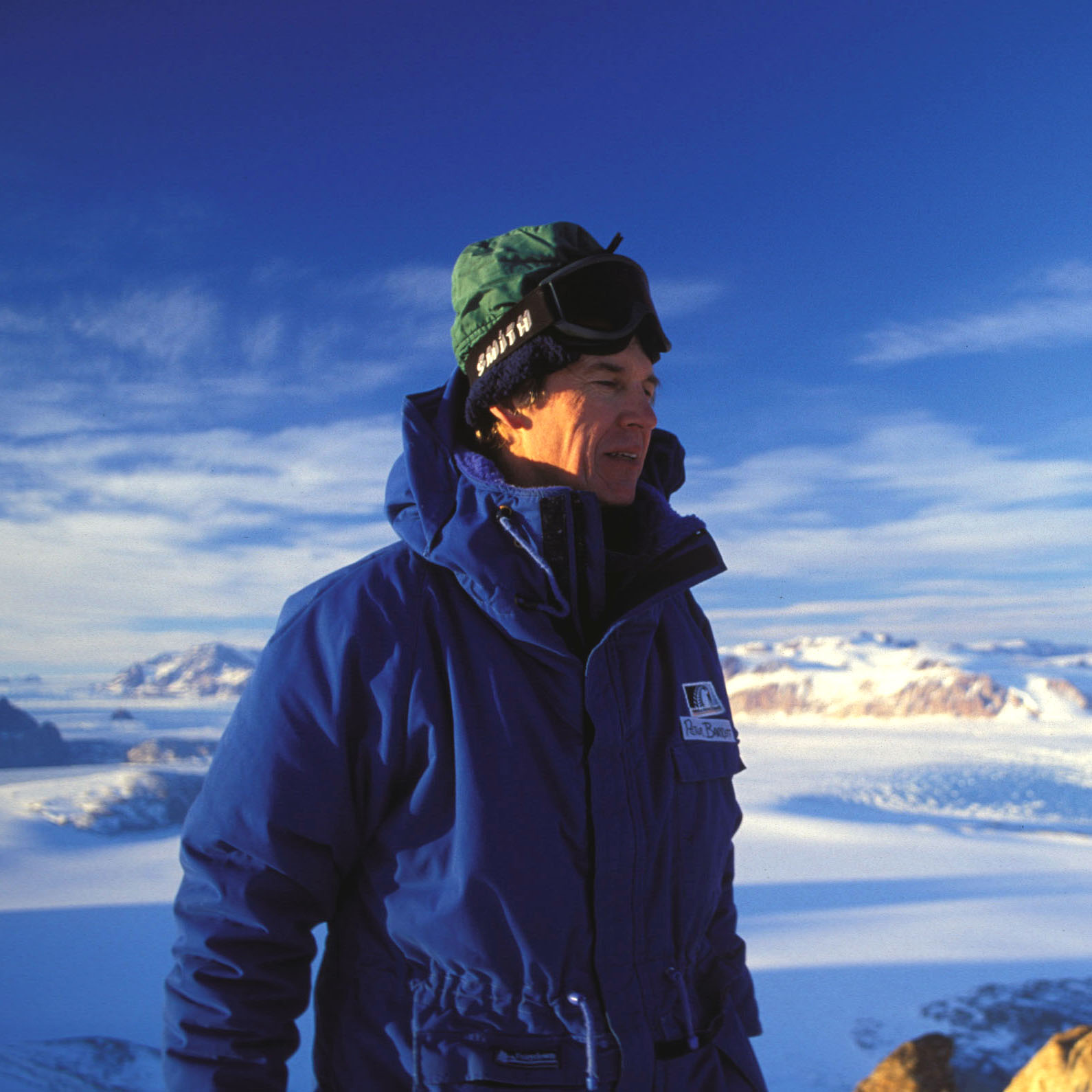
Peter Barrett, chief scientist

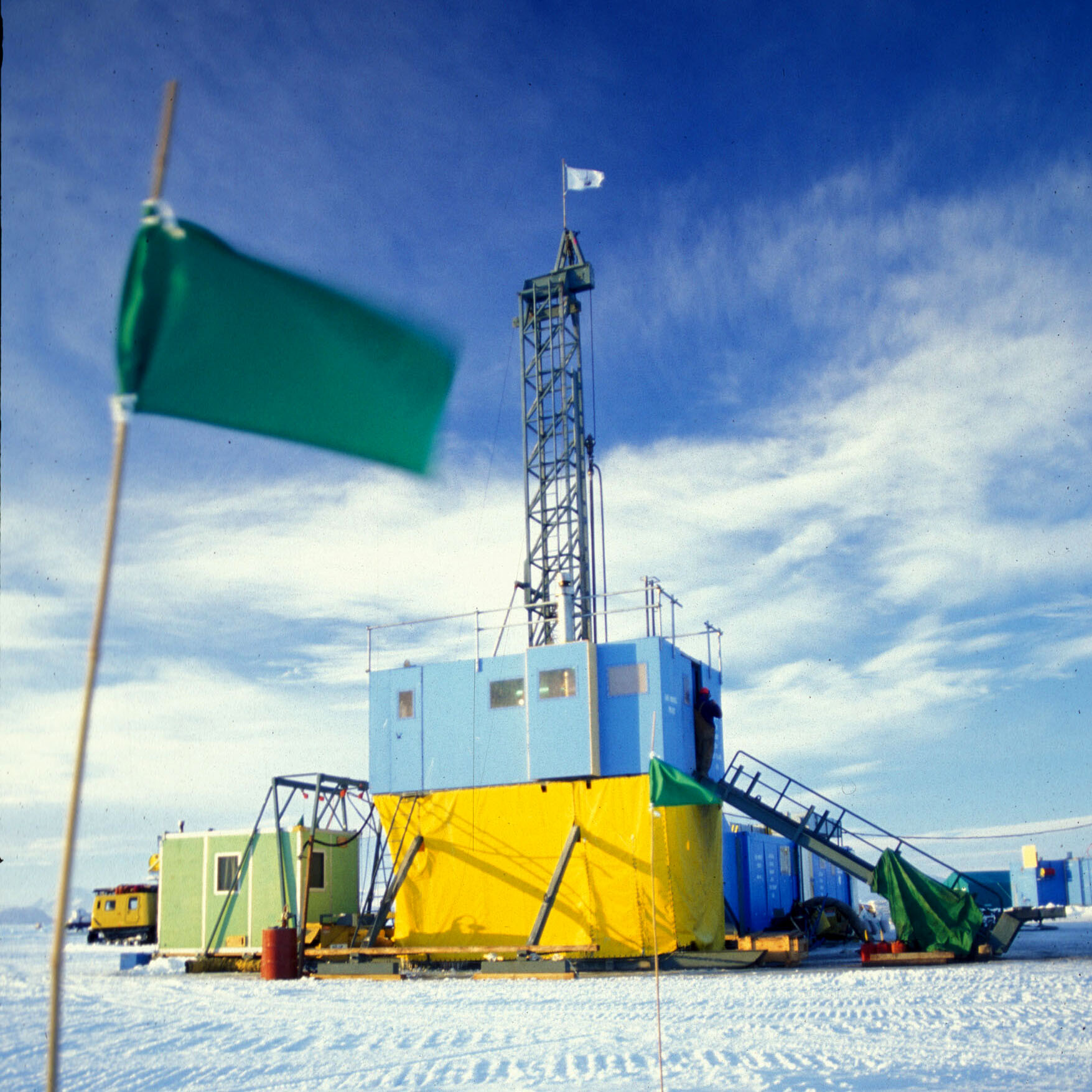
CRP drill derrick on sea ice

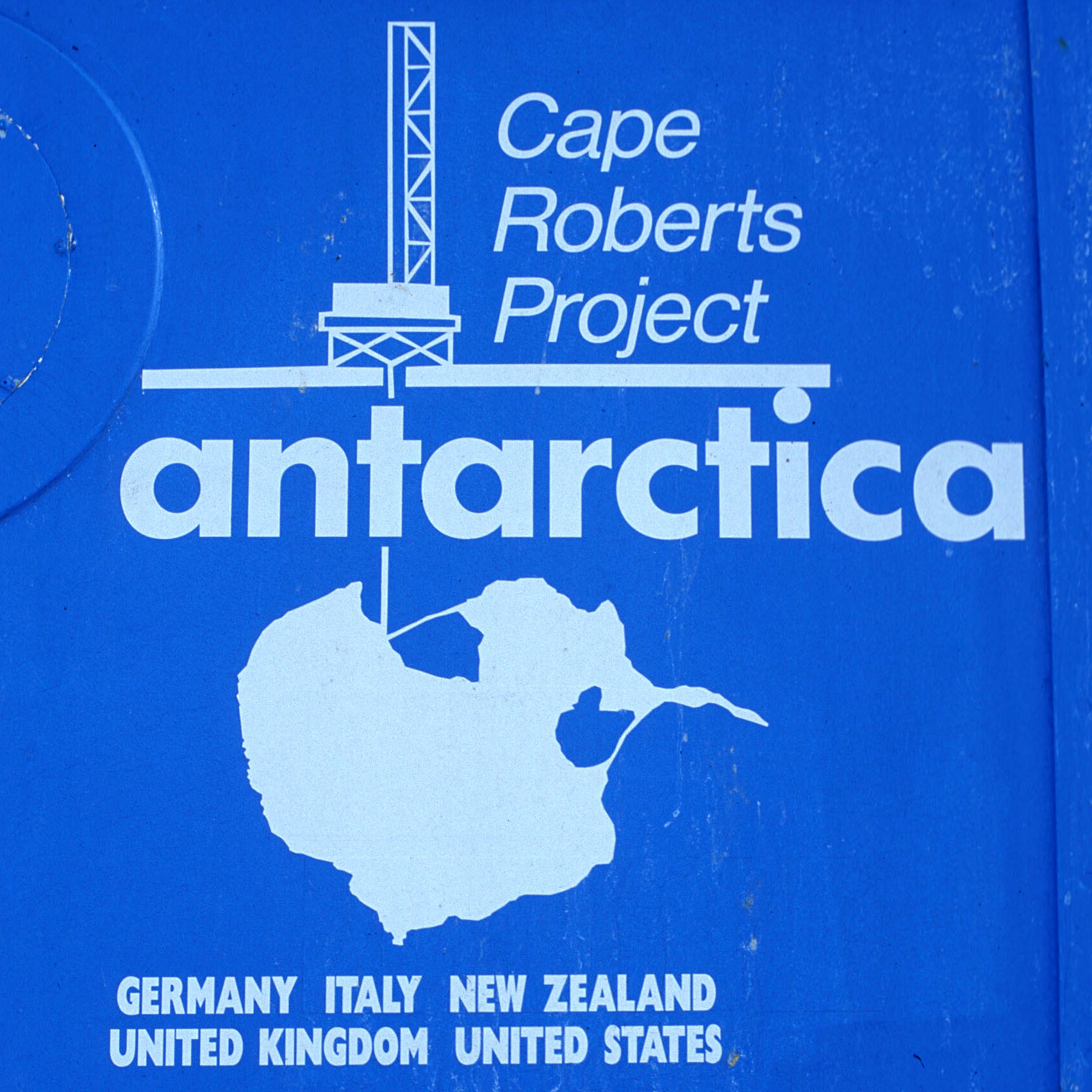
CRP Logo
