= Nobby Nunatak =

Nunatak in Graham Land, Antarctica

Location of the Nobby Nunatak in Antarctic Peninsula, Antarctica

Nobby Nunatak (63°25′S 56°59′W) is a nunatak, 270 m, standing 1 nautical mile (1.9 km) south of Lake Boeckella and 1 nautical mile (1.9 km) east of Mount Flora, at the northeast end of Antarctic Peninsula.

This area was first explored by a party under J. Gunnar Andersson of the Swedish Antarctic Expedition, 1901–04. Nobby Nunatak was first charted and named by the Falkland Islands Dependencies Survey (FIDS) in 1945. The name is descriptive.

== Antonio Moro Refuge ==
Antonio Moro Refuge
- Refuge
- Location of Antonio Moro in Antarctic Peninsula
- Coordinates: 63°25′14″S 56°59′47″W
- Country: Argentina
- Location in Antarctica: Nobby Nunatak; Tabarin Peninsula; Antarctica
- Administered by: Argentine Army
- Established: 1955
- Type: Seasonal
- Status: Operational

Refuge Antonio Moro (63°25′14″S 56°59′47″W), is an Antarctic refuge in Antarctica, located at the Nobby Nunatak on the Tabarin Peninsula in the Trinity Peninsula, administered by the Argentine Army. It was inaugurated on 20 August 1955, renamed Islas Malvinas on 26 August 1971 and rebuilt in 1988.

The original name of the refuge paid homage to Antonio Moro, an Italian immigrant who participated in the construction of the San Martín base in 1951 and who built shelters in the Esperanza area in 1954, including the one that bears his name.

The hut is on a rocky promontory from which one sees the nearby glacier, Mount Flora and the Weddell Sea. Trekking of small groups of tourists to the refuge were proposed from Esperanza in 1985, including a tour from the base to the refuges. The refuge has a capacity for four people, food, fuel, gas for up to 15 days.

== See also ==
- List of Antarctic field camps
