= D59 =

D59 or D-59 may be:

- HMAS Anzac (D59), a Battle class destroyer of the Royal Australian Navy
- HMCS Skeena (D59), an A class destroyer of the Royal Canadian Navy
- Queen's Gambit Declined, in the classification system of the Encyclopaedia of Chess Openings
- D59 road (Croatia), a state road in Croatia
- HMS Ceres (D59)
- D59 (Antarctica), a field camp in Antarctica
