= Hop Island =

Island of Antarctica

- Location within Antarctica

Geography
- Location: Antarctica
- Coordinates: 68°50′S 77°43′E
- Area: 532 ha (1,310 acres)
- Length: 3 km (1.9 mi)
- Width: 2.5 km (1.55 mi)
- Highest elevation: 50 m (160 ft)

Administration
- Administered under the Antarctic Treaty System

Demographics
- Population: Uninhabited

Hop Island is one of the largest of the Rauer Islands, lying 2 km (1.2 mi) west-south-west of Filla Island. It was charted by Norwegian cartographers from aerial photos taken by the Lars Christensen Expedition (1936–37), who gave the name Hopoy. They charted the feature as being even larger, including a southern arm enclosing a cove. The feature was more accurately delineated by John H. Roscoe in 1952 from air photos taken by U.S. Navy Operation Highjump (1946–47). The name Hop Island has been retained for the largest segment of the feature as suggested by Roscoe.

== Important Bird Area ==
A 532 ha site comprising the whole island has been designated an Important Bird Area (IBA) by BirdLife International because it supports about 51,000 breeding pairs of Adélie penguins, estimated from 2011 satellite imagery, as well as a colony of south polar skuas.

== See also ==
- List of Antarctic and Subantarctic islands
