= Antarctic Heritage Trust =

The Antarctic Heritage Trust (New Zealand) which was formed in 1987. Although the two regularly collaborate, the NZAHT is not the same as the UK Antarctic Heritage Trust, formed in 1993, which conserves ex-British bases on the Antarctic Peninsula.

- Promote awareness of the human history of Antarctica and its relevance to the modern world: and to that end
- Identify, restore, preserve and record historic sites in Antarctica, the structures on them and the artifacts which they contain
- Restore, preserve and protect, where appropriate, other elements, including archival records, of the historical heritage of human endeavour in Antarctica
- Provide means by which interested people and organisations may contribute to the achievement of the coalition's objectives
- Be guided by appropriate heritage management standards
- Conform to the principles, purposes and spirit of the Antarctic Treaty, in particular, annex V, Area Protection and Management, of the Protocol on Environmental Protection of Antarctica (The Madrid Protocol); and to
- Cooperate with coalition partners, and others with Antarctic interests, to achieve these objectives.

== See also ==
- Antarctic Heritage Trust (New Zealand)
- UK Antarctic Heritage Trust
