= Flag Point =

- Headland
- Coordinates: 64°49′S 63°31′W
- Location: Wiencke Island, Palmer Archipelago, Antarctica
- Part of: Entrance to Port Lockroy

Flag Point (64°49′S 63°31′W) is a point which lies 0.3 nautical miles (0.6 km) east-southeast of Damoy Point and forms the north side of the entrance to Port Lockroy, Wiencke Island, in the Palmer Archipelago. It was discovered by the French Antarctic Expedition, 1903–05, under Jean-Baptiste Charcot. It was named by the Falkland Islands Dependencies Survey (FIDS) in 1944; when the FIDS base at Port Lockroy was established in 1944, a metal Union Flag was erected on this point.
