= Downstream Bravo Camp =

Field camp in Antarctica

Downstream Bravo Camp (84°1′S 155°0′W) was a manned camp in Antarctica. It served as a refueling station for planes. It is currently unmanned.

== See also ==
- Antarctic field camps
