= Cape Jeremy =

Cape in Antarctica

Cape Jeremy is a cape marking the east side of the north entrance to George VI Sound and the west end of a line dividing Graham Land and Palmer Land, Antarctica. It was discovered by the British Graham Land expedition, 1934–1937, under John Riddoch Rymill, who named it for Jeremy Scott, son of James Maurice Scott, who served as home agent for the expedition and was formerly a member of the British Arctic Air Route Expedition.

== Nogal de Saldán Refuge ==
Nogal de Saldán Refuge
- Refuge
- Location of Nogal de Saldán Refuge in Antarctic Peninsula
- Coordinates: 69°24′04″S 68°49′20″W
- Country: Argentina
- Location in Antarctic Peninsula: Cape Jeremy; Graham Land; Antarctica
- Administered by: Argentine Army
- Established: 1958
- Named after: Paul Groussac
- Type: Seasonal
- Status: Abandoned

Nogal de Saldán Refuge (69°24′04″S 68°49′20″W) is an Argentine Antarctic refuge located south east of Cape Jeremy, on the Fallières Coast. It is administered by the Argentine Army and depends on the San Martín Base, which is 200 km (120 mi) to the north.

Gustavo Adolfo Giró Tapper, with the rank of lieutenant, served as commander of the San Martín Base during the International Geophysical Year of the 1958. Its group was composed of 20 units. In the winter, he drove a patrol with sled pulled by dogs, to Cape Jeremy installing the Refuge Nogal de Saldán in September. Then he crossed the Antarctic Peninsula between Marguerite Bay and the Weddell Sea. The refuge was then abandoned.

== See also ==
- List of Antarctic field camps
