= Neko Harbour =

Capitán Fliess Refuge
- Refuge
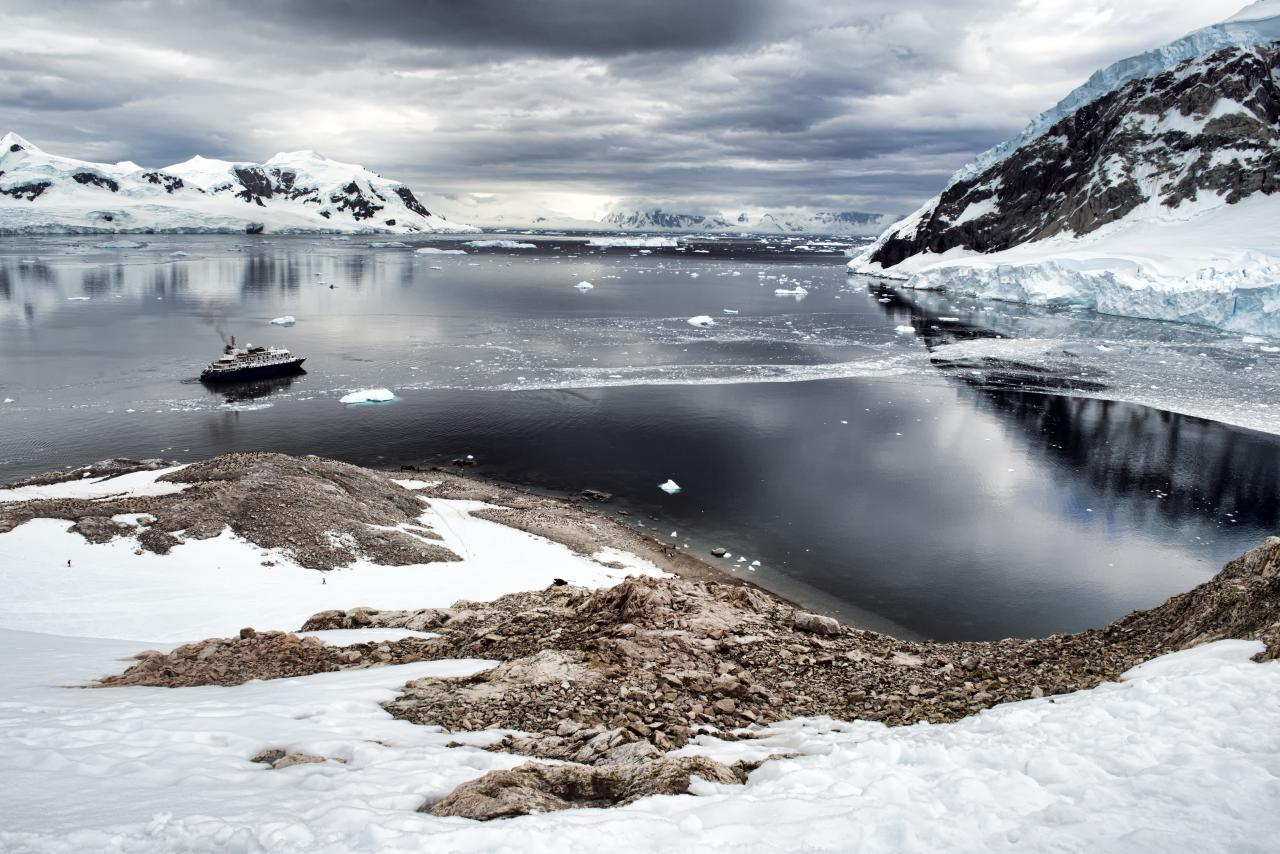
- View of Neko Harbour

- Location of Capitán Fliess Refuge in Antarctic Peninsula
- Coordinates: 64°50′41″S 62°31′48″W
- Country: Argentina
- Location in Antarctic Peninsula: Neko Harbour; Antarctic Peninsula; Antarctica
- Administered by: Argentine Navy
- Established: 1949
- Type: Seasonal
- Status: Operational

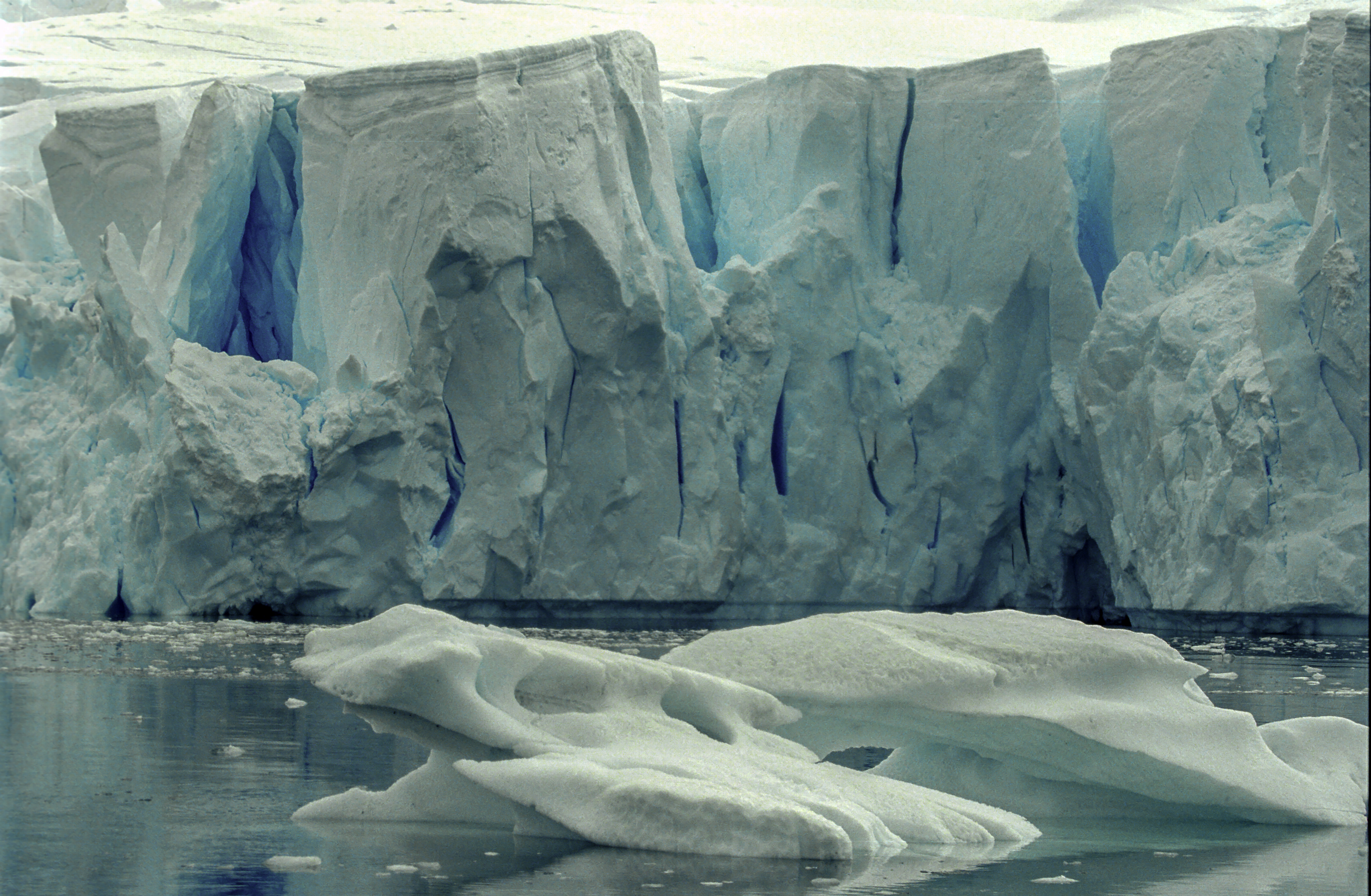
Glacier in Neko Harbour, Antarctica

Neko Harbour (64°50′S 62°33′W) is an inlet of the Antarctic Peninsula on Andvord Bay, situated on the west coast of Graham Land.

Neko Harbour was discovered by Belgian explorer Adrien de Gerlache during the early 20th century. It was named for a Scottish whaling boat, the Neko, which operated in the area between 1911 and 1924.

== Capitán Fliess Refuge ==
Captain Fliess Refuge (64°50′41″S 62°31′48″W) was an Argentine refuge in Antarctica located in Neko Harbour in the Andvord Bay on the Danco Coast, west side of the Antarctic Peninsula. The refuge was opened on April 4, 1949, and managed by the Argentine Navy. It was inaugurated together with the Penguin Observatory and the Rescue Station under the name of Refugio Neko. The name pays tribute to the Lieutenant of the ship Felipe Fliess of the Corvette Uruguay who rescued the Swedish Antarctic Expedition headed by Otto Nordenskjöld.

It was enabled and supplied by the icebreaker ARA Almirante Irízar and the ship ARA Bahía Aguirre in various Antarctic campaigns. The refuge was destroyed by a storm in 2009, was rebuilt in 2011 during the 2011-2012 Antarctic summer campaign. Some Maintenance, repair and conservation of facilities were carried out to be used as support for scientific research. The refuge was washed away by a tidal wave in the 2010s, but the concrete base supports can still be seen.

== Important Bird Area (IBA) ==
Neko Harbour has been classified as an important bird and biodiversity area by BirdLife International because it supports a breeding colony of more than 250 breeding pairs of gentoo penguins that nest on the hill near the beach to avoid risk of being washed away by the large waves frequently generated from the calving of the nearby glacier. Southern giant petrels and south polar skuas also nest here. The area has been also used by Weddell seals, which frequently haul out to rest.

== See also ==
- List of Antarctic field camps
