= Camilla Nichol =

British geologist and museum curator

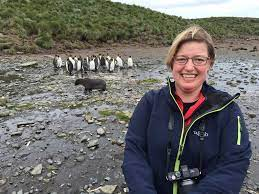
- Nichol in 2016
- Occupations: Geologist; Museum curator; Chief Executive

Academic work
- Discipline: Geology
- Institutions: Hunterian Museum; Yorkshire Museum; Leeds Museums & Galleries; UK Antarctic Heritage Trust

Camilla Nichol FRGS is a British geologist and museum curator. Since 2014, she is the Chief Executive of the United Kingdom Antarctic Heritage Trust.

== Career ==
Nichol studied Geology at the University of Edinburgh and a post-graduate course in Museum Studies at the University of Leicester. Nichol has worked for several museums. She was the Curator of Geology at the Yorkshire Museum, the Head of Collections at Leeds Museums & Galleries, and has also worked for the Hunterian Museum and the Scottish Football Museum.

She is a Trustee of the Cromwell Museum and the Burton Constable Foundation.

Following the years of 2015-2016, Nichol’s publication of "Using Heritage to Engage Antarctic Tourists with Climate Change" allowed for the conclusion that tourism is an effective way to increase awareness of the effects of climate change in the Antarctic region; thereby initiating a greater spread of knowledge about the negative effects taking place in the ice regions of our world.

In 2018, along with a team of researchers, Camilla became invested in a long-term study of penguins in the Antarctic region. Focusing mainly on the Gentoo Penguin (Pygoscelis papua), they were able to scrutinize the population trends of that particular species at a major tourist site in the Antarctic - Goudier Island.

== Select publications ==
- Nichol, C., 2017. "Using Heritage to Engage Antarctic Tourists with Climate Change", in Handbook of Climate Change Communication (Vol 2), 305-315.
- Dunn, M. J., Forcada, J., Jackson, J. A., Waluda, C. M., Nichol, C., and Trathan, N. 2019. "A long-term study of gentoo penguin (Pygoscelis papua) population trends at a major Antarctic tourist site, Goudier Island, Port Lockroy", Biodiversity and Conservation 28(1), 37-53.
