= Antarctic Heritage Trust (New Zealand) =

The Antarctic Heritage Trust (New Zealand) was founded in 1987 and is the oldest member of the Antarctic Heritage Trust coalition. The AHT-NZ is an independent charitable trust based in Christchurch, New Zealand. It was created to care for sites important to the history of the Heroic Age of Antarctic Exploration located in the Ross Sea region of Antarctica.

The sites that the AHT-NZ monitors include: four expedition bases associated with early Antarctic explorers, including those of Robert Falcon Scott, Ernest Shackleton and Carstens Borchgrevink.

AHT-NZ patrons include the Governor General of New Zealand, and before his death Sir Edmund Hillary. The Trust is governed by a board of trustees that represent a number of international agencies and organisations. On an ongoing basis, work is carried out by two full-time staff members in Christchurch.

== Projects ==
Currently the AHT-NZ is engaged in the "Ross Sea Heritage Restoration Project" which was launched by The Princess Royal in Antarctica in 2002.

Although receiving support from the UK Antarctic Heritage Trust, the AHT-NZ has assumed operational responsibility for the preservation of heritage sites in the Ross Sea region, including the above-mentioned huts.

In December 2013, the trust found 22 relatively intact negatives at the Scott site, left by the Shackleton expedition, some of which showed McMurdo Sound landmarks.

== See also ==
- Historic Sites and Monuments in Antarctica
