= Refuge Islands =

Refuge Islands (68°21′S 67°10′W) is a small group of islands lying 1 nautical mile (1.9 km) from the ice cliffs at the southwest side of Red Rock Ridge, off the west coast of Graham Land. Discovered and named by the British Graham Land Expedition (BGLE) under Rymill, 1934–37, who used these islands as a depot for sledge journeys south from the southern base in the Debenham Islands.

== El Plumerillo Refuge ==
El Plumerillo Refuge
- Refuge
- Location of El Plumerillo Refuge in Antarctic Peninsula El Plumerillo Refuge (Antarctica)
- Coordinates: 68°21′09″S 67°09′01″W
- Country: Argentina
- Location in Antarctic Peninsula: Refuge Islands; Fallières Coast; Antarctica
- Administered by: Argentine Army
- Established: 1953
- Type: Seasonal
- Status: Operational

Refuge El Plumerillo (68°21′09″S 67°09′01″W) is an Antarctic refuge located on one islet of the Refuge Islands in the Rymill Bay on the Fallières Coast. The refuge is operated by the Argentine Army and was inaugurated on April 28, 1953. It depends on the San Martín Base located north of the refuge.

The hut is a prefabricated wooden construction, a Sikorsky H-5 helicopter, with aircraft registration LV-XXT, was used during the operations regarding the construction of the shelter. Among the tasks performed, the helicopter indicated the direction of the march and transported food and fuel, even during snowstorms.

On September 24, 1953, the helicopter flew to the shelter and attempted to descend to a predetermined place. In a moment the tail rotor of the helicopter crashed into a mound of ice and rock, falling on its right side, breaking the main rotor, the landing gear and part of the cabin. There were no injuries or deaths and it was possible to rescue the light objects from the load. The helicopter remained there for a year until it was dismantled and taken to the San Martin Base.

== See also ==
- List of Antarctic and sub-Antarctic islands
- List of Antarctic field camps
