= Trajer Ridge =

Rock ridge in Antarctica

Trajer Ridge (68°34′S 78°30′E) is a rock ridge about 125 m high at the south side of the base of Breidnes Peninsula, Vestfold Hills. The region was photographed by U.S. Navy Operation Highjump (1946–47), ANARE (Australian National Antarctic Research Expeditions) (1954, 1957 and 1958) and the Soviet Antarctic Expedition (1956). Named by Antarctic Names Committee of Australia (ANCA) for F.L. Trajer, weather observer at Davis Station (1961) who, with M. Hay, visited the feature on foot on November 4, 1961.
