= Scott Base =

New Zealand Antarctic base

- Antarctic base
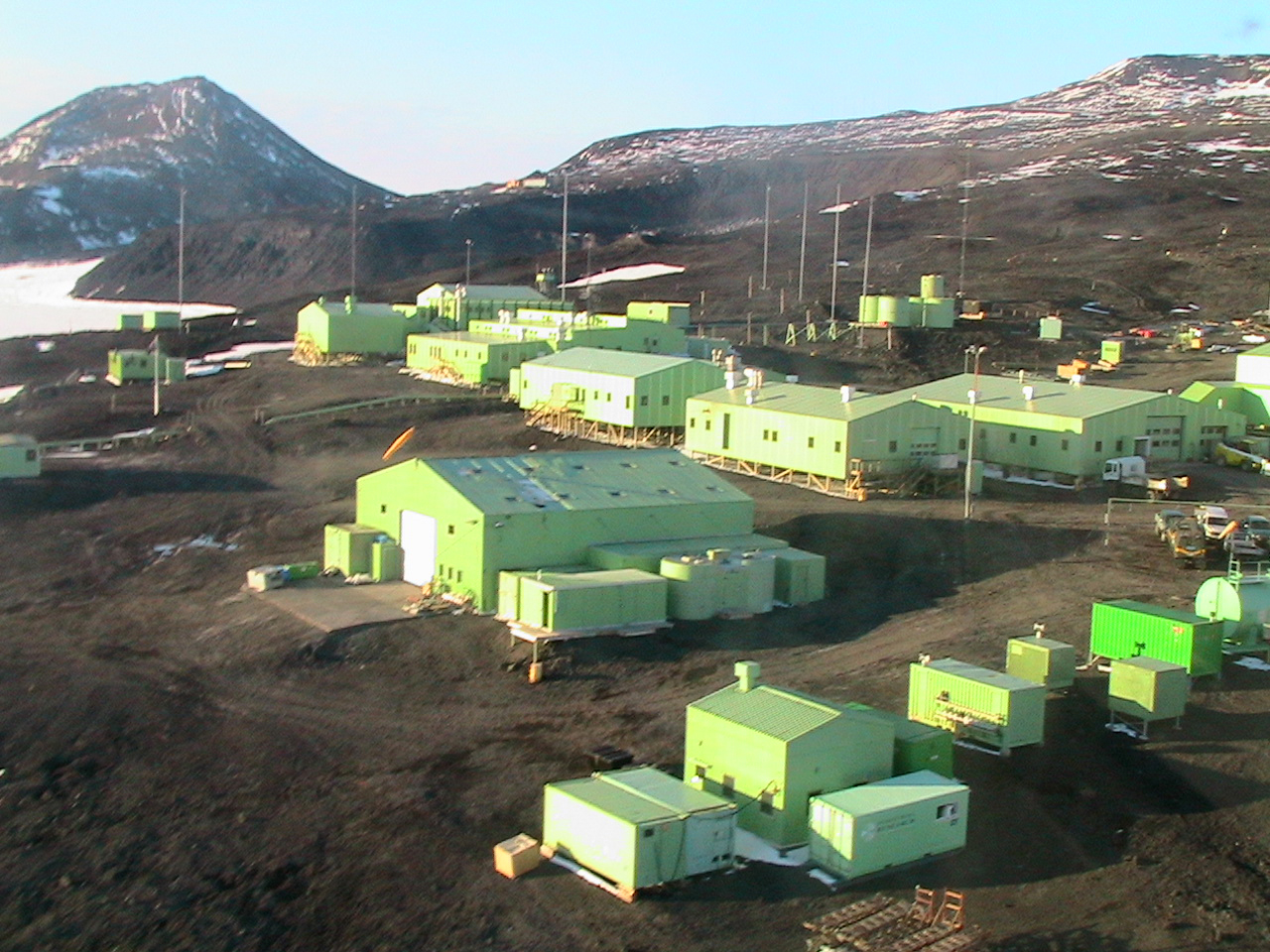
- Aerial photograph of Scott Base, looking towards Observation Hill at left.

- Location of Scott Base in Antarctica
- Coordinates: 77°50′57″S 166°46′06″E
- Country: New Zealand
- Location in Antarctica: Ross Island; Ross Dependency; Antarctica
- Administered by: Antarctica New Zealand
- Established: 20 January 1957; 69 years ago
- Named for: Captain Robert Falcon Scott, RN
- Elevation: 10 m (33 ft)

Population (2017)
  - Summer: 78
  - Winter: 11
- Time zone: UTC+12 (NZST)
  - Summer (DST): UTC+13 (NZDST)
- UN/LOCODE: AQ SBA
- Type: All year-round
- Period: Annual
- Status: Operational
- Activities: List: Climatology; Geocryology; Paleoclimatology; Sedimetology; Geomorphology; Paleolimnology
- Website: antarcticanz.govt.nz/scott-base

Scott Base is a New Zealand Antarctic research station at Pram Point on Ross Island near Mount Erebus in New Zealand's Ross Dependency territorial claim. It was named in honour of Captain Robert Falcon Scott, RN, leader of two British expeditions to the Ross Sea area of Antarctica. The base was set up as support to field research and the centre for research into earth sciences, and now conducts research in many fields, operated by Antarctica New Zealand.

The base is 3 kilometres (1.9 mi) from the larger U.S. McMurdo Station via Willy Field road, the main road to Williams Field.

== History ==
Scott Base was originally constructed in support of the UK inspired and privately managed Commonwealth Trans-Antarctic Expedition (TAE). The New Zealand government provided support for the TAE and also for the International Geophysical Year (IGY) project of 1957, five of whose members were attached to the Expedition. In February 1956, 10 months before the TAE and IGY parties were due to head to the Antarctic, Frank Ponder, an architect at the Ministry of Works (New Zealand), was given the task of designing the base. Ponder's design consisted of six main buildings and three smaller scientific labs. The main buildings were to be placed at least 7 metres apart because of fire risk but were linked to one another by a covered way of galvanised iron. Three New Zealand observers who were also given the task of selecting the site for a base went to McMurdo Sound with the United States "Operation Deep Freeze I" in the summer of 1955. After evaluating possible sites, a location near Butter Point was chosen. This was later changed to Pram Point as it provided better access for offloading supplies from the Expedition ship HMNZS Endeavour and also allowed for the operation of the critical RNZAF Antarctic Flight on a nearby ice runway. The base looks out over what is now known as Haskell Strait. Scott Base passed over to New Zealand Government ownership via the Department of Scientific and Industrial Research (DSIR), on 5 March 1958, at the conclusion of the TAE.

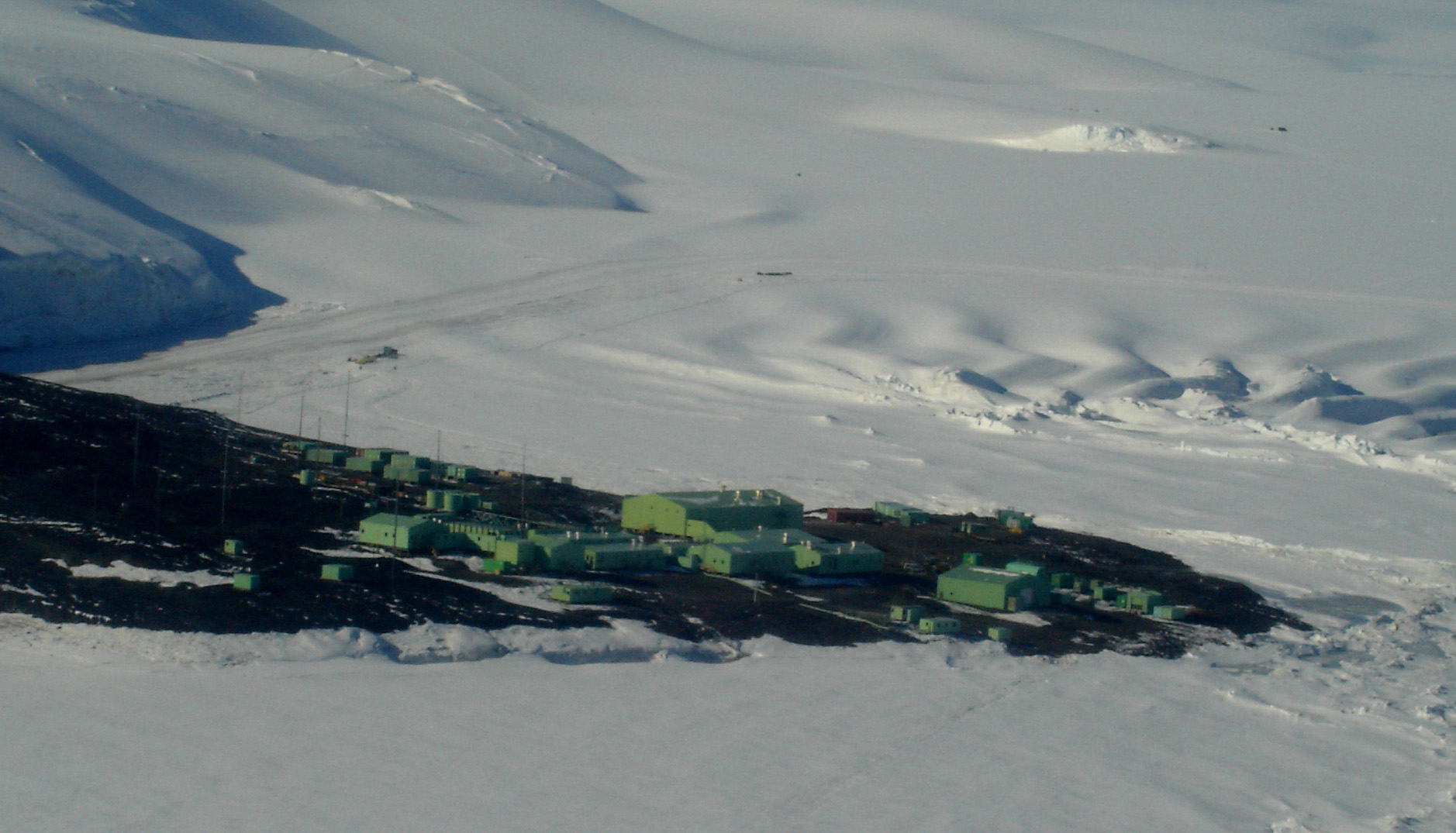
Aerial photograph of Scott Base, Ross Island, Antarctica

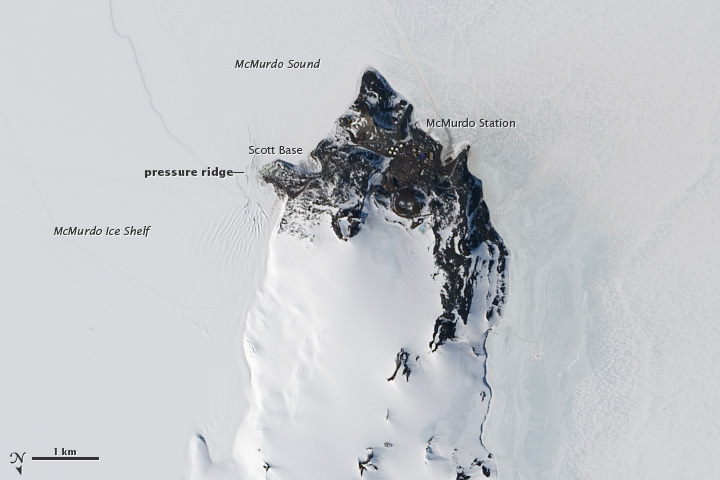
Annotated view over Scott Base, also showing McMurdo Station and the McMurdo Ice Shelf

During the IGY the United States facility at Hut Point did not operate as a scientific base. It was the New Zealand expedition's responsibility to furnish the important scientific data (auroral, ionospheric, seismic, etc.), linking the McMurdo area research activities with those of the United States Pole Station and the joint United States–New Zealand station at Cape Hallett, Victoria Land.

=== Scientific research and expansion ===
In 1958, following completion of the TAE and IGY, New Zealand made the decision to continue to operate Scott Base for scientific research, much of which depends upon the continuity of recorded data over a period of years. In order to maintain operations, a base rebuilding programme began in 1976.

New Zealander Robert B. Thomson, who was officer-in-charge at Wilkes Station in 1962, was deputy leader at Scott at in 1963–64. Thomson Peak, in the Mirabito Range, Victoria Land, was named after him. The leader of Scott Base for the 1964–65 season, Adrian Hayter, published a personal memoir of his experience. He was preceded as Leader by Russell Rawle and followed by Mike Prebble. These three leaders were commemorated with Rawle Glacier, Mount Hayter, and Prebble Glacier.

From 1957 until 1986, dogs played a part in base operations. Initially, they were an essential means of transport, but with better technology, their importance dwindled until they were removed in line with environmental treaties.

Scientific diving operations began in 1985. Between 1985 and 2006, a total of 1,296 had been logged.

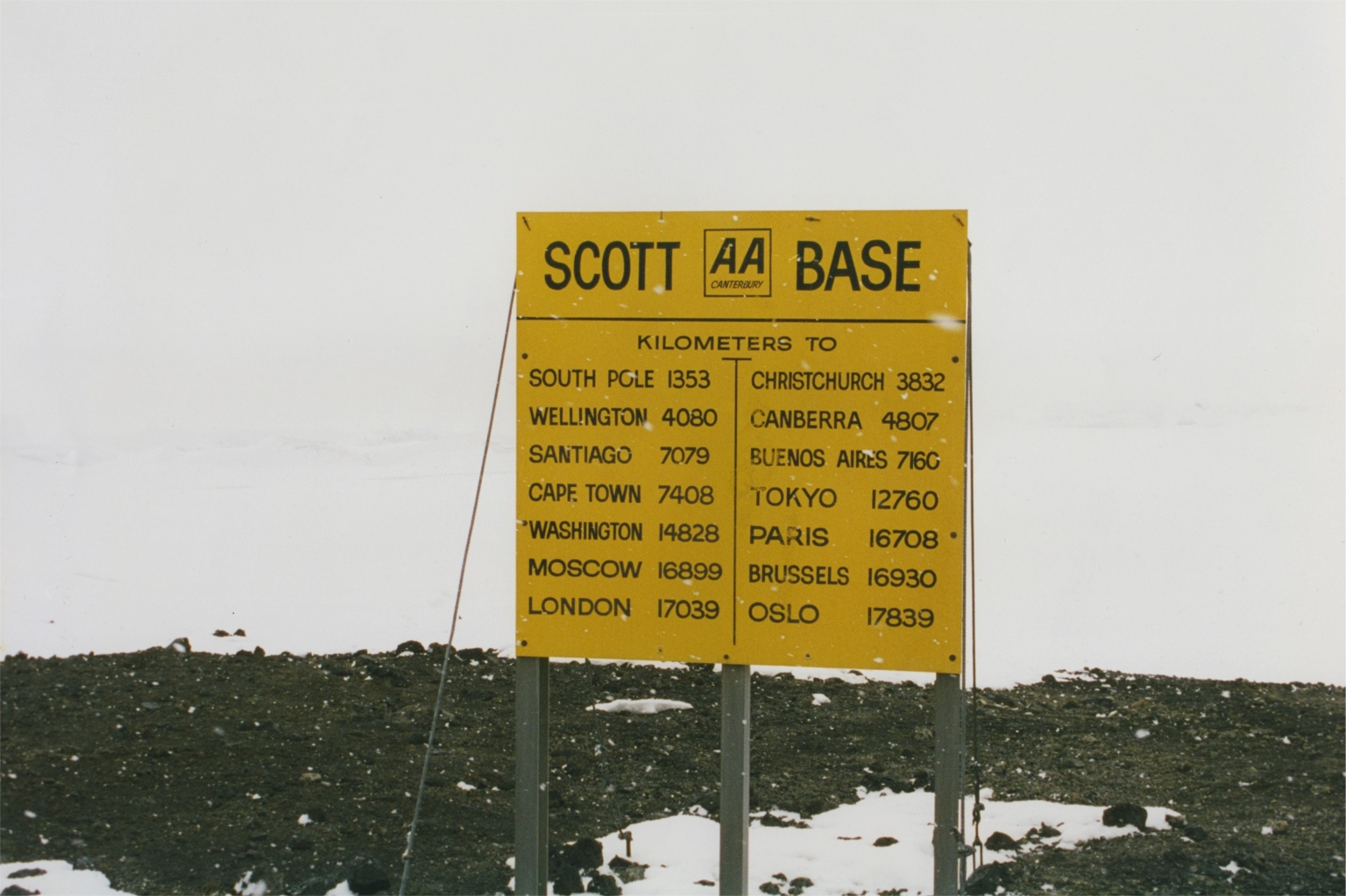
Scott Base

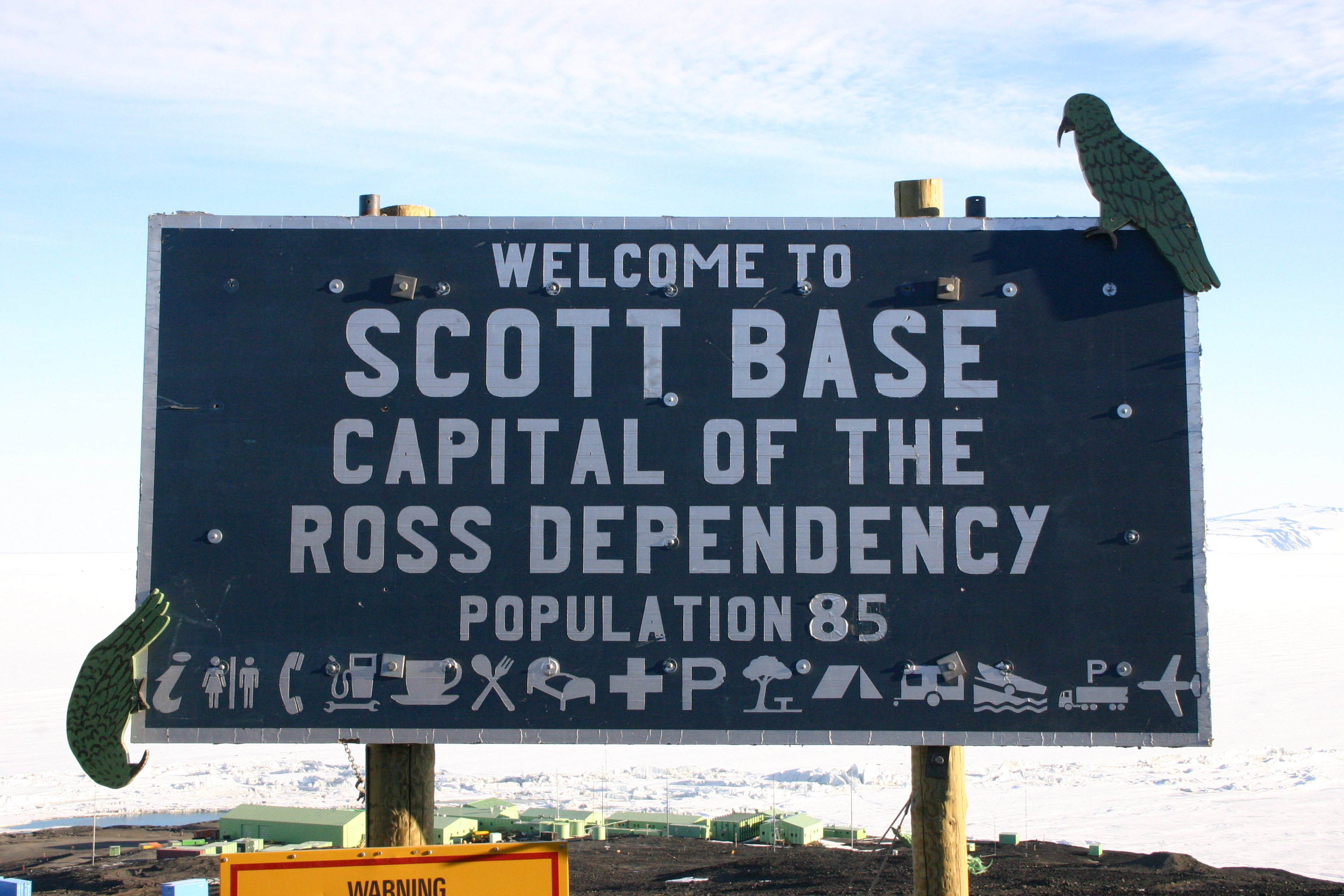
Sign for Scott Base on road to McMurdo Station

=== 21st century ===
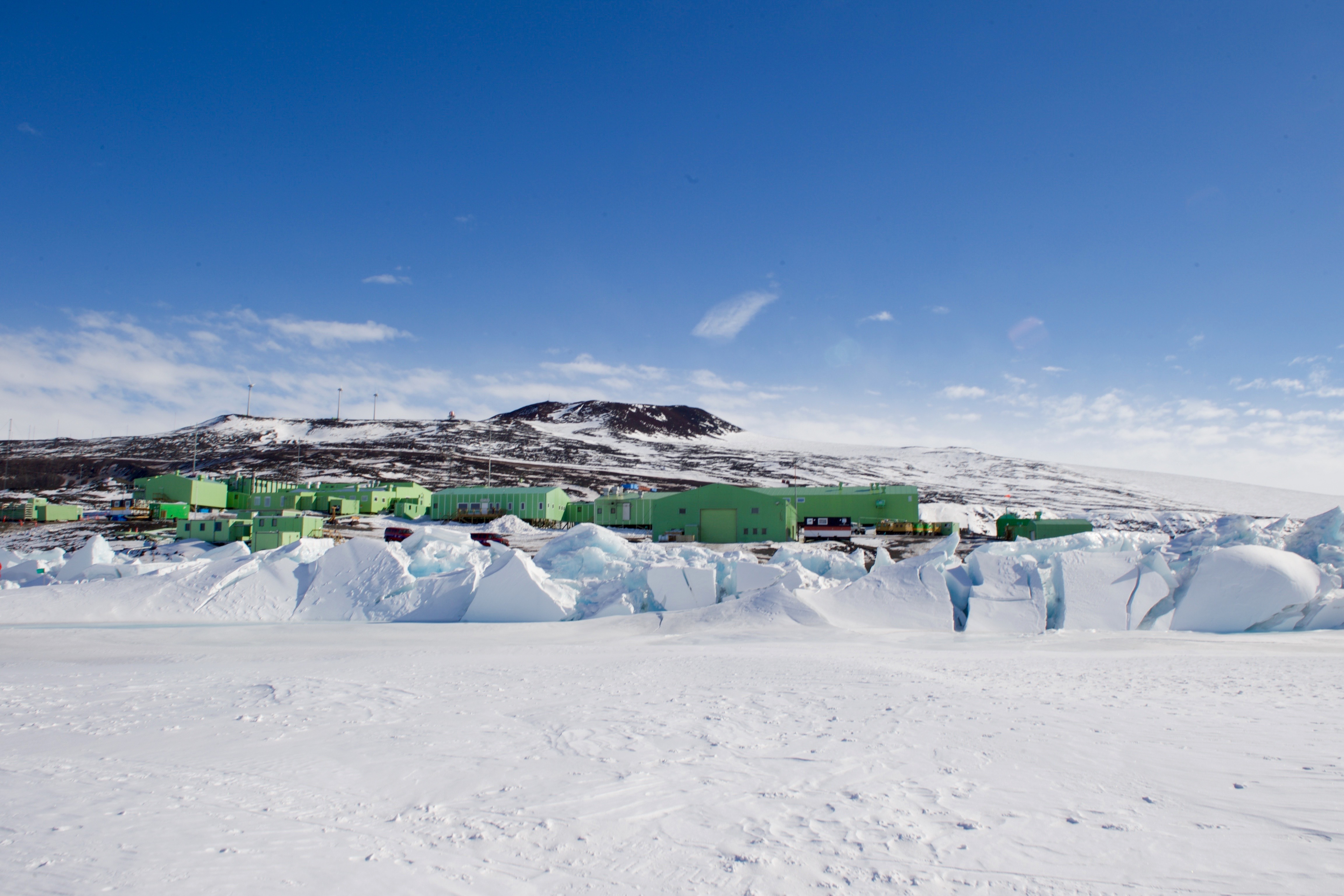
Scott Base in 2016

As of 2008, the only original building was the TAE "A" mess hut, which contains material recording New Zealand's involvement in Antarctica since 1957. In 2005 the two-story high Hillary Field Centre was commissioned, increasing the floor area of Scott Base by 1,800 m^{2} (19,000 sq ft) and providing work areas to support field parties as well as additional office space. The building was officially opened by then-Foreign Minister Phil Goff and Sir Edmund Hillary.

=== Redevelopment and expansion ===
In support of the future of New Zealand's Antarctic science programme, in June 2019 the Government committed NZ$498 million (US$286.8 million) for the next phase of the Scott Base Redevelopment project, which includes a plan to replace the base's 11 separate buildings with four large interconnected buildings. Jasmax and Hugh Broughton Architects produced the architectural design.

On 5 November 2021, Antarctica New Zealand confirmed that PrimePort Timaru would host the redevelopment of the prefabricated Scott Base facilities. Besides the three interconnected buildings, the project also involves upgrading the Ross Island wind farm.

The redevelopment was paused in 2023 after the cost of constructing and transporting the proposed three building design exceeded the approved funding. Following an independent review amongst various plans, Cabinet approved a reset redevelopment programme in May 2026, with the project authorised to proceed in July 2026.

The revised plan will increase the total floor area to approximately 6,500 m^{2} (70,000 sq ft) and includes new accommodation and communal facilities, science and operational spaces, replacement of ageing infrastructure, and a major upgrade to the Ross Island wind farm to improve grid stability of Scott Base's electricity supply. Completion is scheduled for 2030.

=== Historic site ===
The A Hut of Scott Base is the only existing Commonwealth Trans-Antarctic Expedition (1956–1957) building in Antarctica. It has been designated a Historic Site or Monument (HSM 75), following a proposal by New Zealand to the Antarctic Treaty Consultative Meeting.

== Facilities ==
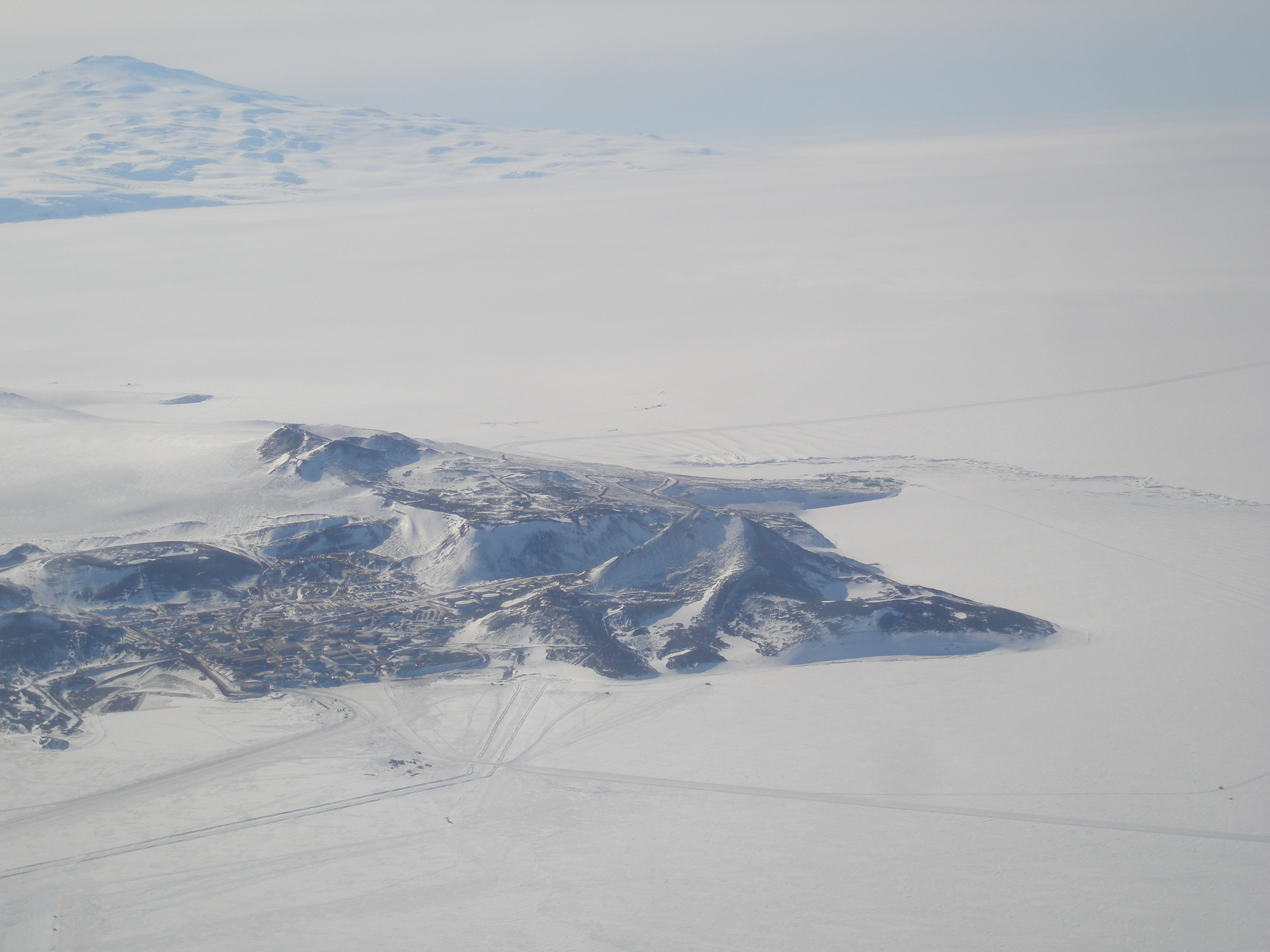
Aerial view of the tip of Hut Point Peninsula with McMurdo Station on the near side and Scott Base on the far side

The base is made up of a collection of Chelsea Cucumber green buildings which are linked by all-weather corridors. These buildings can accommodate 86 people over summer, with between 10 and 14 people remaining over the winter.

Its first data connection to the outside world was established in 1992, when Telecom NZ installed a satellite earth station at Arrival Heights, 3 km (1.9 mi) northwest of Scott Base. In March 2023, Antarctica New Zealand installed Starlink on a trial basis to supplement the existing systems, thus providing faster internet connection and greater capacity for mobile phones and data transfers.

Scott Base is today operated by Antarctica New Zealand.

=== Wind turbines ===
Three Enercon E-33 wind turbines (330 kilowatts (440 hp) each) were installed in 2009 to co-power Scott Base and McMurdo Station, reducing diesel consumption by 11%: 463,000 litres (102,000 imp gal; 122,000 US gal) per year. Battery failures have reduced power capacity by 66%.

"the small battery component that we have within our grid which we called the power store unfortunately has failed, and that was due to the failure of a non-replaceable part, so that has significantly limited our ability to use our wind turbines to the fullest capacity, so in 2019 we've had to curtail our Wind Farm to about 33% of its full potential"

Three new wind turbines were planned for the 2024–2025 season, with great capacity: one new one will be greater than the previous three combined. The strong winds make wind power a practical alternative, and the new wind system should supply 90% of the power at Scott Base.

== Climate ==
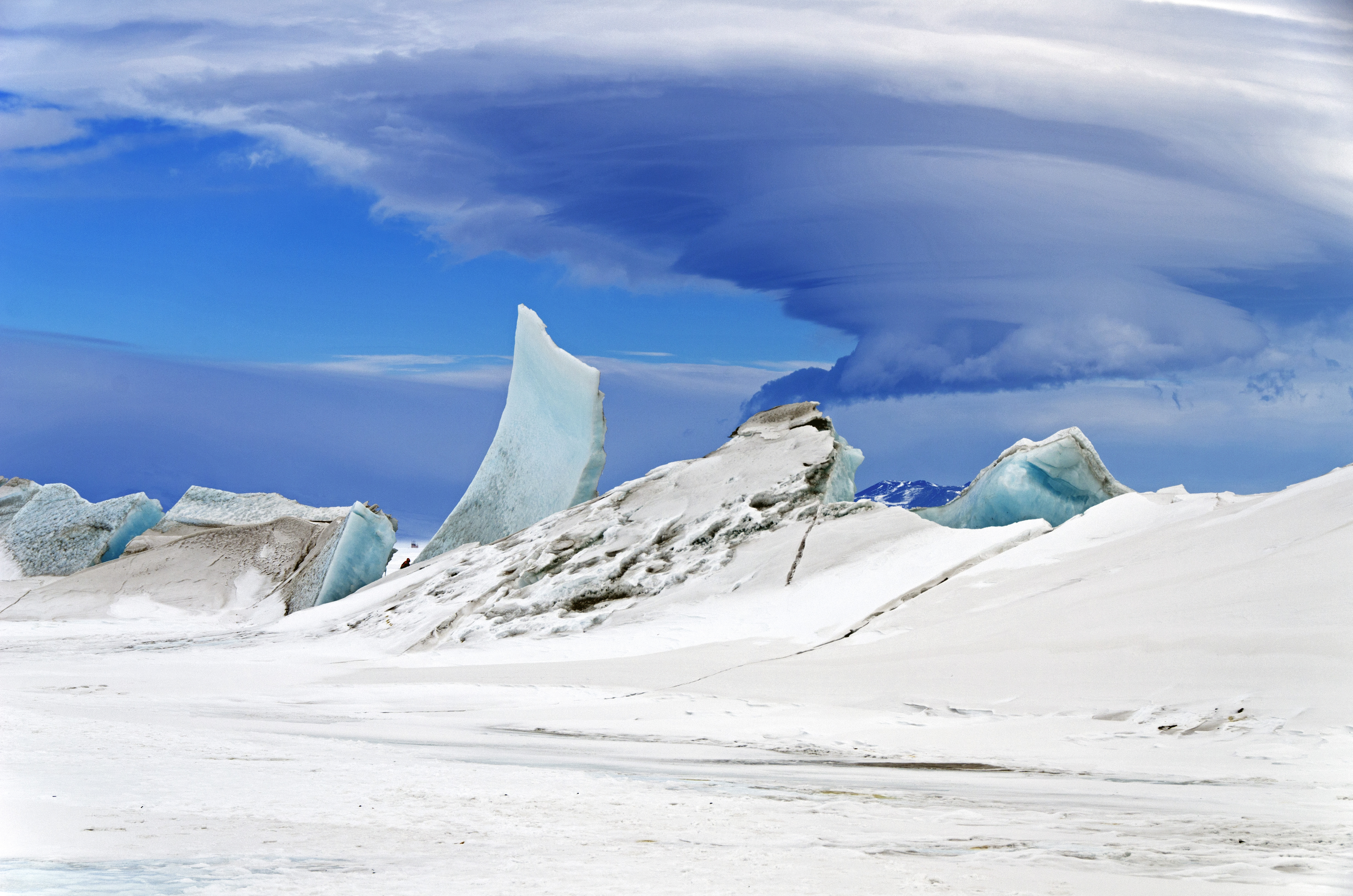
A pressure ridge in the Antarctic ice near Scott Base, with lenticular clouds in the sky

A polar ice cap climate with evenly-distributed precipitation (Köppen EFf) prevails at Scott Base. The base has fairly typical weather conditions for coastal Antarctica, with minimum temperatures around −45 °C (−49 °F) and summer maximum only occasionally above freezing point. It is exposed to the full strength of southerly blizzards, although overall it is less windy than McMurdo Station. The maximum wind velocities experienced have been gusts up to 185 kilometres per hour (115 mph) with steady velocities under blizzard conditions of 95–115 kilometres per hour (59–71 mph). The highest recorded temperature was 6.8 °C (44.2 °F), the coolest −57 °C (−71 °F) and the mean temperature −19.6 °C (−3.3 °F).

Climate data for Scott Base (1991−2020)
Month	Jan	Feb	Mar	Apr	May	Jun	Jul	Aug	Sep	Oct	Nov	Dec	Year
Mean daily maximum °C (°F)	−1.3 (29.7)	−7.4 (18.7)	−15.9 (3.4)	−18.9 (−2.0)	−19.8 (−3.6)	−20.0 (−4.0)	−22.3 (−8.1)	−22.8 (−9.0)	−20.5 (−4.9)	−15.3 (4.5)	−7.0 (19.4)	−1.3 (29.7)	−14.4 (6.1)
Daily mean °C (°F)	−4.6 (23.7)	−11.1 (12.0)	−20.5 (−4.9)	−24.6 (−12.3)	−25.7 (−14.3)	−25.8 (−14.4)	−28.6 (−19.5)	−29.3 (−20.7)	−26.7 (−16.1)	−20.3 (−4.5)	−11.1 (12.0)	−4.6 (23.7)	−19.4 (−2.9)
Mean daily minimum °C (°F)	−7.9 (17.8)	−14.8 (5.4)	−25.0 (−13.0)	−30.2 (−22.4)	−31.7 (−25.1)	−31.5 (−24.7)	−34.9 (−30.8)	−35.8 (−32.4)	−32.9 (−27.2)	−25.3 (−13.5)	−15.2 (4.6)	−7.9 (17.8)	−24.4 (−11.9)
Average precipitation mm (inches)	18 (0.7)	21 (0.8)	14 (0.6)	16 (0.6)	23 (0.9)	22 (0.9)	13 (0.5)	12 (0.5)	11 (0.4)	13 (0.5)	12 (0.5)	9 (0.4)	184 (7.2)
Average relative humidity (%)	76.2	70.7	71.6	71.3	70.3	69.0	66.6	67.2	66.4	68.7	67.6	73.2	69.9
Source 1: NIWA Climate Data
Source 2: Weatherbase

== See also ==
- List of Antarctic expeditions
- List of permanent Antarctic research stations
- List of Antarctic field camps
- Marble Point
- Castle Rock (Antarctica)
- Ross Ice Shelf
- The Antarctic Sun
- Williams Field
- Crime in Antarctica
