= Castle Rock (Antarctica) =

Rock crag in Antarctica

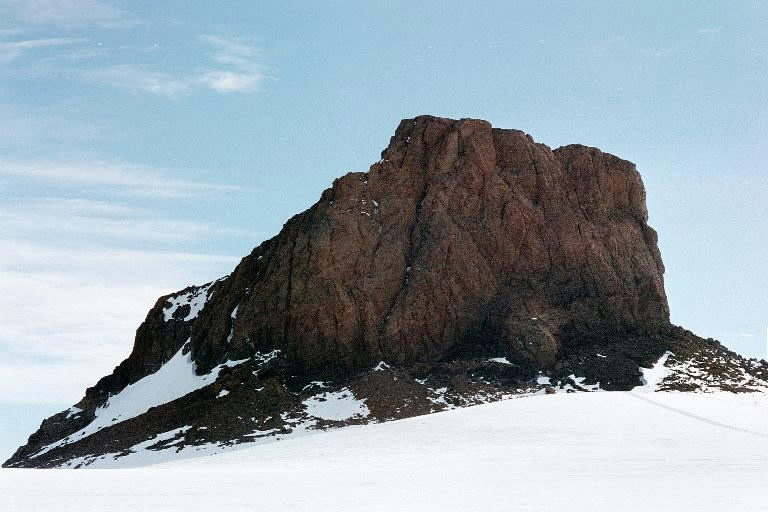
- Castle Rock

Highest point
- Elevation: 415 m (1,362 ft)
- Coordinates: 77°48′S 166°46′E

Geography
- Location within Antarctica
- Continent: Antarctica
- Region: Ross Dependency

Castle Rock (77°48′S 166°46′E) is a bold rock crag, 415 metres (1,362 ft) high, standing 3 nautical miles (5.6 km; 3.5 mi) northeast of Hut Point on the central ridge of Hut Point Peninsula, Ross Island, Antarctica. It was discovered by the British National Antarctic Expedition, 1901–04, under Robert Falcon Scott, who so named it because of its shape. The feature was a landmark for sledging parties returning from journeys to the south.

== Geology ==
Castle Rock is part of the McMurdo Volcanic Group, a large group of Cenozoic alkaline volcanic rocks found from Cape Adare south to the Ross Ice Shelf in the West Antarctic Rift System. It is within the Erebus province of this group, which includes Mount Erebus and the Hut Point Peninsula. It is a flat-topped monolith with steep sides. Its distinct shape is mostly formed by hyaloclastite sequences, and is very similar to subglacial volcanoes found in Iceland and the Antarctic Peninsula. The steep sides are due to the volcano being confined by glacial ice each time it erupted.

== Recreational trail ==
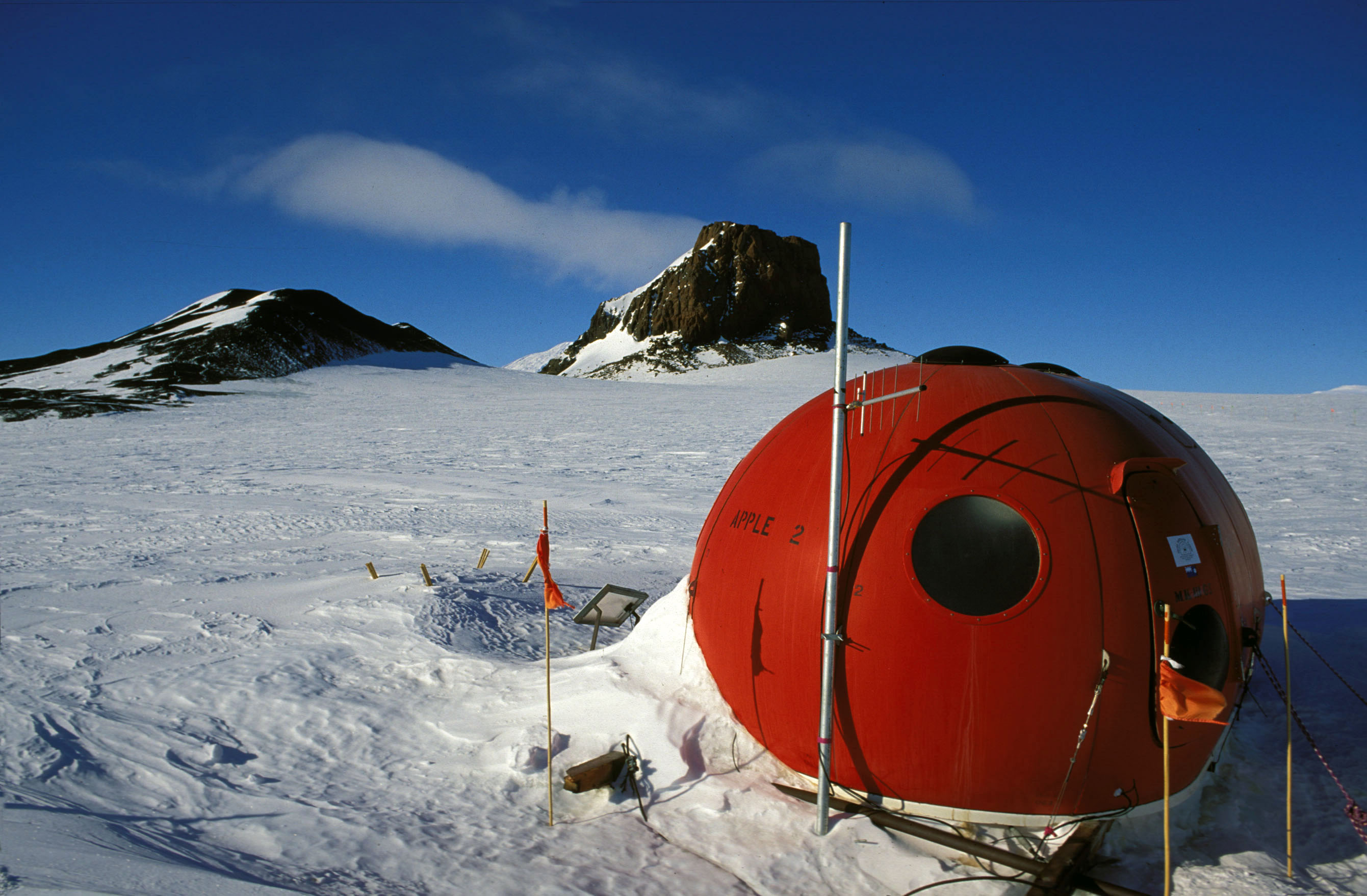
Emergency shelter near Castle Rock

There is a recreational route over a snow and ice field that makes a loop from Scott Base to Castle Rock, starting from Twin Crater and going to Castle Rock via Half Moon Crater. It returns past Sheppard Crater and Kiwi Ski Hill. There are three emergency shelters along the way. The route may be used by hikers, runners or skiers, and is the most demanding in the McMurdo Station area on Ross island. At Castle Rock there is a route to the Castle Rock summit with a fixed line as a handhold.

== Sources ==
- Alberts, Fred G., ed. (1995), Geographic Names of the Antarctic (PDF) (2 ed.), United States Board on Geographic Names This article incorporates public domain material from websites or documents of the United States Board on Geographic Names.
- Castle Rock, Antarctica New Zealand
- Herbert, Jessie (2011), The Formation of Castle Rock Hut Point Peninsular Antarctica (thesis), University of Canterbury, hdl:10092/14173
- Herried, Brad; Heil, Joe (November 2012), Ross Island Trail System (PDF), PGC
