= Mount Flora =

Mountain in Graham Land, Antarctica

Coordinates: 63°25′S 57°1′W

Mount Flora is a mountain, 520 m (1,700 ft) high, containing a well-defined cirque which faces north-east, standing 0.5 nmi (1 km) south-east of the head of Hope Bay, at the north-east end of the Antarctic Peninsula. It was discovered by the Swedish Antarctic Expedition under Otto Nordenskiöld, 1901–04, and named by Johan Gunnar Andersson, second-in-command of the expedition who discovered plant fossils of the Jurassic period there.

== Antarctic Specially Protected Area ==
A 30 hectares (74 acres) site on the northern slopes of the mountain, encompassing the fossiliferous strata, has been designated an Antarctic Specially Protected Area (ASPA No.148). It is a scientifically important site for geological, paleobotanical and paleoclimatological studies. It lies about 3 kilometres (1.6 nmi) south-east of Argentina’s Esperanza Base and is easily accessible on foot from there and from Hope Bay.
