= D59 (Antarctica) =

- Camp
- Location of D59 in Antarctica
- Coordinates: 69°37′12″S 135°21′36″E
- Country: United States
- Location in Antarctica: East Antarctic Ice Sheet; Antarctica
- Established: 1971
- Type: Seasonal
- Status: Abandoned

D59 is a field camp in Antarctica on the land traverse between Dumont d'Urville (French coastal station) and Dome C (Franco-Italian high antarctic plateau station). It is known mainly for the two LC-130 crashes which happened in 1971 (eventually repaired and recovered 16 years later) and 1987 with two dead.

== See also ==
- List of Antarctic field camps
