= Persson Island =

Island in Graham Land, Antarctica

- Location of Persson Island

- Location in Antarctica Persson Island (Antarctica)

Geography
- Location: Antarctica
- Coordinates: 64°11′30″S 58°23′34″W
- Archipelago: James Ross Island group
- Length: 2 km (1.2 mi)

Administration
- Administered under the Antarctic Treaty System

Persson Island is an island 1.5 nautical miles (2.8 km) long, lying in the entrance to Rohss Bay on the southwest side of James Ross Island. Discovered by the Swedish Antarctic Expedition under Nordenskjold, 1901–04, and named by him for Nils Persson, a patron of the expedition.

== General San Martin Refuge ==
General San Martin Refuge is an Antarctic refuge located on Persson Island, southwest of James Ross Island in the far north of the Antarctic Peninsula. It is administered by the Argentine Army and was opened on 17 August 1955, with the function of logistic support point and is currently not in activity.

== See also ==
- List of Antarctic and sub-Antarctic islands
