= Damoy Point =

Headland in Antarctica

Damoy Point Hut
- Hut
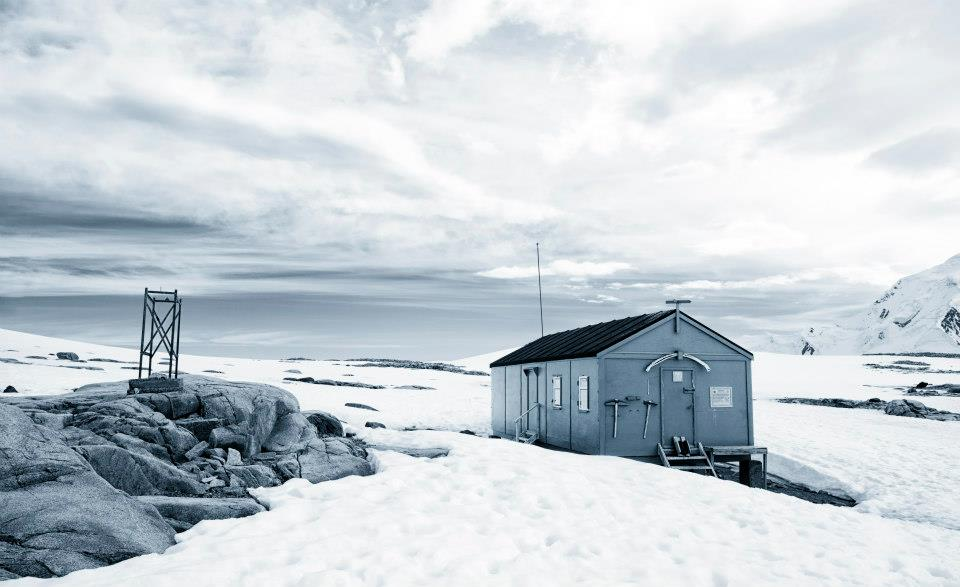
- Damoy Point Hut

- Location of Damoy Point Hut in Antarctic Peninsula
- Coordinates: 64°49′04″S 63°30′15″W
- Continent: Antarctica
- Location in Antarctic Peninsula: Damoy Point; Port Lockroy; Palmer Archipelago; Antarctica
- Administered by: British Antarctic Survey
- Established: 1973
- Type: Seasonal
- Status: Operational

Damoy Point is a headland 900 metres (980 yd) west-northwest of Flag Point, the northern entrance point to the harbour of Port Lockroy, on the western side of Wiencke Island in the Palmer Archipelago of Antarctica. It was discovered and named by the French Antarctic Expedition, 1903–05, under Jean-Baptiste Charcot.

== Damoy Point Hut ==
A well-preserved hut containing scientific equipment and other artifacts stands at the point. It was built in 1973 and used for several years as a British summer air facility and transit station for scientific personnel. It was last occupied in 1993. It has been designated a Historic Site or Monument (HSM 84), following a proposal by the United Kingdom to the Antarctic Treaty Consultative Meeting.

Since 2009, the hut has been managed by the UK Antarctic Heritage Trust, a British charity responsible for managing six historic huts on the Antarctic Peninsula. In 2023, Damoy Hut was repainted in its original bright orange after a conservation team spent nearly four weeks camping and working on the continent.

== See also ==
- List of Antarctic field camps
