= United Kingdom Antarctic Heritage Trust =

British charity

- Abbreviation: UKAHT
- Legal status: Charity
- Board of directors: Patron: Princess Anne, The Princess Royal; Chief Executive: Camilla Nichol
- Website: www.ukaht.org

The United Kingdom Antarctic Heritage Trust (UKAHT) is a British charity, registered in 1993 and re-registered in 2015. The UKAHT is a member of the Antarctic Heritage Trust coalition. The UKAHT's Patron is Princess Anne, The Princess Royal.

The organisation's stated goals include:

- Help conserve selected early British scientific bases on the Antarctic Peninsula and South Georgia region for the enjoyment and education of visitors. The UKAHT operates Port Lockroy, which is designated Historic Site and Monument (No. 61) under the Antarctic Treaty.
- Protect and preserve six other historic bases along the Antarctic Peninsula.
- Oversee the Conservation Management Plan (CMP) for the shipwreck of Ernest Shackleton's Endurance
- Develop and promote an educational programme to stimulate public interest in science, the global environment and Antarctic research through the inspiration of earlier British Antarctic endeavours.
- Digitally document and virtually reconstruct all ex-British bases along the Antarctic Peninsula using 3D models, photogrammetry and laser scanning.
- Support the New Zealand Antarctic Heritage Trust in conserving the historic huts in the Ross Sea area built by the explorers Scott, Shackleton and Borchgrevink.
- Help with the acquisition and preservation of British historical Antarctic artefacts.

== Projects ==
Port Lockroy (Historic Site No. 61 under the Antarctic Treaty) is operated as a museum and post office (on behalf of the Foreign and Commonwealth Office) by UK Antarctic Heritage Trust during the austral summer. Proceeds from the gift shop fund the repair and conservation of this site and others on the Antarctic Peninsula.

In 2023, UKAHT restored Damoy Hut, Antarctica's only protected historic transit facility and skiway, to its original orange. A small field team which included conservation carpenters camped on the island for 26 days making repairs and repainting the hut.

In 2024, UKAHT developed and published the Conservation Management Plan (CMP) in collaboration with Historic England for the shipwreck of Endurance after it was found in 2022. Key guidance published in the CMP included preserving the wreck in situ, extending the protected zone and giving the site protected status under the Antarctic Treaty System. UKAHT also launched an independent dedicated partner site, enduranceshipwreck.org which contains full details of the Conservation Management Plan was submitted to the Antarctic Treaty Consultative Meeting in May 2024.

In 2025, UKAHT are sending a small team to restore Blaiklock Island Refuge, a tiny hut in Marguerite Bay. Blaiklock Island Refuge is ex-sledging refuge used by parties sledging other Antarctic bases including Base Y, Horseshoe Island; Base W, Detaille Island; and Base E, Stonington Island. Blaiklock is a part Historic Site and Monument (HSM) No. 63 Base Y, Horseshoe Island. Both have been under UKAHT's care since 2014.

- McGourty, Christine (2001-12-17). "Princess on Antarctic mission". BBC News.
- Bryson, Bill, Sir Neil Cossons, Sir Ranulph Fiennes, Philippa Foster Back, Lady Scott, the Hon Alexandra Shackleton, Lord Smith of Finsbury (2006-05-15). "Antarctic huts at risk". The Times.
- Jenkins, Simon (2006-04-28). "A corner of Antarctica that will be for ever Britain, no matter the cost". The Guardian.
- "British Antarctic Survey: Port Lockroy Station ", Natural Environment Research Council, Retrieved 2010-April-25
- "UK Antarctic Heritage Trust web site ", Retrieved 2010-April-25
