= Filla Island =

Island of Antarctica

- Location within Antarctica

Geography
- Location: Princess Elizabeth Land, Antarctica
- Coordinates: 68°49′S 77°50′E
- Archipelago: Rauer Islands
- Length: 5.5 km (3.42 mi)
- Width: 2.8 km (1.74 mi)

Administration
- Administered under the Antarctic Treaty System

Demographics
- Population: Uninhabited

Filla Island is a rocky island about 5.5 kilometres (3.4 mi) long, located in the northern part of the Rauer Islands and being the largest island in the group. It was charted by Norwegian cartographers from air photos taken by the Lars Christensen Expedition (1936–37). They gave the name Filla (the tatters) to a larger island here, presumably for the ragged outline of the feature as shown on the Norwegian chart. In 1952, John Roscoe made a study of this area as revealed in aerial photographs taken by U.S. Navy Operation Highjump (1946–47). He found that what the Norwegians had named Filla was in fact a cluster of small islands. He applied the name Filla Island to the largest of these as described.

== Important Bird Area ==
A 102 ha site on the island has been designated an Important Bird Area (IBA) by BirdLife International because it supports a breeding colony of about 28,000 Adélie penguins.

== See also ==
- List of antarctic and sub-antarctic islands
