= Rauer Islands =

Group of islands in Prydz Bay, Antarctica

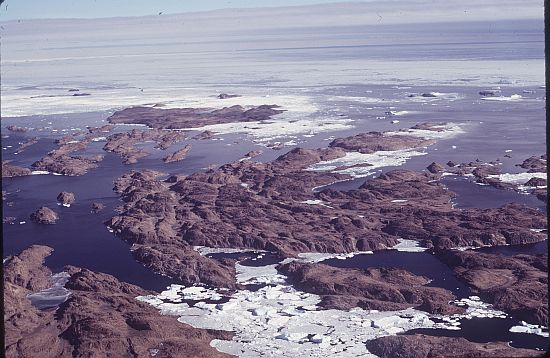
Rauer Islands, 1974, Australian Antarctic Division

The Rauer Islands (68°51′S 77°50′E) are a group of rocky coastal islands which lie between Sorsdal Glacier Tongue and Ranvik Bay, in the southeast part of Prydz Bay. Discovered and roughly charted in February 1935 by a Norwegian expedition under Captain Klarius Mikkelsen (see Caroline Mikkelsen). He named them Rauer, probably after the island lying in Oslofjorden opposite Tønsberg, Norway.

== See also ==
- List of antarctic and sub-antarctic islands
