= List of disasters in Antarctica by death toll =

The following is a list of known disasters in Antarctica which have resulted in fatalities. It includes disasters which happened on land, as well as in the waters surrounding the continent.

== Table ==
Year	Type	Fatalities	Incident	Location	Comments
1819	Shipwreck	644	San Telmo (Spanish ship)	Drake Passage, Southern Ocean	
1979	Aircraft	257	Air New Zealand Flight 901	Mount Erebus, Ross Island, Antarctica	
2019	Aircraft	38	2019 Chilean Air Force C-130 crash	Drake Passage, Antarctica	Aircraft lost en route from Chile to Teniente R. Marsh Airport, King George Island
2010	Shipwreck	22	South Korean trawler Insung	Ross Sea, near the McMurdo Station	5 confirmed dead, 17 missing and presumed dead
1976	Aircraft	11	Livingston Island plane crash	Livingston Island, Antarctica	
1985	Aircraft	10	Nelson Island plane crash	Nelson Island, Antarctica	
1960	Fire (building)	8	Mirny Station fire	Mirny Station, Antarctica	
1823	Shipwreck	7	Jenny	Drake Passage, Southern Ocean	Most likely a legend
1958	Aircraft	7	Cape Hallett Bay plane crash	Cape Hallett Bay, Antarctica	6 survivors
1966	Aircraft	6	Ross Ice Shelf plane crash	Ross Ice Shelf, Antarctica	
1986	Aircraft	6	Philippi Glacier plane crash	Philippi Glacier, Antarctica	
1961	Aircraft	5	Wilkes Station plane crash	Wilkes Station, Antarctica	
1956	Aircraft	4	McMurdo Station plane crash	McMurdo Station, Antarctica	4 survivors
1994	Aircraft	4	Rothera Research Station plane crash	near the Rothera Research Station, Antarctica	
2010	Aircraft	4	Terre Adélie helicopter crash	near the Dumont d'Urville Station, Terre Adélie, Antarctica	
1946	Aircraft	3	Antarctica PBM Mariner crash	Thurston Island, Antarctica	6 survivors
1958	Aircraft	3	Marguerite Bay plane crash	Marguerite Bay, Antarctica	4 survivors
1965	Tractor	3	Tractor falls into crevasse	Milorgknausane nunataks, Queen Maud Land, Antarctica	
1979	Aircraft	3	Molodezhnaya Ice Station plane crash	near Molodezhnaya Ice Station, Antarctica	11 survivors
1989	Aircraft	3	Mirny Station plane crash	Mirny Station, Antarctica	
1999	Aircraft	3	Terre Adélie helicopter crash	near the Dumont d'Urville Station, Terre Adélie, Antarctica	
2013	Aircraft	3	Mount Elizabeth plane crash	Mount Elizabeth, Antarctica	
2012	Shipwreck	3	Jeong Woo 2 (South Korean fishing vessel)	Ross Sea, near the McMurdo Station	3 missing were presumed dead, 7 burn injuries, 2 serious
1929	Aircraft	2	Whaler scouting flight crash	west of Scott Island, Antarctica	
1948	Fire (building)	2	Hope Bay fire	Base D, Hope Bay, Graham Land, Antarctica	1 survivor
1959	Aircraft	2	Marble Point plane crash	Marble Point, Antarctica	3 survivors
1969	Aircraft	2	Mount McLennan helicopter crash	Taylor Valley, Antarctica	6 survivors
1987	Aircraft	2	D-59 plane crash	1390 km northwest of McMurdo Sound, Antarctica	11 survivors
2008	Aircraft	2	Neumayer Station II helicopter crash	near Neumayer Station II, Antarctica	3 survivors
2012	Fire (building)	2	Comandante Ferraz Antarctic Station fire	Comandante Ferraz Antarctic Base, Antarctica	1 minor burn injury
2018	Work accident	2	2018 McMurdo mishap	McMurdo Station, Antarctica	Two contractors asphyxiated maintaining fire suppression system
2003	Attack by a Leopard Seal	1	Snorkeling scientist dragged underwater by a Leopard Seal and drowned. (Note: See also: Leopard seal- Relationship with humans)	Rothera Research Station, Adelaide Island, Antarctica	
2008	Fire (building)	1	Progress Station fire	Progress Station, Antarctica	2 serious burn injuries
2016	Snowmobile	1	McMurdo Shear Zone Accident	McMurdo Shear Zone, Antarctica	
2016	Aircraft	1	Pilot crevasse fatality unloading sling	Davis Station, Antarctica	
2022	Rogue wave	1	Viking Polaris cruise ship	Drake Passage, Southern Ocean	4 injuries

== See also ==
- List of disasters in Australia by death toll
- List of disasters in Canada by death toll
- List of disasters in Croatia by death toll
- List of disasters in Great Britain and Ireland by death toll
- List of disasters in New Zealand by death toll
- List of disasters in Poland by death toll
- List of disasters in the United States by death toll
