= Brazilian Antarctica =

Brazilian Antarctica Antártica Brasileira (Portuguese)
- Zone of interest
- Coordinates: 28°W 53°W

Brazilian Antarctica (Portuguese: Antártida Brasileira or Antártica Brasileira) is the Antarctic territory south of 60°S, and from 28°W to 53°W, proposed as a "zone of interest" by geopolitical scholar Therezinha de Castro. It would comprise part of Coats Land, Berkner Island and much of the Weddell Sea and its ice shelf, for a total land area of around 400,000 square kilometers, overlapping the Argentine and British claims and bordering the Chilean claim. The country formally expressed its reservations with respect to its territorial rights in Antarctica when it acceded to the Antarctic Treaty on 16 May 1975, making the first official mention of the Frontage Theory, which states (simplified) that sovereignty over each point in Antarctica properly (bar the South Pole itself) belongs to the first country whose non-Antarctic territory one would reach when travelling north in a straight line from such a point.

Outside the zone of interest, Brazil maintains a permanently staffed research facility, the Comandante Ferraz Brazilian Antarctic Base (UN/LOCODE: AQ-CFZ), located in Admiralty Bay, King George Island, near the tip of the Antarctic Peninsula, at 62°08′S 58°40′W. The peninsula is the northernmost, most accessible, and warmest part of the Antarctic continent and a number of countries, therefore, have research bases located on it.

At the time of the earliest Brazilian Antarctic expeditions in the early 1980s, there were calls to install a research facility in the zone defined by the frontage theory. Practical reasons prevailed for a location in the Antarctic Peninsula, outside of the zone. The Navy was unprepared to operate in the Weddell Sea and, together with the Ministry of Foreign Affairs, favored a pragmatic approach over the Army's territorialist concern for operations in the zone. A 1980 report by the Armed Forces General Staff advised an avoidance of "sterile discussions" over frontage theory, noting its expansionist undertones brought unneeded tension with Argentina. The priority was to be integration into the Antarctic Treaty.

Maps depicting a Brazilian claim in Antarctica were used in some public schools in the 1960s. As late as 2009, some articles on Wikipedia mistakenly claimed Brazil has or intends to have an Antarctic territorial claim.

== See also ==
- Brazilian Antarctic Program
