= Brazilian research ship Almirante Saldanha =

Brazilian Navy icebreaker

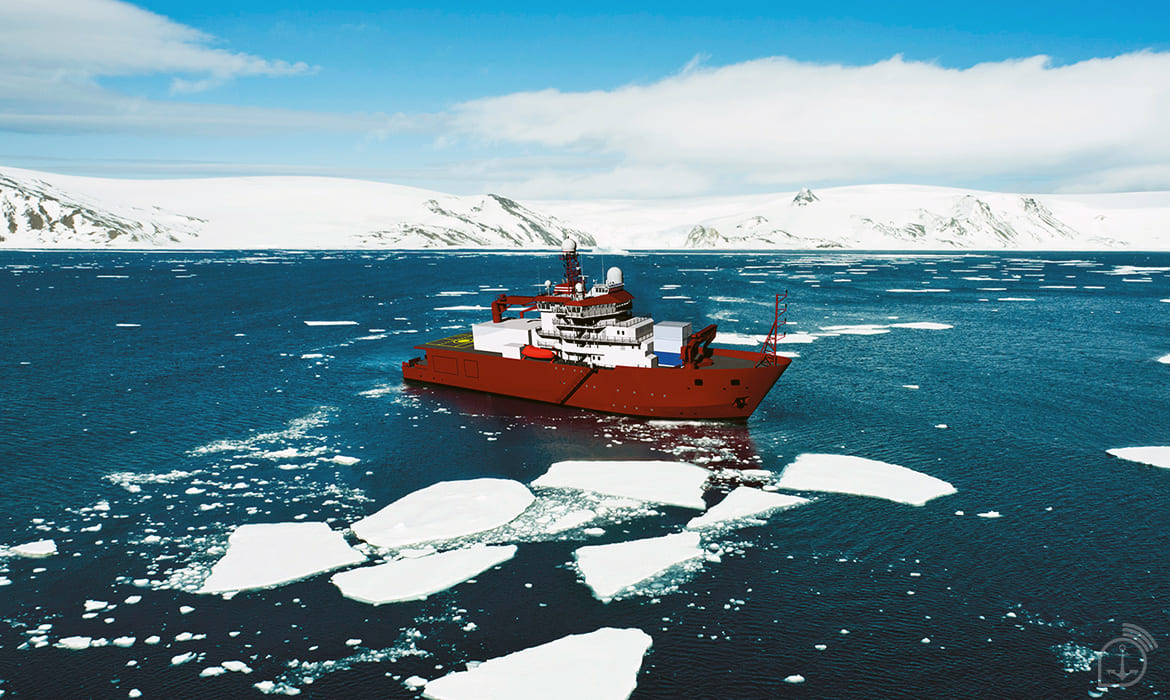
- Artist's impression of the vessel

History

Brazil
- Name: Almirante Saldanha
- Namesake: Saldanha da Gama
- Ordered: June 2022
- Builder: Jurong Aracruz (Aracruz, Brazil)
- Cost: $150 million
- Laid down: 17 October 2023
- Launched: 2025 (planned)
- Identification: H22; IMO number: 4772039
- Status: Under construction

General characteristics
- Type: Research vessel
- Tonnage: 6,080 GT; 1,540 DWT
- Displacement: 6,808 t (6,700 long tons)
- Length: 103 m (337 ft 11 in)
- Beam: 18.5 m (60 ft 8 in)
- Draft: 6.3 m (20 ft 8 in)
- Ice class: Polar Class 6
- Installed power: Three Wärtsilä 32 series diesel generators
- Propulsion: Diesel-electric; two azimuth thrusters
- Speed: 15 knots (28 km/h; 17 mph) (maximum); 12.6 knots (23.3 km/h; 14.5 mph) (cruise)
- Range: 10,000 nautical miles (19,000 km; 12,000 mi)
- Endurance: 70 days
- Complement: 95, including 26 researchers
- Aircraft carried: Airbus H135 helicopter
- Aviation facilities: Helipad

Almirante Saldanha (H22) is a Brazilian Navy ice-strengthened oceanographic research ship under construction by the Brazilian shipyard Jurong Aracruz. The vessel will replace the aging Ary Rongel (H44) as the main ship of the Brazilian Antarctic Program. The launching of the ship was planned for 2025.
