= Comandante Ferraz Antarctic Station fire =

2012 fire in Antarctica

- Date: February 25, 2012
- Location: King George Island, Antarctica; Maps 62.0865°S 58.3932°W
- Type: Fire
- Deaths: 2
- Injuries: 1
- Property damage: 70% of the research station

The Comandante Ferraz Antarctic Station fire was a fire at the Comandante Ferraz Antarctic Station in Antarctica, on 25 February 2012 that killed 2 people and injured another. The fire destroyed approximately 70% of the research station.

== Cause ==
The fire broke out in the machine room housing the power generators at approximately 2:00 am (Brasília time) on 25 February 2012. The Brazilian Navy opened an investigation to determine the exact cause of the accident. An initial report by the Ministry of Defense suggests that a short circuit might have triggered the explosion.

== International effort ==
- Chile's Frei Montalva was the first base to receive the distress signal sent by the Brazilian station at 02:40 am (local time). The Chilean Navy activated an emergency plan, sending two boats with firefighting crew to the scene, in addition to equipment and supplies, such as pumps, hoses and extinguishers. The Chilean help arrived at 3:46 am (local time) after sailing for 1 hour. A third ship, tugboat Lautaro, arrived at 05:00 am (local time). At daylight, the Chilean Navy sent two Bolkow helicopters to evacuate the Brazilian personnel back to Frei Montalva base.
- Argentina responded by sending the Argentine Navy vessel Puerto Deseado and crew to the scene. The Argentine Air Force later transported the Brazilian personnel from the Chilean base to Punta Arenas, Chile.
- Poland's Arctowski Station also sent staff to support the firefighting efforts. Polish medics administered first aid to the Brazilian soldier injured in the fire.
- United Kingdom's ice patrol ship HMS Protector received the distress call from Comandante Ferraz Antarctic Station and sailed to King George Island to provide assistance to the research station. 23 of her sailors were put ashore with fire-fighting equipment to tackle the large blaze.

== Evacuation ==
Fifty-nine people were at the station when the fire broke out. Forty-four people (30 scientists, an alpinist, a representative from the Ministry of Environment and 12 soldiers from the Arsenal de Marinha do Rio de Janeiro) were evacuated by helicopter to the nearby Chilean Eduardo Frei Montalva Station, while 12 Brazilian Navy soldiers stayed at the base trying to fight the blaze.

The evacuees were later embarked in an Argentine Air Force flight to Punta Arenas, Chile. The Brazilian Air Force sent a C-130 Hercules aircraft to pick up the 44 evacuees and transport them back to Brazil.

== Casualties and injuries ==
Two soldiers, sub-officer Carlos Alberto Vieira Figueiredo and sergeant Roberto Lopes dos Santos, originally reported as missing by the Brazilian Navy, were found dead in the debris of the station after the fire. Their remains were flown back home on 28 February 2012. They received honors in a military funeral held at the Galeão Air Force Base.

Sergeant Luciano Gomes Medeiros suffered non-life-threatening injuries and received first aid treatment at the Arctowski Antarctic Station.

== Damage ==
On 26 February 2012, the Brazilian Navy issued a press release with a preliminary report of the extent of the damages. According to the report, although roughly 70% of the station was destroyed by the fire; the shelters, several laboratories (of meteorology, chemistry and atmospheric sciences), the fuel tanks and the heliport remained intact, as they were isolated from the main building.

== Reactions ==
=== Governmental response ===
President Rousseff issued a statement where she expressed her consternation over the accident and the death of the two Brazilian Navy soldiers and reiterated her "strong commitment to the full reconstruction of the Comandante Ferraz Antarctic Station". The Ministry of Defense announced that reconstruction plans would commence on 27 February 2012. The Brazilian government estimated that it will take about two years to rebuild the station.

=== International media ===
The accident received considerable coverage by the international media. In South America, Chilean and Argentine newspapers stressed the help of their respective countries in the evacuation effort. The Chilean newspaper La Nación quoted the call made by President Rousseff to the President of Chile, Sebastián Piñera, to acknowledge the support "in the relief and rescue" of those affected by the fire. The daily La Prensa Austral devoted an entire front page to the disaster. In Argentina, La Nación published an extensive story explaining the location of the Brazilian station and how the Argentine armed forces participated in the rescue. Clarín also stressed the aid of the country to Brazil. The reconstruction of the station and the solidarity with Brazil were also quoted by the Spanish El País, the Portuguese Público and the American The Washington Post.

== See also ==
- List of Antarctica disasters by death toll
- Brazilian Antarctic Program
- Firefighting in Antarctica
