= Luís Antônio de Carvalho Ferraz =

Antarctica explorer (1940–1982)

- Born: 21 February 1940; São Luís, Brazil
- Died: 11 August 1982 (aged 42); Halifax, Canada
- Military career
- Allegiance: Brazil
- Branch: Brazilian Navy
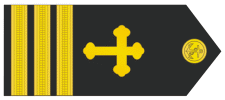
- Rank: Frigate captain
- Nickname: Comandante Ferraz

Luís Antônio de Carvalho Ferraz (21 February 1940 – 11 August 1982) was a Brazilian Navy officer, engineer, hydrographer, oceanographer, and Brazilian pioneer in Antarctica.

Ferraz, a Brazilian Navy commander, made two expeditions to the Antarctic continent aboard British vessels. His first expedition took place in 1975, as a crew member of the RRS Bransfield and HMS Endurance. Ferraz was instrumental in persuading the Brazilian government in creating the Brazilian Antarctic Program.

Ferraz died on 11 August 1982, at the age of 42, while he attended an oceanographic conference in Halifax, Canada, just months before the first official Brazilian expedition to the Antarctic took place. In recognition of the important role he played in Brazil's Antarctic program, the Brazilian base in Antarctica was named after him: Comandante Ferraz Brazilian Antarctic Base.
