= Firefighting in Antarctica =

Fighting fires on the continent of Antarctica

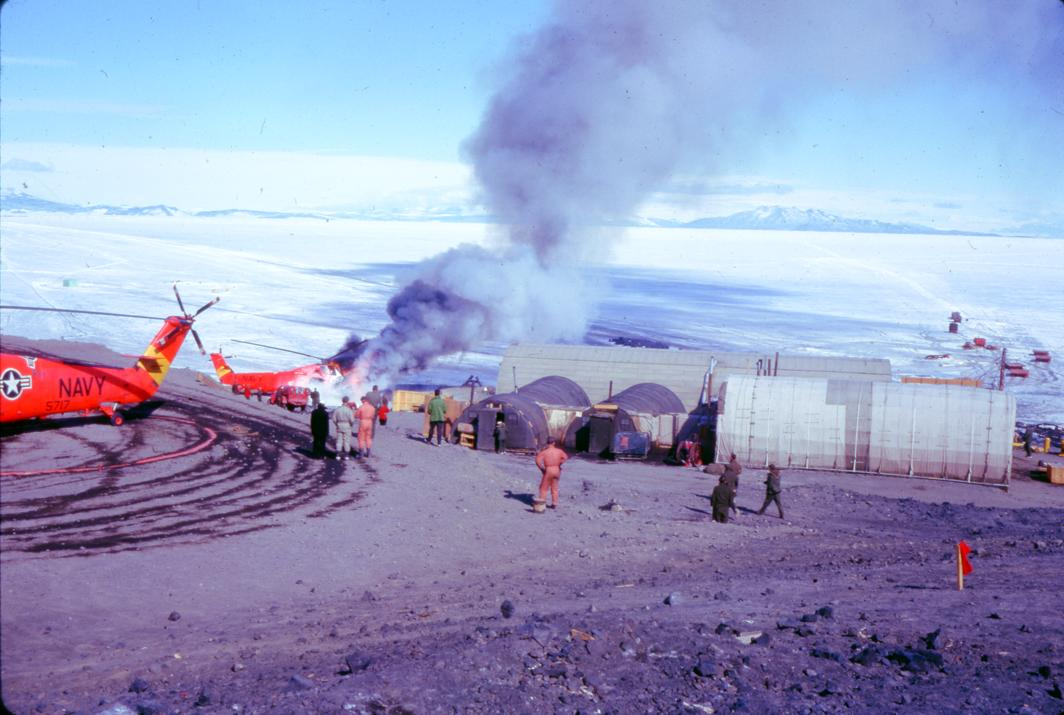
A US Navy helicopter on fire at McMurdo Station in 1962

Firefighting in Antarctica encompasses various organizations and procedures designed to fight fires on the continent of Antarctica. Firefighting in Antarctica is complicated by the harsh conditions of the continent, the remoteness of the locations to be serviced, and the importance of protecting life-supporting shelter from immolation.

== Conditions and considerations ==
Although there are no wildfires in Antarctica, fire represents a serious threat to human activity. Antarctica is the windiest place on earth, so there are often winds sufficient to quickly fan any flames. Due to the low temperatures, liquid water is often hard to obtain in large quantities.

Because of the harsh conditions, fire damage to shelter could be disastrous to the survival of a base's residents, exacerbated by the remoteness of the bases from outside aid. Because of this, bases in Antarctica are often designed to mitigate the devastation of a fire by being made up of a number of separate buildings with a significant distance between them.

In addition, many Antarctic bases have emergency supplies stored near to the base, but far enough away that even a large fire will not immolate them. If the base burns, the supplies are intended to be sufficient for base personnel to survive until help can arrive.

== Antarctic Fire Department ==
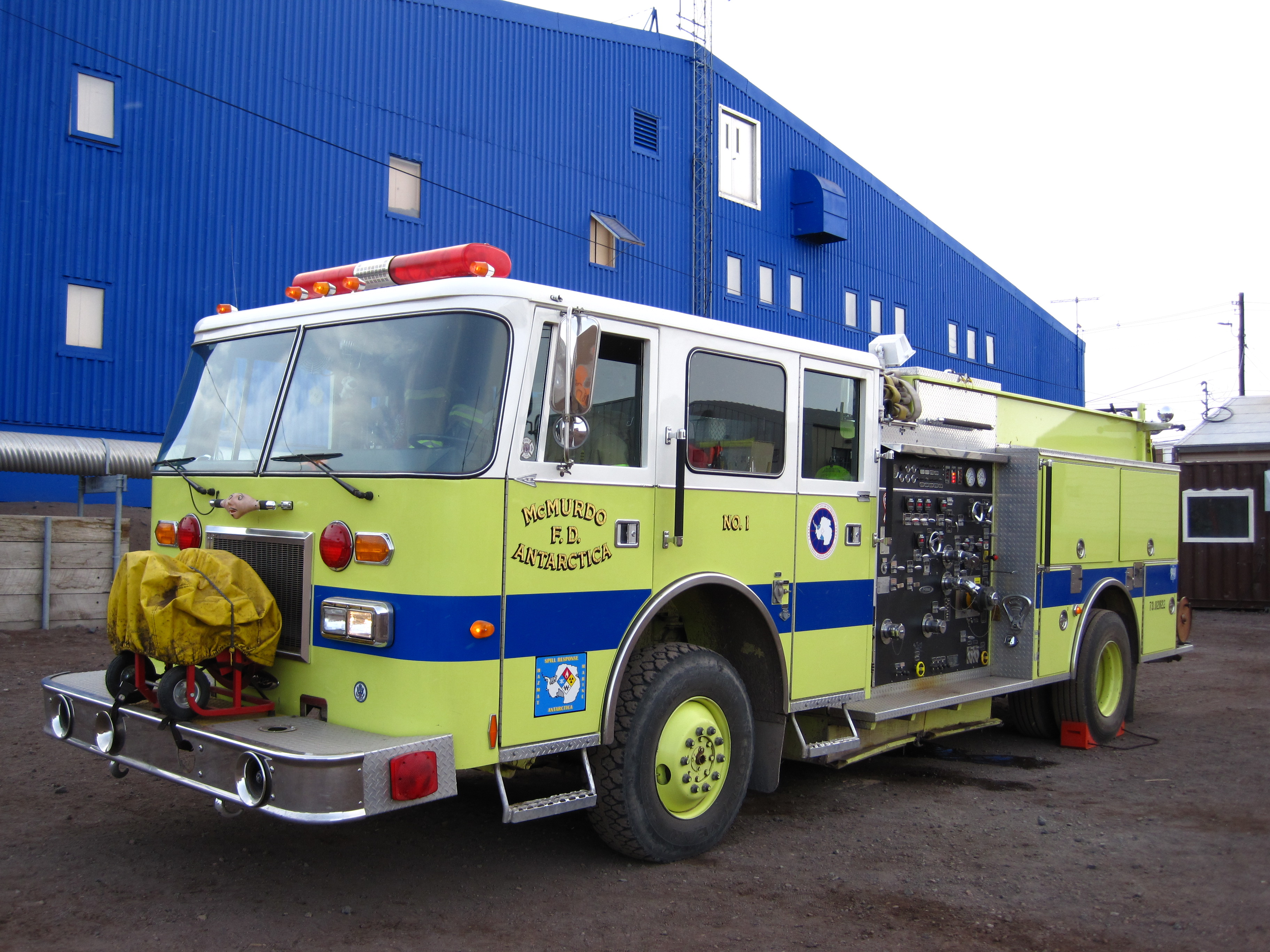
Antarctic fire truck

The Antarctic Fire Department is based at McMurdo Station. It is the only full-time professional fire department in Antarctica, and the largest and best equipped.

The department maintains two fire stations at McMurdo, Station 1 and Station 2. Station 1 is located in central McMurdo and operates in the urban center of the base and is the AFD's headquarters. Station 2 is located at McMurdo International Airport and serves the station's airfields, Phoenix Airfield, Williams Field and the Ice Runway. As of 2025, the Station 1 fleet consisted of two fire engines, a water tender, an ambulance, a rescue vehicle, and a SCAT (Self Contained Attack Truck) firefighting vehicle. The Station 2 fleet consisted of an ambulance and seven ARFF (Aircraft Rescue Fire Fighting) vehicles, which are fully tracked to handle the deeper snowcover that surrounds the runways. Station 2 apparatus is distributed and dispatched to different airfields depending on the current flight activity.

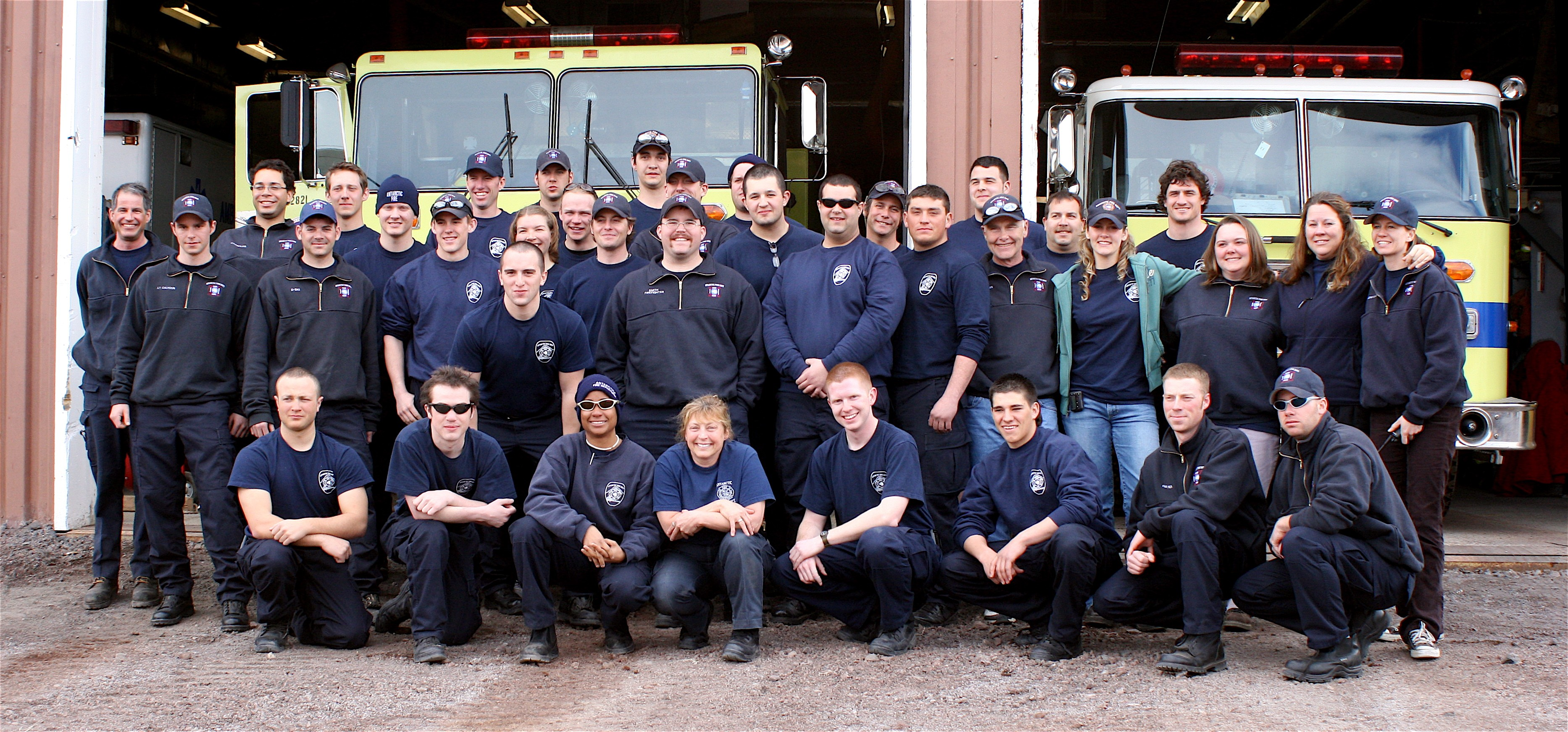
Antarctic Fire Department personnel, December 2006

During the Antarctic summer (October–February), McMurdo's population is at its highest with between 1,200 and 1,400 people living there. During this time, as of 2025, the Antarctic Fire Department maintains a staff of about 55, split between Station 1, Station 2, and Station 3 at the South Pole (see below). In the winter (February–August), McMurdo's resident population declines about 200 or less and the Antarctic Fire Department staffing decreases to a much smaller complement.

As well as fires and fire alarms, the department handles medical calls, hazmat spills, odor investigations, assists, dive emergencies, and other tasks as needed (including herding seals and penguins off runways for incoming flights). Department dispatchers monitor all off-base foot travel, and all off-base vehicle movements during extreme weather.

== Southernmost Fire Department ==
The Southernmost Fire Department serves the American South Pole Station.

Firefighting at South Pole Station was long the responsibility of a volunteer fire brigade, staffed by station personnel who received one week of training. In the twenty-first century, a professional contingent of a few firefighters of the Antarctic Fire Department, designated as Station 3, was added to the station for the summer months. Because of the cold climate and scarcity of liquid water, they typically use dry chemicals and foam to extinguish fires..

== Other fire departments ==
Other research stations in Antarctica, such as Vostok Station (Russia), Scott Base (New Zealand), and Terra Nova Station (Italy) are protected by part-time fire brigades.

== Fires in Antarctica ==
The first known fire in Antarctica was during the British Southern Cross Expedition of 1898–1900, when a candle set fire to a hut and nearly burned it down, which would have been disastrous to the expedition.

The British Hope Bay Station was completely destroyed by fire in 1948. Two of the three staff were killed, the lone survivor lived alone in a tent for sixteen days until rescued.

On August 3, 1960, a fire whipped by strong winds struck the Soviet Mirny Station, killing eight. Another fire on June 21, 2020 there damaged several labs, but no one was injured.

On April 12, 1984, the Argentine leader of the Almirante Brown Base burned the entire base down on purpose to avoid having to stay the winter. There were no injuries and personnel were evacuated by a United States Navy ship.

The Comandante Ferraz Antarctic Station fire at Brazil's Comandante Ferraz Antarctic Station on February 25, 2012, destroyed much of the station, and materials and equipment used for research. Two people were killed and another injured.

On October 5, 2008, a building at the Russian Progress Station burned down, with one person being killed and two seriously injured, and radio contact with the outside world being lost for a few days.
