= Therezinha de Castro =

Brazilian geopolitician

Therezinha de Castro (December 22, 1930 – February 16, 2000) was a Brazilian historian, geopolitician, and professor. She is best known for developing the concept of Brazilian Antarctica within her Theory of Defrontation, which was presented in the thesis Antártica: Teoria da Defrontação and elaborated in the books Rumo à Antártica (1976) and Geopolítica: princípios, meios e fins (1999).

== Biography ==
Born in Rio de Janeiro, Castro was the daughter of the Army General Fábio de Castro. She spent part of her childhood in Rio Grande do Sul before returning to her home city, where she studied history and geography at the National Faculty of Philosophy. In 1952, she joined the Brazilian Institute of Geography and Statistics (IBGE), where she became a disciple of the geographer Delgado de Carvalho. In the 1960s, while teaching at the traditional Colégio Pedro II, she authored didactic works, such as the Atlas de Relações Internacionais and the two-volume collection História Geral.

Around that time, she was appointed as a professor at the Escola Superior de Guerra, an institute of higher studies specializing on national security, military science, and geopolitics, functioning within Brazil's Ministry of Defence. She later lectured at the Escola de Comando e Estado-Maior do Exército, the Escola de Guerra Naval, and the Escola de Aperfeiçoamento de Oficiais.

Alongside Carlos de Meira Mattos and Golbery do Couto e Silva, Castro was one of the most influential Brazilian geopolitical thinkers of the late 20th-century, and together with Bertha Becker, she became a reference in the political and geographical study of the Amazon Rainforest. Her works contributed to the development of the Brazilian Antarctic Program. In 1997, Castro received the Order of Military Merit.

== Works ==
- Atlas de Relações Internacionais (1960)
- Leituras Geográficas (1965)
- Geografia Humana – Política e Economia (1967)
- História Geral: Antiga e Medieval (1968)
- História Geral: Moderna e Contemporânea (1970)
- Rumo à Antártica (1976)
- História Documental do Brasil (1980)
- África: Geohistória, Geopolítica e Relações Internacionais (1981)
- Atlas-texto de Geopolítica do Brasil (1981)
- O Brasil no Mundo Atual - Posicionamento e Diretrizes (1982)
- Estudos de Geo-História (1982)
- História da Civilização Brasileira (1982)
- Brasil: da Amazónia ao Prata (1983)
- José Bonifácio e a Unidade Nacional (1984)
- Hipólito da Costa: ideias e ideais (1985)
- Retrato do Brasil (1986)
- Nossa América: Geopolítica comparada (1994)
- Ásia: Estudo sobre uma caracterização Geopolítica (1998)
- Rumo à Amazônia (1998)
- Geopolítica: princípios, meios e fins (1999)
