= Refuge Astronomer Cruls =

Refuge Astronomer Cruls Refúgio Astrônomo Cruls
- Antarctic station
- Location of Refuge Astronomer Cruls in Antarctica
- Coordinates: 62°14′34″S 58°58′51″W
- Country: Brazil
- Location in Antarctica: Nelson Island; South Shetland Islands; Antarctica
- Administered by: Brazilian Antarctic Program
- Established: 25 January 1985
- Elevation: 15 m (49 ft)

Population
  - Total: Up to 6
- Time zone: UTC-3 (BRT)
- Type: Seasonal
- Period: Summer
- Status: Operational
- Website: PROANTAR

Refuge Astronomer Cruls (Portuguese: Refúgio Astrônomo Cruls) is a Brazilian Antarctic summer facility named after astronomer Luis Cruls who set up an expedition in 1882 to Punta Arenas in order to observe the passage of Venus across the disk of the Sun. The structure, established on 25 January 1985, is situated on Nelson Island (South Shetland Islands), southwest of King George Island, South Shetland Islands, Antarctica.

The refuge, which can accommodate up to 6 scientists for up to 40 days, depends both logistically and administratively on Comandante Ferraz station. Together with Refuge Emílio Goeldi, located on Elephant Island, constitute the basic infra-structure to support the Brazilian Antarctic Program in Antarctica.

== See also ==
- List of Antarctic research stations
- List of Antarctic field camps
