= Refuge Pe. Balduino Rambo =

Refuge Pe. Balduino Rambo Refúgio Pe. Balduíno Rambo
- Research station
- Refuge Pe. Balduino Rambo, King George Island
- Coordinates: Maps 62.0953°S 58.5753°W
- Country: Brazil
- Established: 1985
- Dismantled: 2004

Population
  - Total: 6
- Time zone: UTC-3 (BRT)
- Website: www.mar.mil.br/secirm/proantar.htm

Refuge Pe. Balduino Rambo (Portuguese: Refúgio Pe. Balduíno Rambo) was a Brazilian Antarctic summer installation named after the botanist Father Balduíno Rambo. Located on King George Island, South Shetland Islands, Antarctica, it depended both logistically and administratively on Comandante Ferraz; it was dismantled in 2004.

Established in the summer of 1985, it could accommodate up to 6 scientists for up to 40 days.

== See also ==
- List of Antarctic research stations
- List of Antarctic field camps
- Brazilian Antarctic Program
