= Criosfera 1 =

Brazilian research module in Antartica

- Research module
- Location within Antarctica
- Coordinates: 84°00′S 79°30′W
- Country: Brazil
- Established: 12 January 2012
- Website: PROANTAR

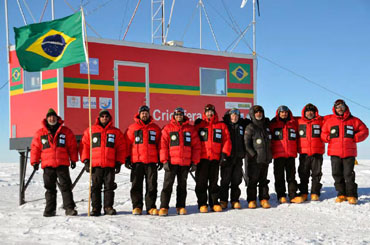
Opening of the Cryosphere

The Criosfera 1 is a Brazilian standalone research module for atmospheric data collection, prepared at the National Institute for Space Research (INPE) for the Brazilian Antarctic Program (PROANTAR).

== Location ==
Inaugurated on 12 January 2012, the module is located on the plateau of the western Antarctica ice sheet, at 84°00' S–79°30' W, 420 kilometres (260 mi) from the Union Glacier, 670 kilometres (420 mi) from the geographical South Pole, and 2,500 kilometres (1,600 mi) south of the Comandante Ferraz Brazilian Antarctic Base.

=== Expedition Criosfera 1 ===
The expedition for the placement of the module was coordinated by Universidade Federal do Rio Grande do Sul (UFRGS) through Professor Jefferson Cardia Simões, director of the Centro Polar e Climático (CPC). The Universidade Estadual do Rio de Janeiro (UERJ), was then represented by Professor Dr. Heitor Evangelista, responsible for the coordination of the project.

Measuring 6.3 metres (21 ft) long, 2.6 metres (8.5 ft) wide, 2.5 metres (8.2 ft) high, and weighing 3,500 kilograms (7,700 lb), it was built 1.5 metres (4.9 ft) above the ground to avoid snow accumulation and allow the wind to pass underneath. Among the scientific tasks developed by the staff are ice drilling, assembly and activation of the module, and the surveying of ice morphology and dynamics at the glacier.

== Climate ==
Climate data for Criosfera 1 (2014-2021)
Month	Jan	Feb	Mar	Apr	May	Jun	Jul	Aug	Sep	Oct	Nov	Dec	Year
Record high °C (°F)	−5.6 (21.9)	−11.6 (11.1)	−12.5 (9.5)	−19.7 (−3.5)	−23.3 (−9.9)	−21.5 (−6.7)	−23.6 (−10.5)	−21.4 (−6.5)	−20.9 (−5.6)	−19.2 (−2.6)	−10.6 (12.9)	−4.7 (23.5)	−4.7 (23.5)
Mean daily maximum °C (°F)	−13.6 (7.5)	−21.8 (−7.2)	−30.9 (−23.6)	−34.8 (−30.6)	−35 (−31)	−36.1 (−33.0)	−38.3 (−36.9)	−38.5 (−37.3)	−37.2 (−35.0)	−31.7 (−25.1)	−19.7 (−3.5)	−12.4 (9.7)	−29.2 (−20.5)
Daily mean °C (°F)	−15.9 (3.4)	−24 (−11)	−33.2 (−27.8)	−37.1 (−34.8)	−37.3 (−35.1)	−38.6 (−37.5)	−40.7 (−41.3)	−40.7 (−41.3)	−39.6 (−39.3)	−33.8 (−28.8)	−21.6 (−6.9)	−14.7 (5.5)	−31.4 (−24.6)
Mean daily minimum °C (°F)	−18.1 (−0.6)	−26.3 (−15.3)	−35.4 (−31.7)	−39.3 (−38.7)	−39.6 (−39.3)	−41.1 (−42.0)	−43.2 (−45.8)	−43 (−45)	−42 (−44)	−36 (−33)	−23.9 (−11.0)	−17 (1)	−33.7 (−28.8)
Record low °C (°F)	−25.6 (−14.1)	−37.8 (−36.0)	−44.9 (−48.8)	−49 (−56)	−47.7 (−53.9)	−51.3 (−60.3)	−53.1 (−63.6)	−52.3 (−62.1)	−52 (−62)	−45.1 (−49.2)	−39 (−38)	−23.5 (−10.3)	−53.2 (−63.8)

=== Objective ===
The first Brazilian fully automatic data-collecting scientific module placed inside the Antarctic continent is intended for data collection concerning the analysis on reflexes of the pollutants generated in South America and in Antarctica. Data will be sent via satellite directly to the computers of the national institute of spatial research (INPE).

== See also ==
- List of Antarctic research stations
- List of Antarctic field camps
