= Refuge Emílio Goeldi =

Refuge Emílio Goeldi Refúgio Emílio Goeldi
- Antarctic refuge
- Location of Refuge Emílio Goeldi in Antarctica
- Coordinates: 61°13′21″S 55°22′03″W
- Location in Antarctica: Elephant Island; South Shetland Islands; Antarctica
- Administered by: Brazilian Antarctic Program
- Established: 1988

Population
  - Total: Up to 6
- Time zone: UTC-3 (BRT)
- Type: Seasonal
- Period: Summer
- Status: Active
- Website: PROANTAR

Refuge Emílio Goeldi (Portuguese: Refúgio Emílio Goeldi) is a Brazilian Antarctic summer facility named after the Swiss-Brazilian naturalist and zoologist Émil Goeldi. Built in 1988, the structure is located on Elephant Island, South Shetland Islands, Antarctica.

The structure can accommodate up to six scientists for up to 40 days, and depends both logistically and administratively on Comandante Ferraz station. It and Refuge Astronomer Cruls, located on Nelson Island, constitute the basic infrastructure to support the Brazilian Antarctic Program in Antarctica.

== See also ==
- List of Antarctic research stations
- List of Antarctic field camps
- Refuge Astronomer Cruls
- Brazilian Antarctic Program
