= 2019 Chilean Air Force C-130 crash =

Aircraft accident in the Drake Passage

Coordinates: 58°35′S 65°54′W

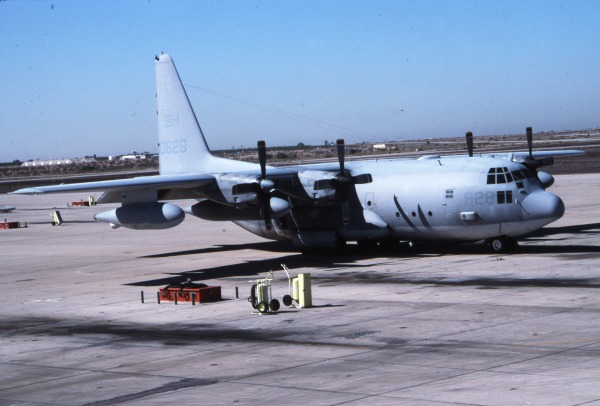
- The C-130 Hercules involved, taken in 1996 while operated by the USMC

Accident
- Date: 9 December 2019
- Summary: Crashed into the sea
- Site: Drake Passage

Aircraft
- Aircraft type: C-130 Hercules
- Operator: Chilean Air Force
- Registration: 990
- Flight origin: Arturo Merino Benítez International Airport, Santiago, Chile
- Stopover: Presidente Carlos Ibáñez del Campo International Airport, Punta Arenas, Patagonia, Chile
- Destination: Teniente Rodolfo Marsh Martin Air Base, Antarctica
- Occupants: 38
- Passengers: 21
- Crew: 17
- Fatalities: 38
- Survivors: 0

On 9 December 2019, a Chilean Air Force Lockheed C-130 Hercules military transport aircraft crashed in the Drake Passage while en route to Base Presidente Eduardo Frei Montalva, a Chilean military base on King George Island in Antarctica. The crash site was located on 12 December 2019 after a three-day search, and no survivors were found.

== Aircraft ==
The aircraft was built in 1978 for the United States Air Force with tail number 77-0324 and serial number 382-4776. It was delivered to the United States Marine Corps as a KC-130R tanker for aerial refueling operations and assigned BuNo 160628. It operated from Cherry Point, North Carolina (VMGR-252) and Iwakuni, Japan (VMGR-152).

The aircraft was placed in storage at the AMARG from 2009 until 2014, when it was acquired by the Chilean Air Force. After its purchase, it was refurbished at Hill AFB, Utah, to C-130H standards and delivered in 2015 under the new tail number 990.

== Accident ==
The aircraft departed Punta Arenas in Patagonia, Chile, at 19:55 UTC (16:55 local time) bound for King George Island, Antarctica. The flight was intended to provide supplies to a base in the Chilean Antarctic Territory and to bring personnel to inspect a floating fuel supply line and other equipment. The Chilean Air Force flies from Punta Arenas to King George Island monthly. Radio contact with the plane was lost at 21:13 UTC.

== Search ==
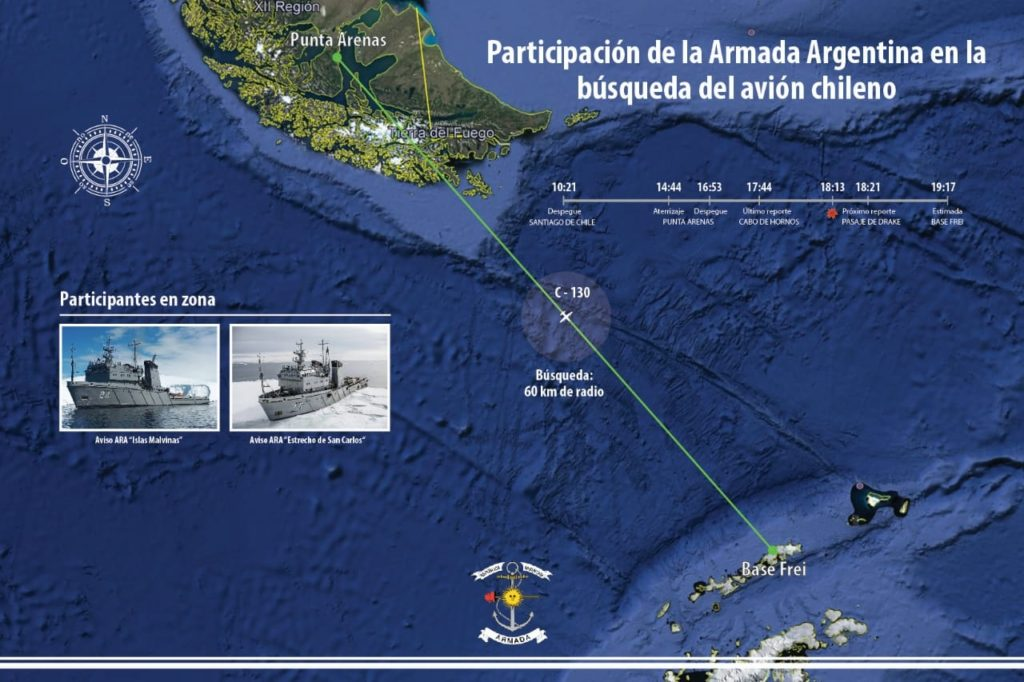
Map of the Argentine sea search effort

The closest, at 11 nautical miles (13 mi; 20 km), to the point where the plane disappeared from the radar was MV Hondius, an ocean expedition cruise ship. After hearing of the emergency, the owner immediately made the vessel available to the Chilean authorities while both passengers and crew assisted in observing the ocean for any sightings during the first hours. A search was conducted by aircraft from the Chilean Air Force, Argentina, Brazil, the United Kingdom, the United States, and Uruguay. Search and rescue aircraft included a US Navy P-8A Poseidon from Patrol Squadron FOUR and several Chilean F-16 Fighting Falcons. Two Chilean Navy frigates also searched the area where the aircraft was last observed by radar. They were aided by a team of satellite imagery analysts from the Israel Defense Forces' Unit 9900. The search effort was hampered by rough seas and poor visibility.

== Crash site ==
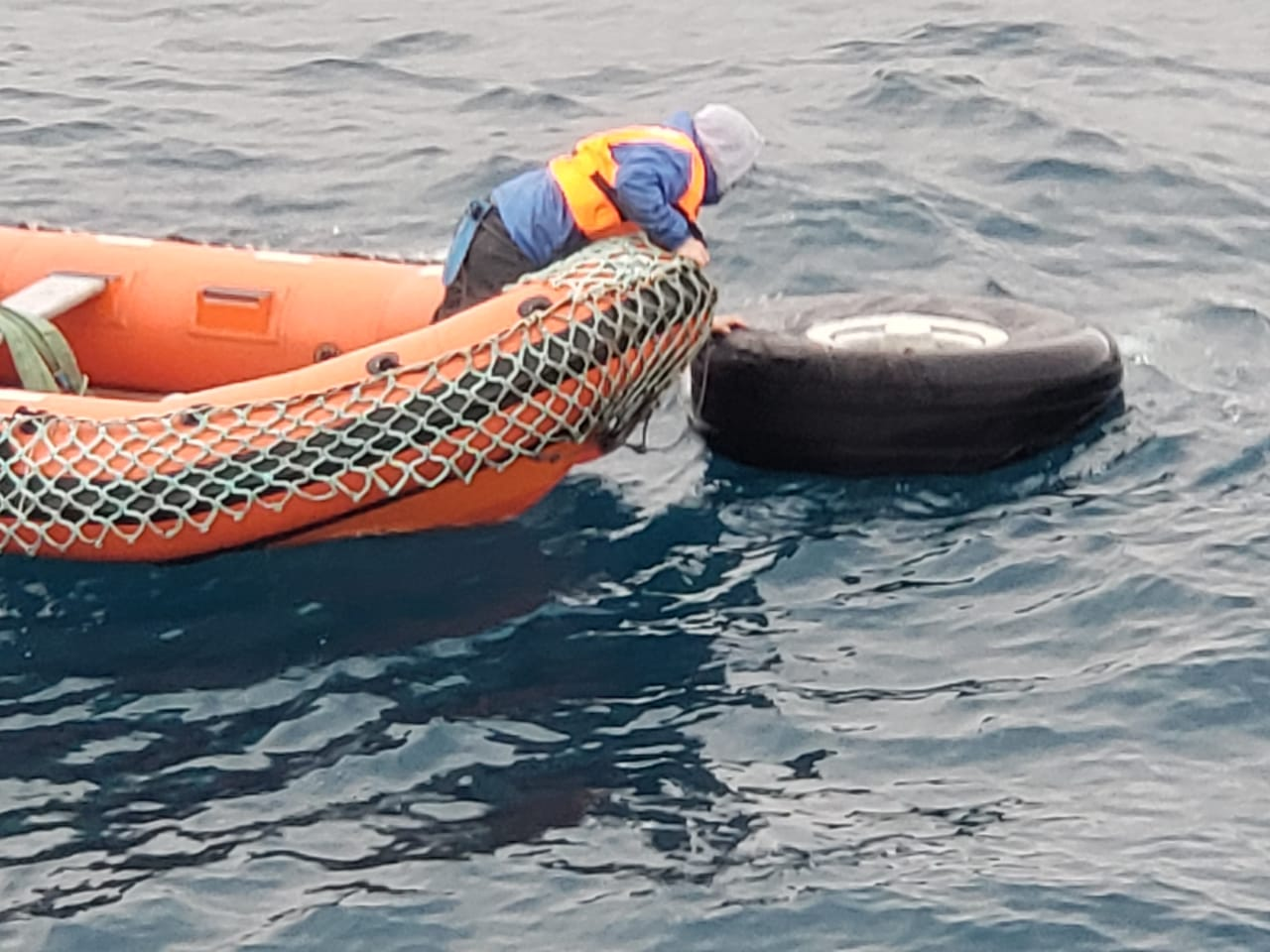
Recovered wreckage of aircraft 990

One day into the search, debris from an aircraft was found floating in the sea 31 kilometres (19 mi) from the last known position of the missing aircraft. Debris and personal items were recovered by the Brazilian Navy polar research ship Almirante Maximiano.

The crash site was located off the coast of South America on 12 December, 27 kilometres (17 mi) from the C-130's last known position. The aircraft fuselage and main components were identified, along with human remains. Chilean Air Force chief Arturo Merino confirmed that everyone on board had been killed.

== Passengers and crew ==
The aircraft was carrying 38 people: 21 passengers and 17 crew members. Fifteen passengers were Chilean Air Force servicemen, three were Chilean soldiers, two were civilians employed by the Inproser engineering and construction firm, and one was a student at the University of Magallanes. The crew was composed entirely of Chilean Air Force personnel.

== Investigation ==
An accident investigation is being conducted by the Chilean Air Force. As of December 2019, the cause of the crash is unknown, due in part to an insufficient quantity of recovered components. The aircraft experienced a complete break-up, either in flight or after crashing into the sea.

== See also ==
- 2011 Chilean Air Force C-212 crash
