= Brazilian research ship Almirante Maximiano =

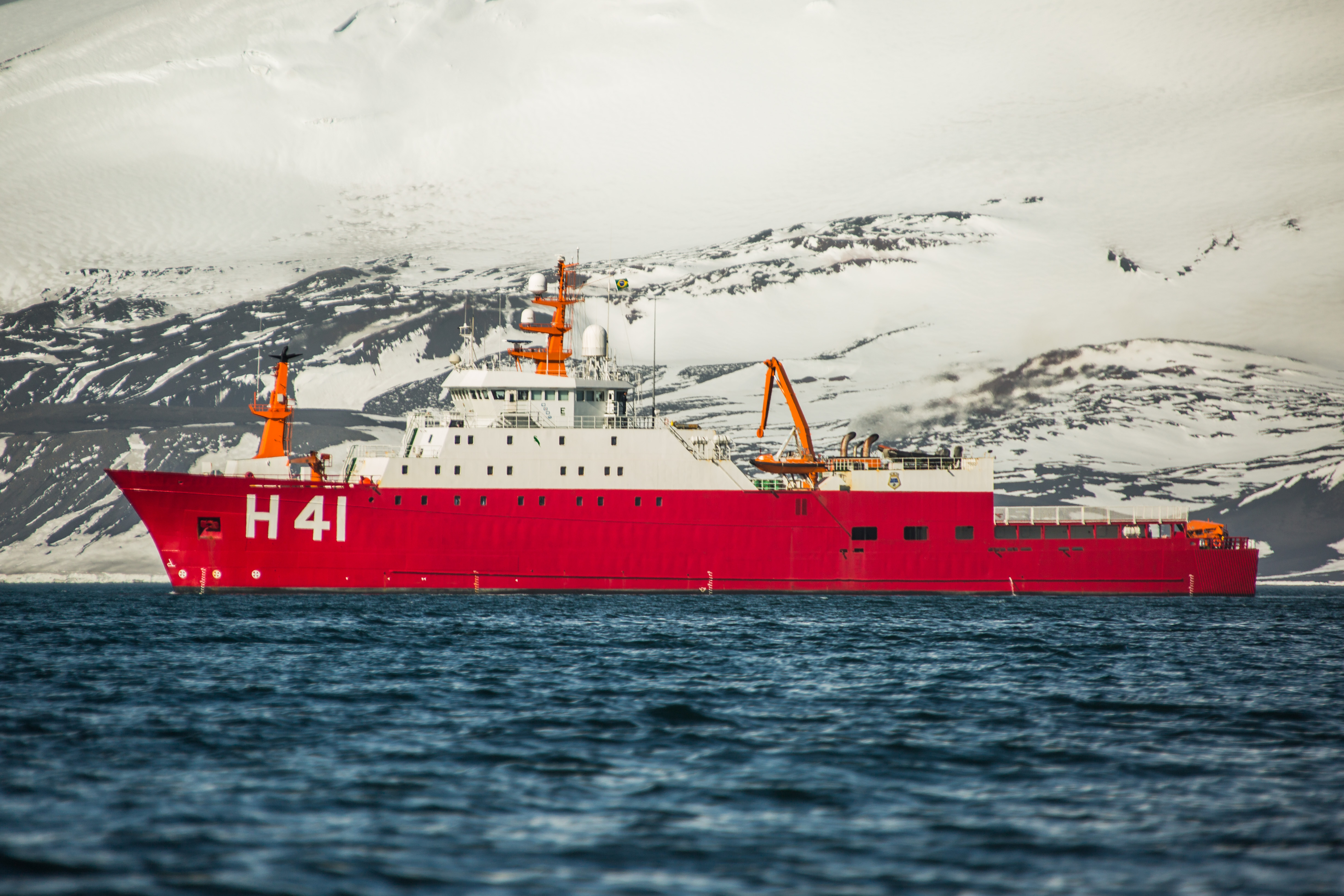
- Almirante Maximiano

History

Brazil
- Name: Almirante Maximiano
- Namesake: Admiral Maximiano Eduardo da Silva Fonseca
- Builder: Todd Pacific Shipyards
- Launched: 13 February 1974
- Commissioned: 3 February 2009
- Home port: Rio de Janeiro
- Identification: IMO number: 7391264; MMSI number: 710481000; Callsign: PWPM; Pennant number: H41
- Status: Ship in active service

General characteristics
- Type: Research ship
- Displacement: 3,865 tons standard; 5,450 tons full load
- Length: 93.4 m (306 ft)
- Beam: 13.4 m (44 ft)
- Draught: 6.59 m (21.6 ft)
- Speed: 13 knots (24 km/h; 15 mph)
- Range: 20,000 mi (17,000 nmi; 32,000 km)
- Endurance: 90 days
- Complement: 106
- Aircraft carried: 2 Helibrás Esquilo (locally designated as UH-12/13)
- Aviation facilities: Helipad and hangar
- Notes: NGB

Almirante Maximiano (H41) is an ice-strengthened oceanographic research ship of the Brazilian Navy. The ship bears this name in honor of Admiral Maximiano Eduardo da Silva Fonseca. It was built by the Todd Pacific Shipyards of Seattle, Washington, and was launched on 13 February 1974. It was acquired by the Brazilian Navy on 3 September 2008 for the Brazilian Antarctic Program. Prior to Brazilian service, the ship served commercial operations under the names Ocean Empress, Naeraberg, American Empress, Maureen Sea, Scotoil I and Theriot Offshore I.

== Operational history ==
In November 2017 the ship actively participated in the search for the Argentine submarine ARA San Juan, which disappeared during a patrol along the Argentine coast. In 21 November, the vessel carried out an oceanic sweep operation in conjunction with ARA Puerto Deseado and ARA Austral of the Argentine Navy.
