= Brazilian Antarctic Program =

Program of the Brazilian Navy

- Programa Antártico Brasileiro
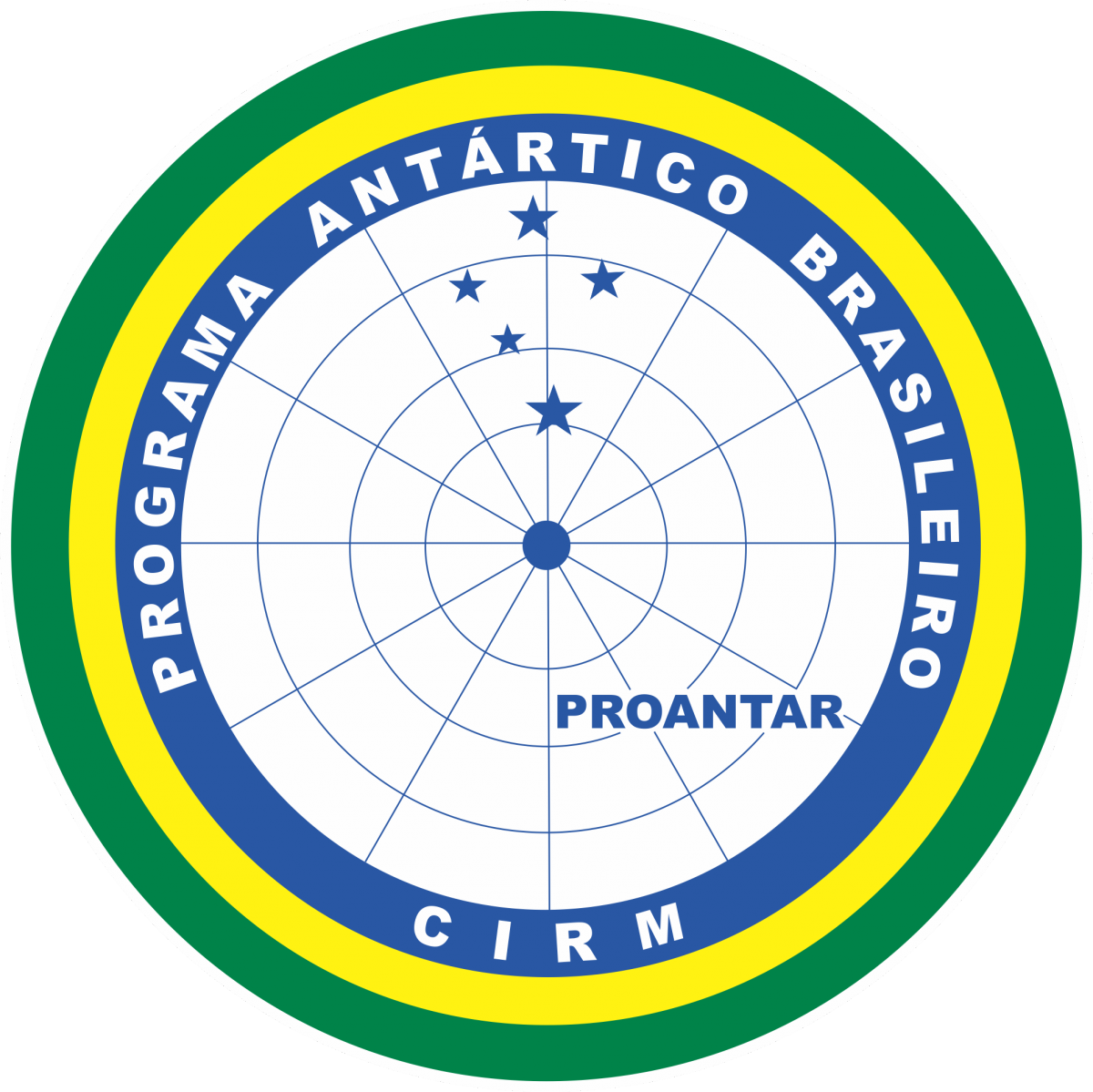

Government agency overview
- Formed: January 1982; 44 years ago
- Headquarters: Brasília, Federal District
- Parent Government agency: CNPq, Brazilian Navy
- Website: PROANTAR

The Brazilian Antarctic Program (Portuguese: Programa Antártico Brasileiro; PROANTAR) is a program of the Brazilian Navy which has presence in the continent of Antarctica. It coordinates research and the operational support for research in the region. It currently maintains a year-round research station in Antarctica (Comandante Ferraz Antarctic Station), as well as several seasonal field camps. It also maintains two research vessels that sail in the Antarctic waters (the icebreakers Almirante Maximiano and Ary Rongel).

== History ==
The program was officially created in January 1982, when the Brazilian Navy acquired the Danish icebreaker Thala Dan, later renamed Barão de Teffé. That same year, Brazil sent its first expedition ("Operation Antarctica I") to the Antarctic continent. The Barão de Teffé conducted a reconnaissance mission to the northwestern sector of Antarctica in order to select the location where the future Brazilian Antarctic Station would be built. The success of that expedition resulted in international recognition of the Brazilian presence in Antarctica, which allowed the acceptance of the country as a consultative party to the Antarctic Treaty in 1983.

A second expedition ("Operation Antarctica II") was held in the summer of 1983–84, primarily focused on transporting and constructing the Brazilian station. The Comandante Ferraz Antarctic Station, consisting of 8 modules, was completed on 6 February 1984. The station was expanded to 33 modules in the following year. Starting in 1986, the station became permanently occupied during the 365 days of the year.

In February 1991, President Fernando Collor de Mello reaffirmed Brazil's interest in the region by visiting the Brazilian Antarctic Station, where he spent three days. He was the first Brazilian president to set foot in the Antarctic. In January 2008, 13 congressmen members of the Brazilian Antarctica Parliamentary Committee visited the Brazilian Antarctic Station. Another visit by the members of Congress took place in January 2009.

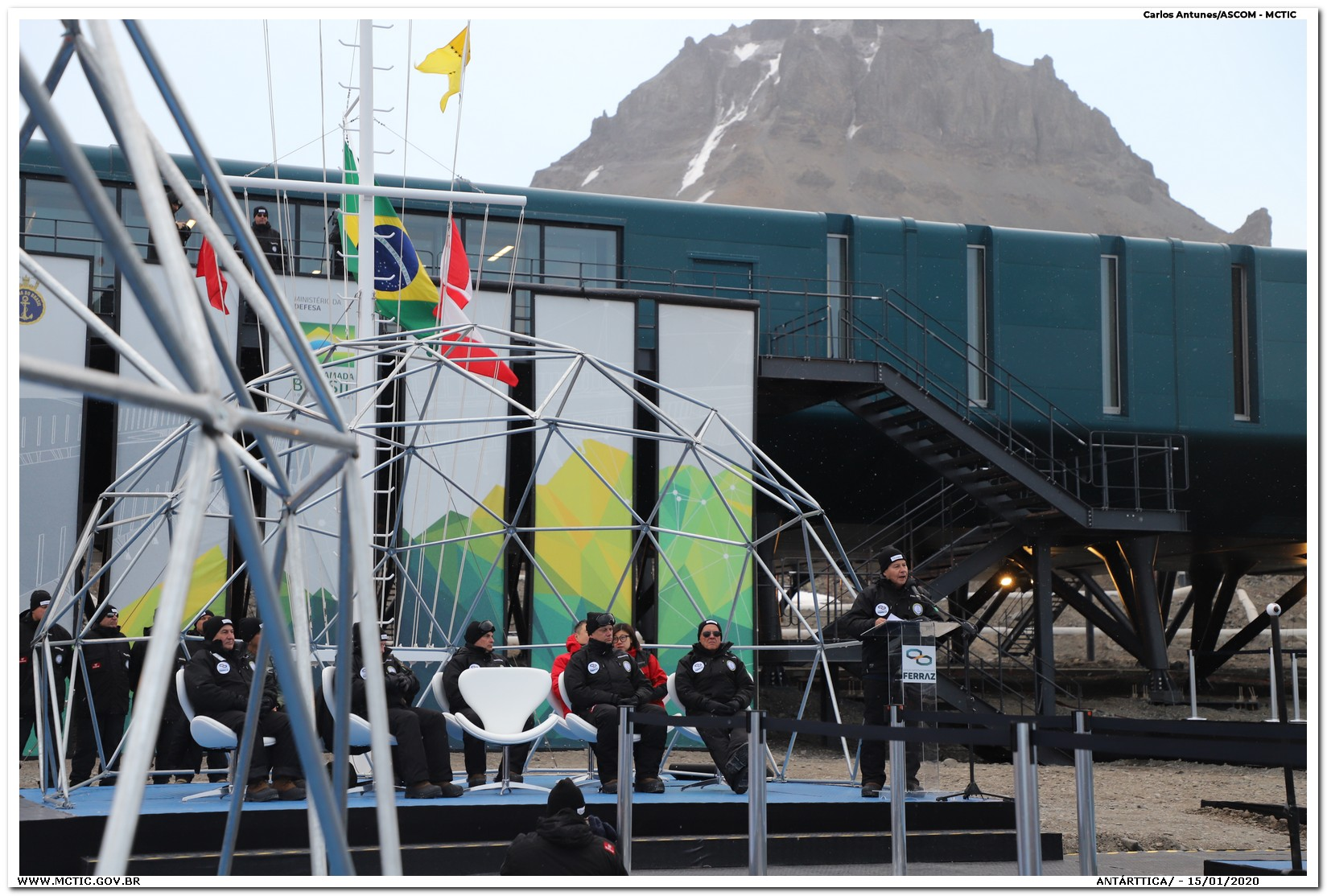
Inauguration of the new Base Comandante Ferraz facilities, 2020.

On February 16, 2008, President Luiz Inácio Lula da Silva and a delegation of twenty-three people, including first lady Marisa Letícia, visited the country's station in Antarctica. The Brazilian Government defined the presidential trip as a "political gesture" in support of the work displayed by Brazilian scientists and military personnel.

In 2009, the Brazilian Navy incorporated the icebreaker Almirante Maximiano (ex-"Ocean Empress") into its fleet. The Almirante Maximiano operates UH-12/13 and IH-6B aircraft with a hangar for two helicopters. The Brazilian Navy installed five modern laboratories for the development of scientific research in the Antarctic environment. The ship can accommodate 106 passengers, with 1/3 being scientists and researchers.

In 2009 Brazil made its first national scientific expedition to the Antarctic ice sheet. The expedition integrated atmospheric, glaciological, geological and geophysical studies along the Patriot Hills area and also along the subglacial lake Ellsworth area. On 12 January 2012, the Brazilian Antarctic Program inaugurated the Criosfera 1 module, located on the plateau of the western Antarctica ice sheet, at 84°00' S–79°30' W. It is located 670 kilometres (420 mi) from the geographical South Pole and 2,500 kilometres (1,600 mi) south of the Comandante Ferraz Antarctic Station.

On 25 February 2012, a blast in the machine room housing the generators at the station caused a fire that, according to the Brazilian navy, destroyed approximately 70% of the building. Two soldiers, originally reported as missing by the Brazilian navy, were found dead in the debris of the station after the fire, while a third one sustained non-life-threatening injuries. It has been rebuilt since and the new facility was inaugurated with the presence of Brazil's Vice-President Hamilton Mourão and Minister of Science and Technology Marcos Pontes in January 2020.

== Facilities ==
=== In Antarctica ===
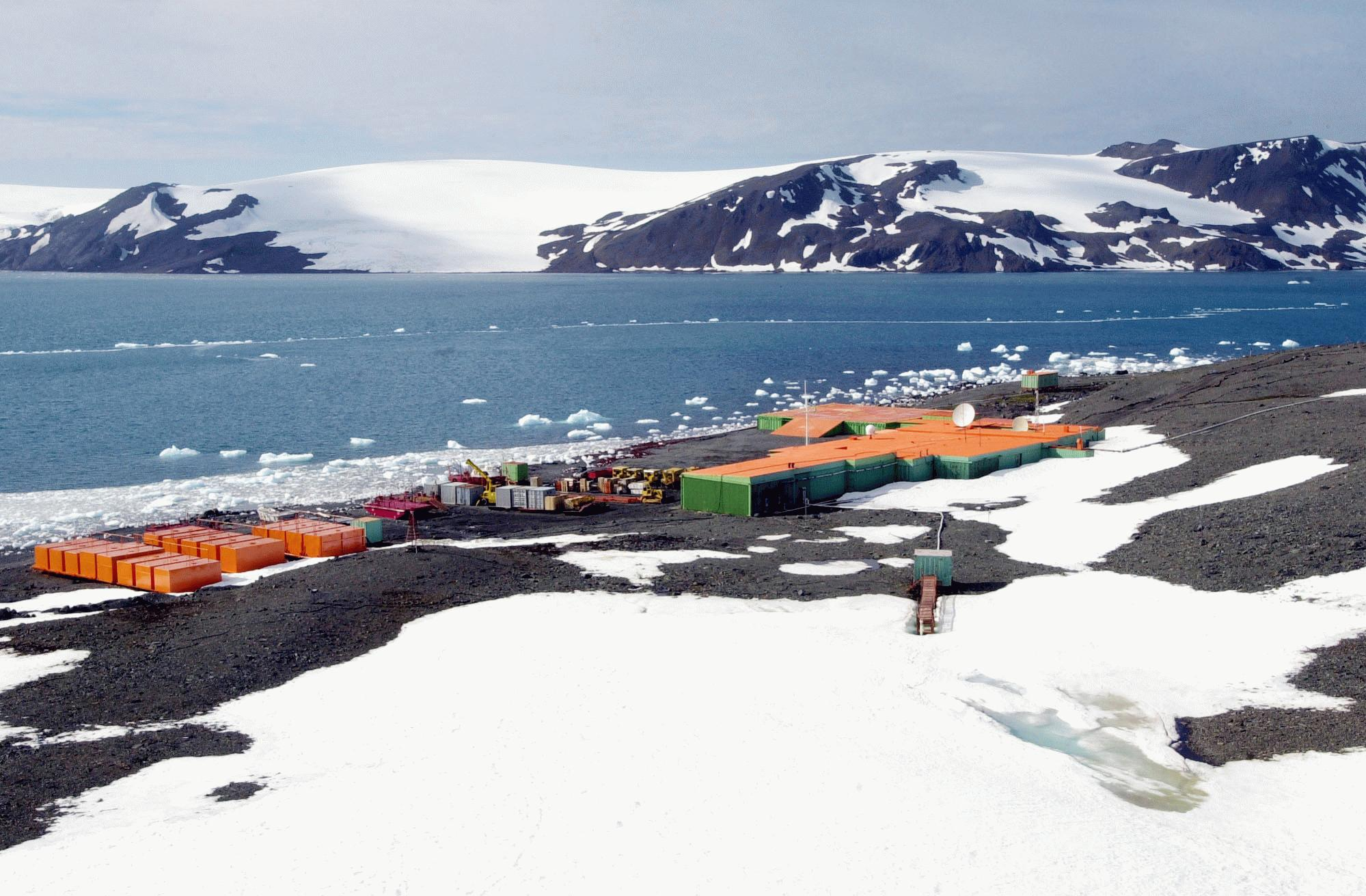
View of Comandante Ferraz Antarctic Station (before the fire and remodeling) facing Admiralty Bay

- Comandante Ferraz Antarctic Station (UN/LOCODE: AQ-CFZ), a year-round station located in Admiralty Bay, King George Island, at 62°08′S 58°40′W
- Criosfera 1, a standalone module located in Union Glacier, at 84°00′S 79°30′W
- Refuge Emílio Goeldi, a shelter located at Elephant Island, at 61°05′S 55°20′W
- Refuge Astronomer Cruls, a shelter located at Nelson Island, King George Island, at 62°14′S 58°48′W
- Refuge Engineer Wiltgen, a shelter located at Elephant Island, at 61°01′S 55°21′W (dismantled)
- Refuge Pe. Balduino Rambo, a shelter located at Fildes Peninsula, King George Island, at 62°12′S 58°59′W (dismantled)
- Hardy Point Camp, a camp located on Greenwich Island, at 62°30′S 59°45′W
- Harmony Point Camp, a camp located on Nelson Island (South Shetland Islands), at 62°18′S 59°14′W (Dismantled)

=== Outside Antarctica ===
- Estação de Apoio Antártico - Support station located at Rio Grande

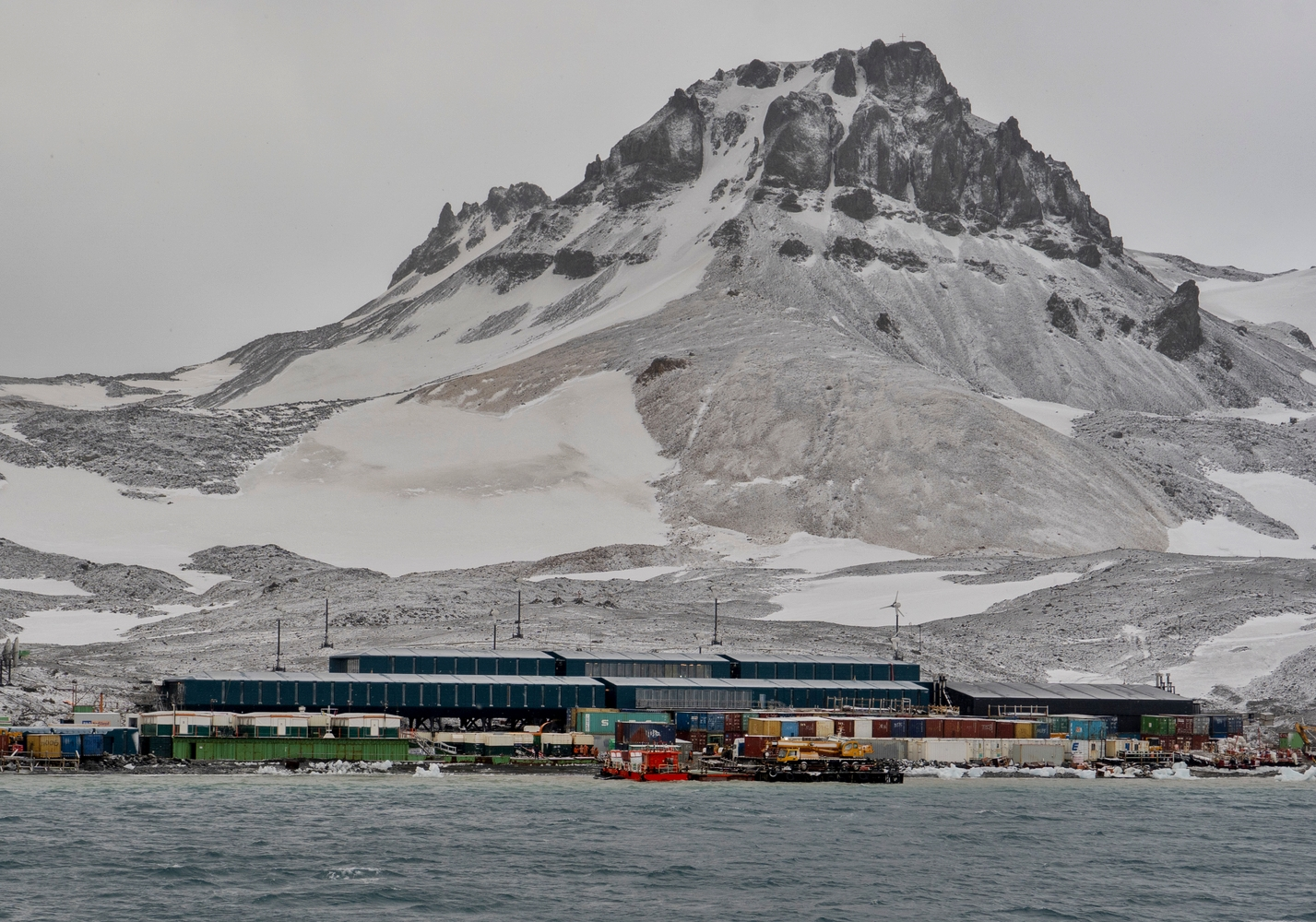
View of the Almirante Ferraz base

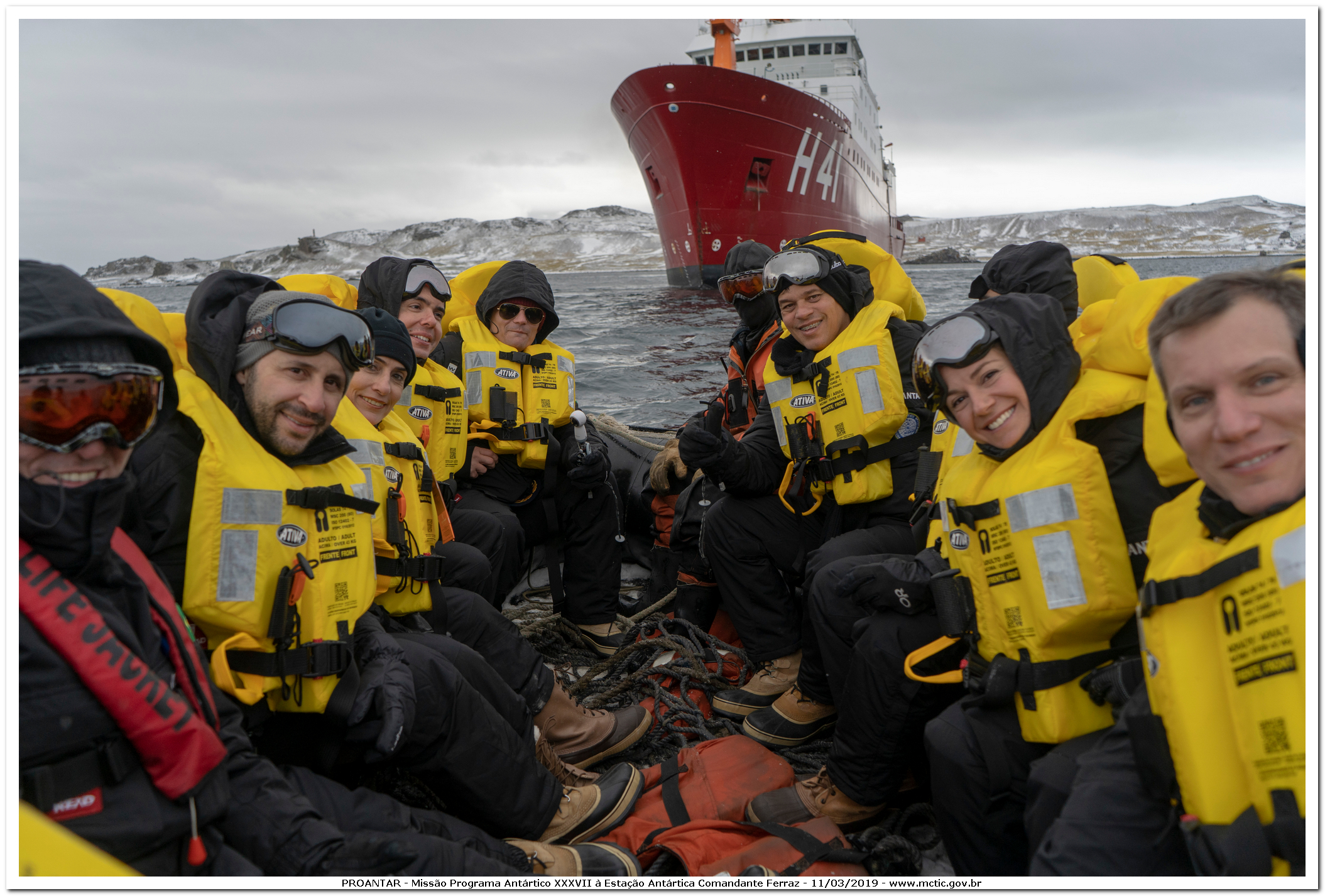
Brazilian navy personnel and researcher leaving the Almirante Maximiano by boat, going to Comandante Ferraz base

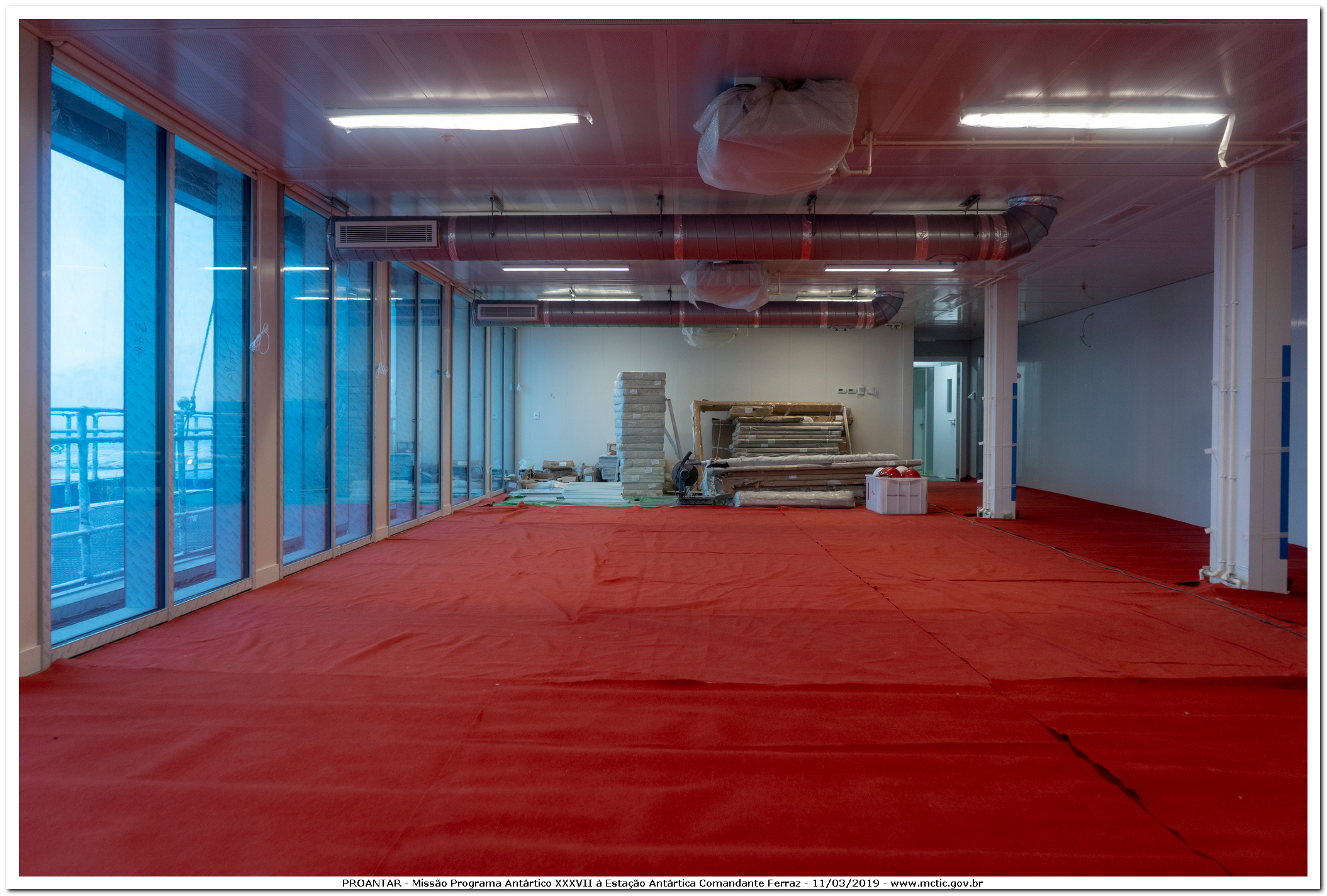
Inside the Almirante Ferraz base, before inauguration

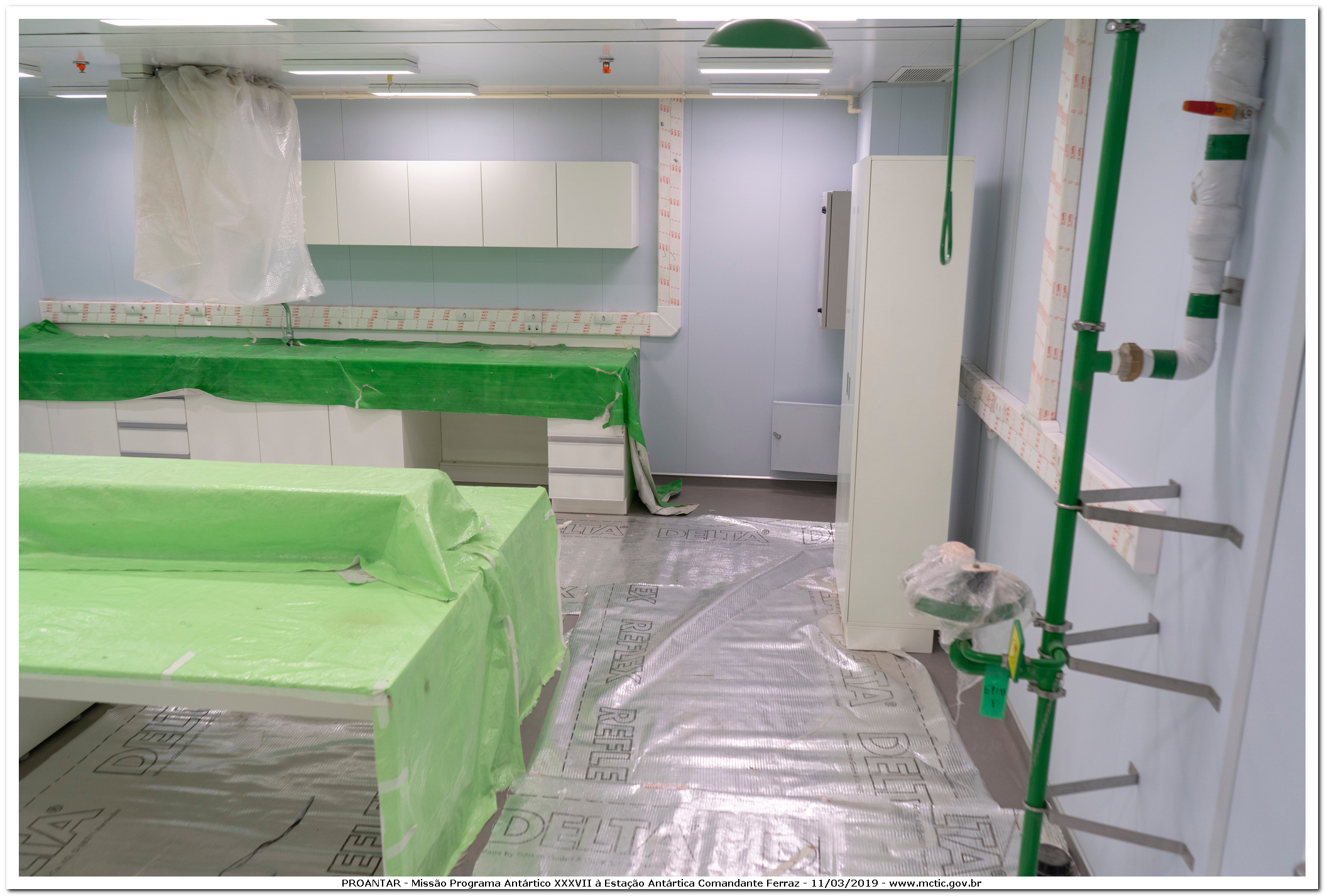
Inside a lab in the Almirante Ferraz base, before inauguration

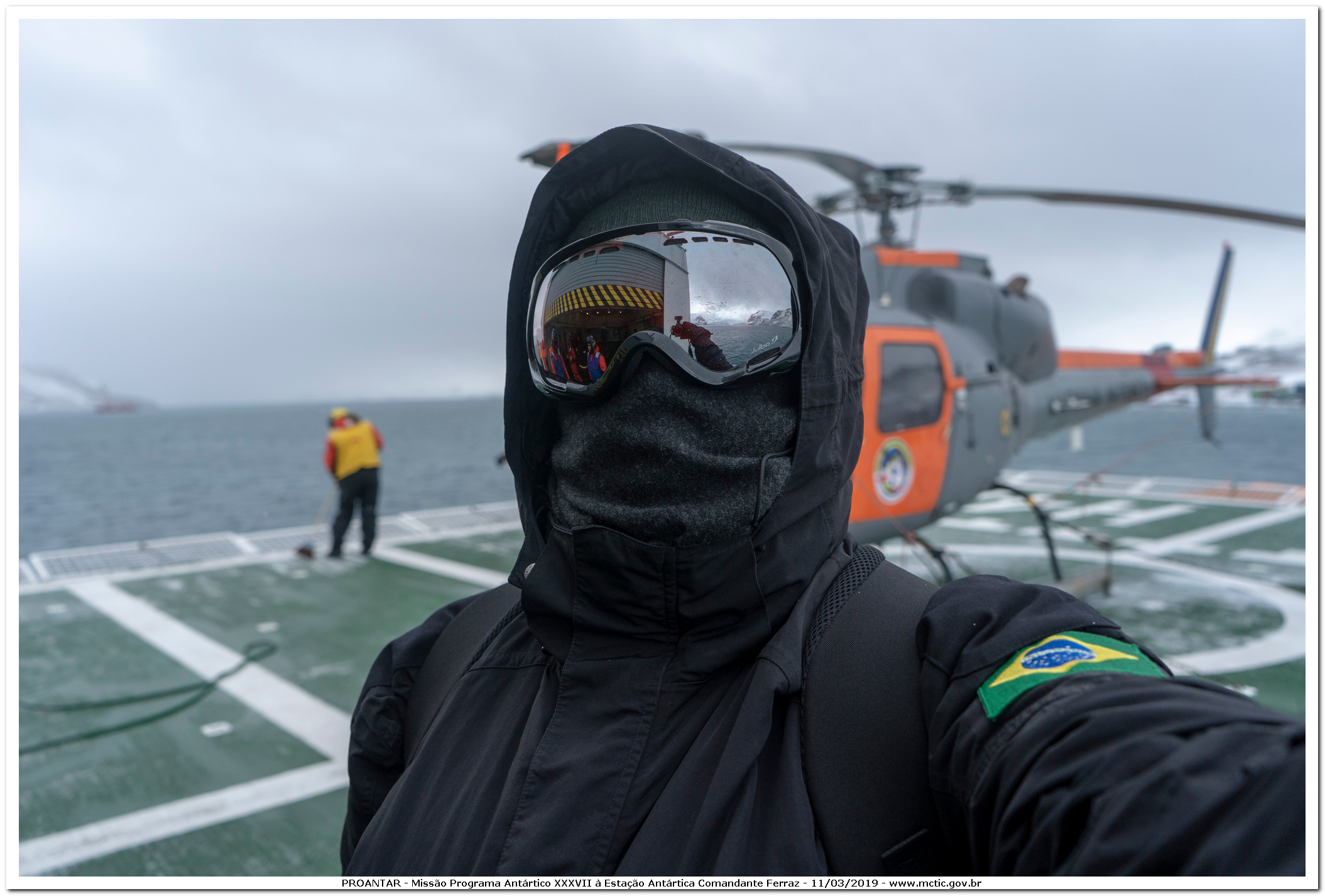
Part of the gear used by navy personnel and researchers in Antarctic

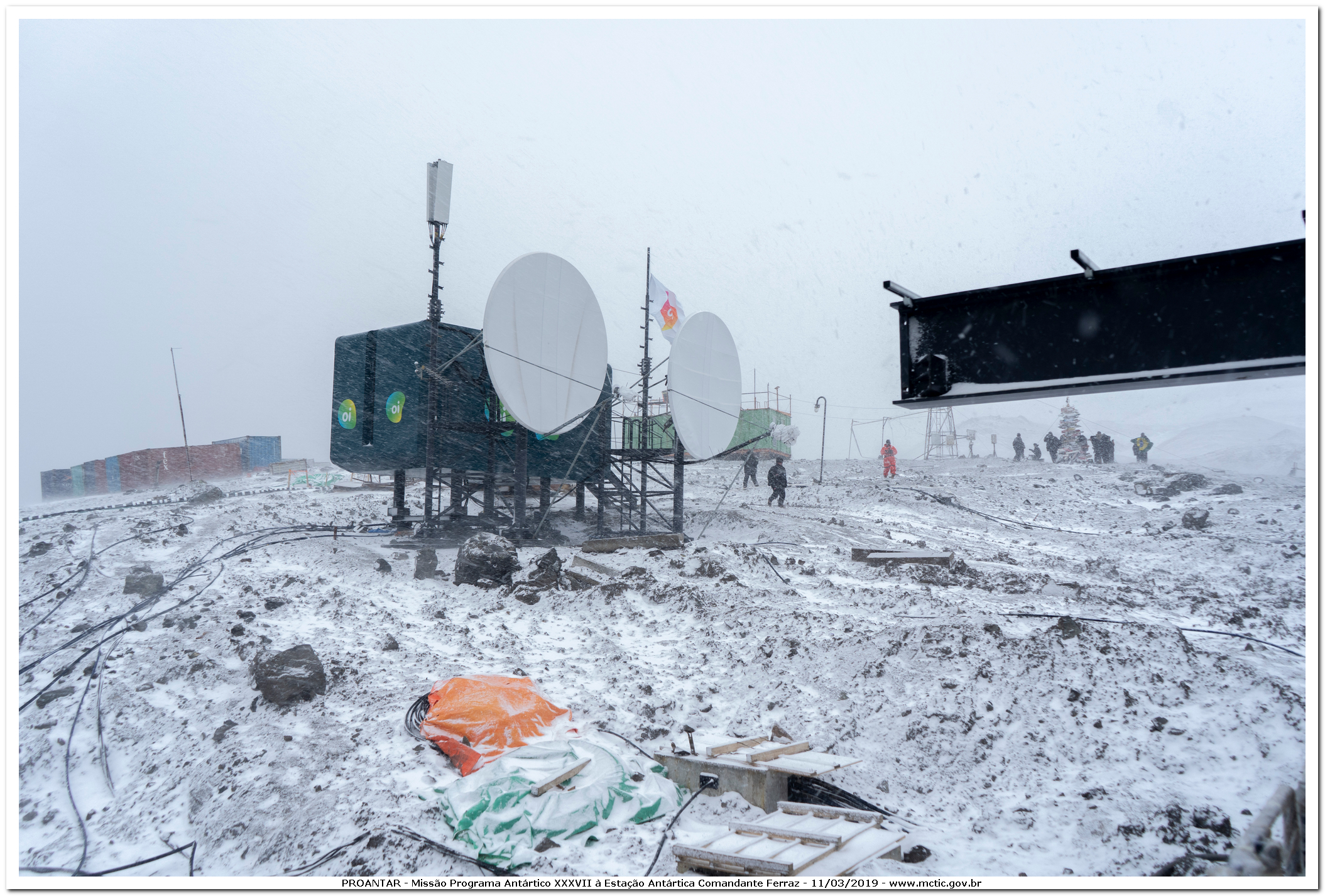
Almirante Ferraz communication module during snowstorm

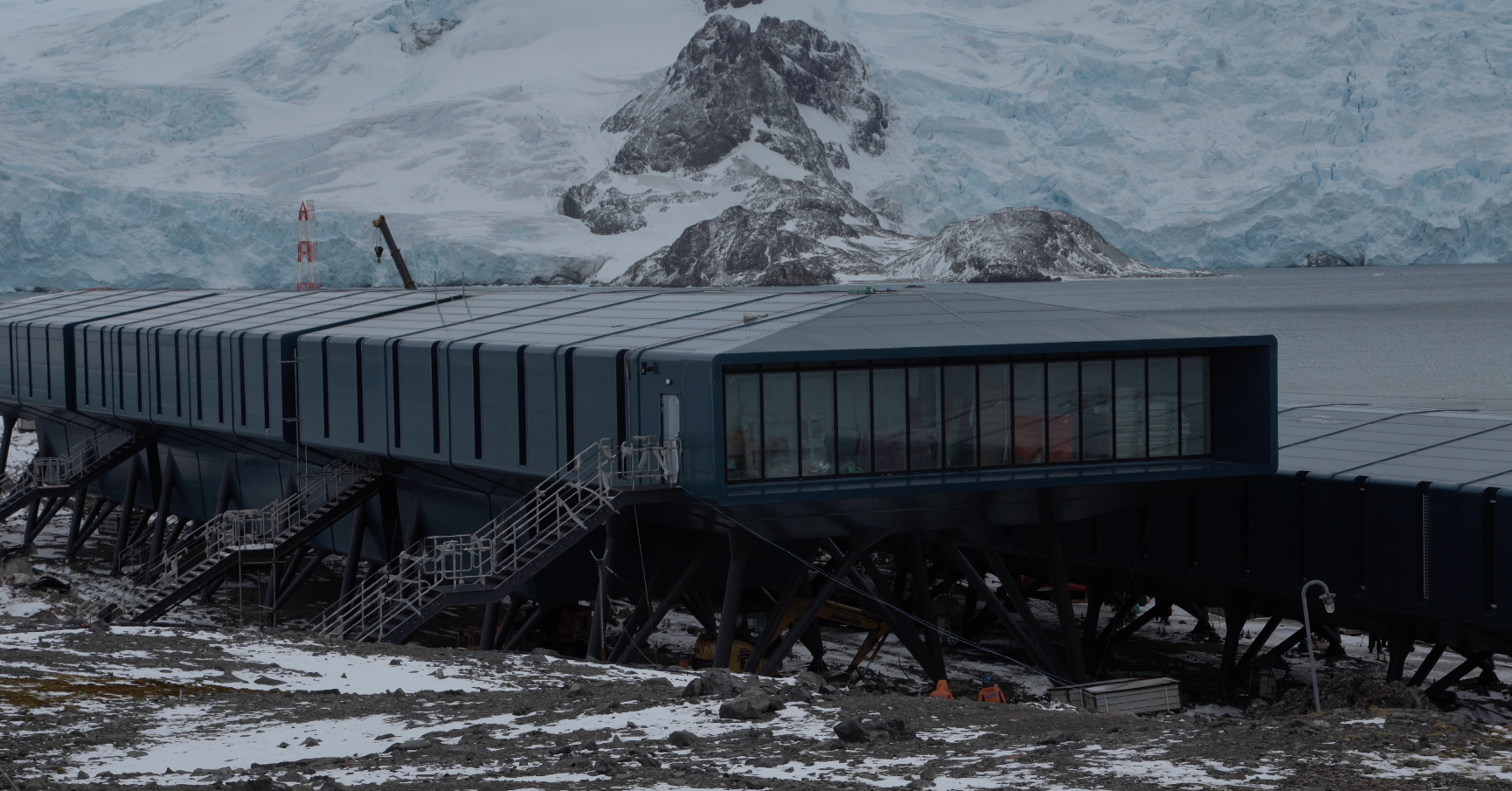
Almirante Ferraz base. Observe that the base is on a high level platform, making its structure aerodynamic.

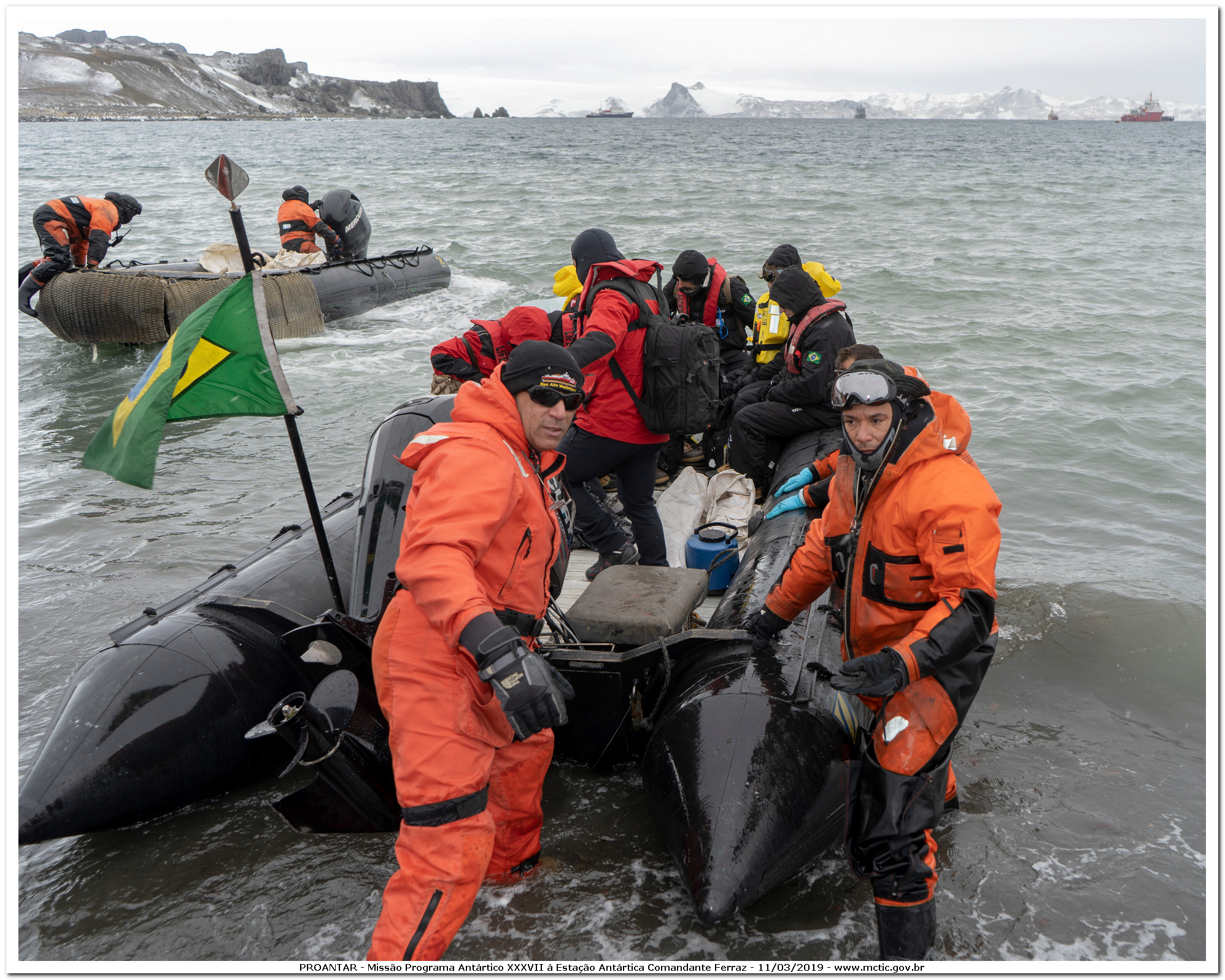
Navy personnel and researchers arriving onshore in front of the station. The most common transport method is by helicopter.

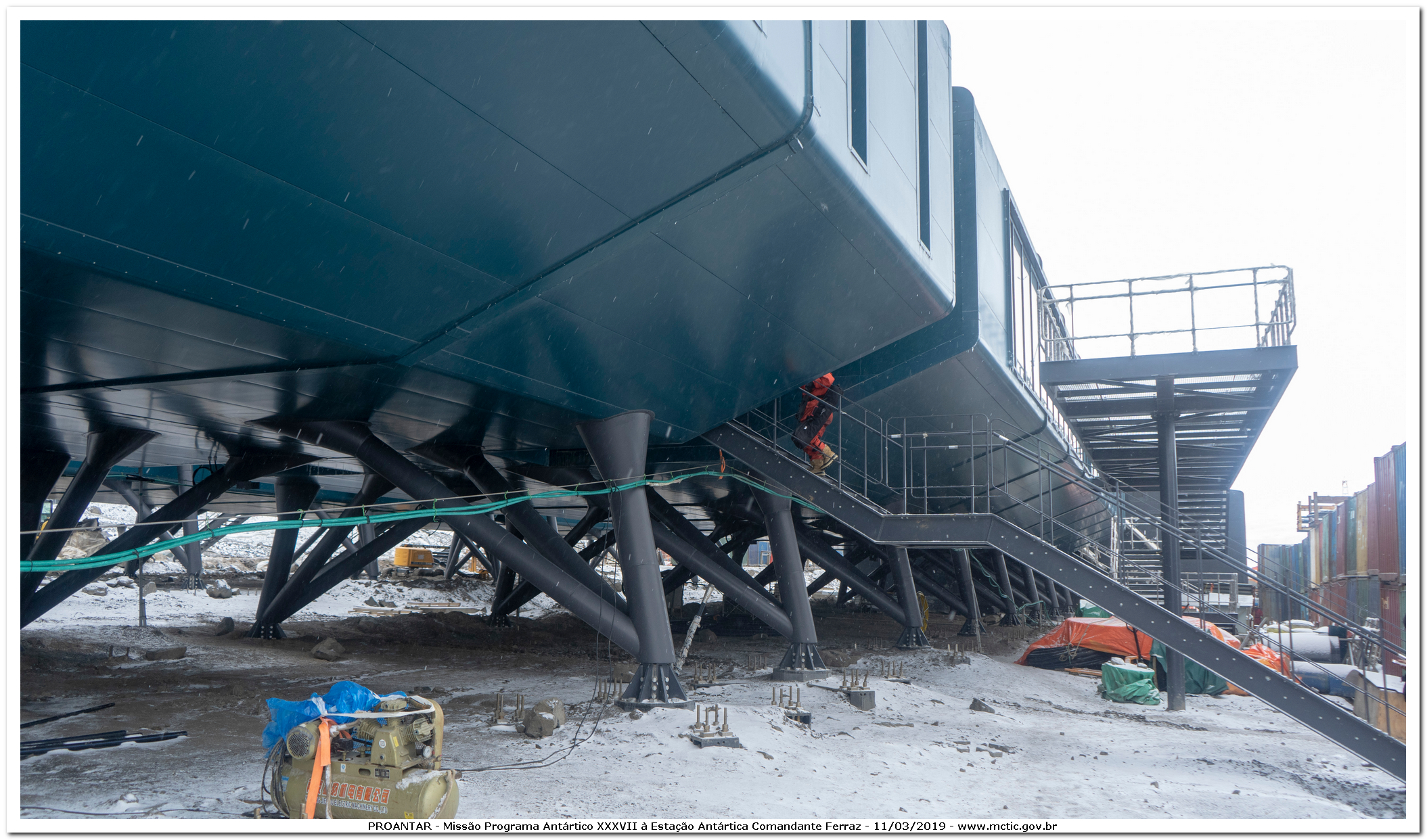
Detail of the bottom of the Almirante Ferraz base. The base was completely rebuilt.

== Transport ==
The Brazilian Navy and the Brazilian Air Force are responsible for the logistics of the Brazilian Antarctic Program, including the transport of military and civilian personnel, equipment, and supplies to Antarctica. The main equipment used for this purpose are:

=== Ships ===
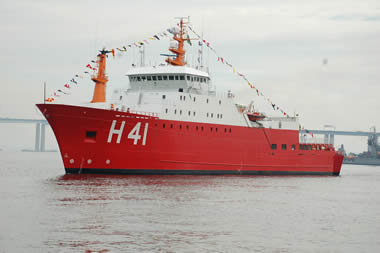
Brazilian Navy icebreaker Almirante Maximiano

- Almirante Maximiano (H41) - Icebreaker and oceanographic research ship.
- Ary Rongel (H44) - Icebreaker and oceanographic research ship, will be put out of service in this decade by Almirante Saldanha.
- Almirante Saldanha (H22) - Future icebreaker and oceanographic research ship, is expected to be delivered in 2025.
- Cruzeiro do Sul (H38) - Oceanographic research ship of the Brazilian Navy.
  - NOc Professor Besnard - Oceanographic research ship of University of São Paulo.

=== Aircraft ===
- Embraer KC-390 - military transport aircraft operated by Brazilian Air Force in logistic support, delivering cargo to Comandante Ferraz Antarctic base.
- Airbus H135 - Helicopter that conduct missions between Comandante Ferraz Antarctic base and Brazilian Navy Antarctic ships, will be operated by the Almirante Saldanha.
- Bell 206 - Helicopter operated from the Almirante Maximiano.
- Eurocopter AS350 - Helicopter operated from the Ary Rongel.

== Organizations ==
The Brazilian Antarctic Program is managed by the Brazilian Navy in partnership with various government organizations. Also, several Federal universities and research institutes take part in the program.

- Ministry of Defense, manages and operates the Brazilian Antarctic Program through the Brazilian Navy and Brazilian Air Force;
- National Council for Scientific and Technological Development (CNPq), funds the coordination and implementation of research;
- Ministry of Science and Technology, sets the scientific research policy;
- Ministry of the Environment, ensures compliance with international rules to minimize the impact of human presence in Antarctica;
- Ministry of Foreign Affairs, responsible for the National Policy of Antarctic Affairs;
- Ministry of Mines and Energy (through Petrobras), supplies the special antifreeze fuel for the facilities and vehicles operating in Antarctica.

== See also ==
- Brazilian Antarctica
