= Refuge Engineer Wiltgen =

Refuge Engineer Wiltgen Refúgio Engenheiro Wiltgen
- Research station
- Refuge Engineer Wiltgen, Elephant Island
- Coordinates: Maps 61.01°S 55.21°W
- Country: Brazil
- Established: 3 February 1985

Population
  - Total: 0 (formerly peaked at 6)
- Time zone: UTC-3 (BRT)
- Website: PROANTAR

Refuge Engineer Wiltgen (Portuguese: Refúgio Engenheiro Wiltgen) was a Brazilian Antarctic summer installation named after Engineer João Aristides Wiltgen, founder of the Brazilian Institute for Antarctic Studies. Established on 3 February 1985, the structure was located on Elephant Island, South Shetland Islands, Antarctica, and depended both logistically and administratively on Comandante Ferraz station. It was dismantled during the summer 1997/98.

== See also ==
- Research stations in Antarctica
