= Brazilian research ship Ary Rongel =

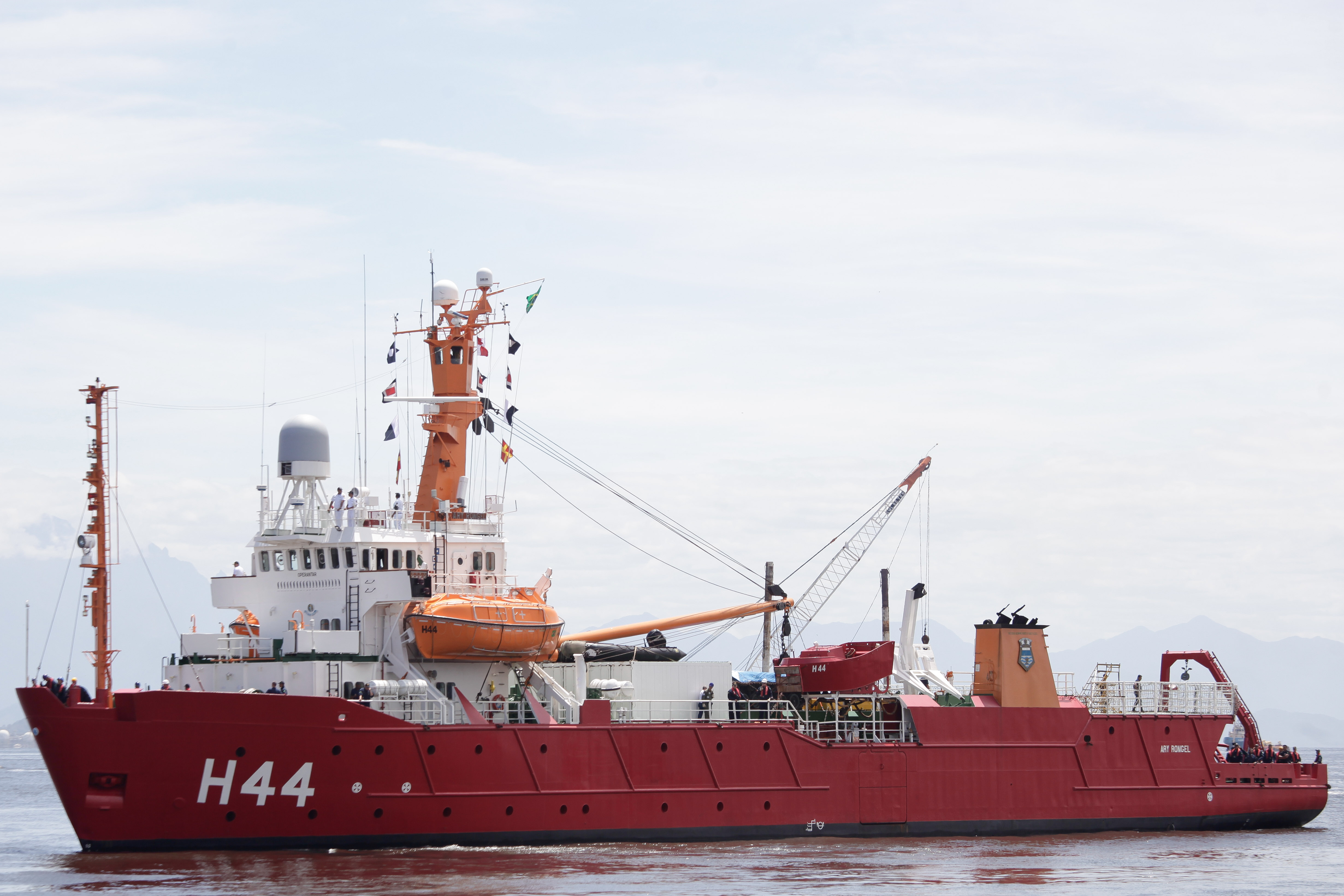
- Ary Rongel (H44)

History
- Name: Polar Queen
- Builder: Georg Eide's Sønner
- Laid down: 27 September 1980
- Launched: 22 January 1981
- Completed: March 1981
- Identification: IMO number: 7922142; MMSI number: 710400000; Callsign: PWAR
- Fate: Acquired by Brazilian Navy, 1994

Brazil
- Name: Ary Rongel
- Namesake: Admiral Ary dos Santos Rongel
- Acquired: 19 April 1994
- Commissioned: 25 April 1994
- Home port: Rio de Janeiro
- Identification: Hull number H44
- Status: in active service

General characteristics (in Brazilian service)
- Type: Research ship
- Displacement: 1,928 long tons (1,959 t) standard; 3,628 long tons (3,686 t) full load
- Length: 75.3 m (247 ft 1 in)
- Beam: 13.0 m (42 ft 8 in)
- Draught: 5.3 m (17 ft 5 in)
- Ice class: Ice-strengthened
- Installed power: 2 × MaK 6M-453 diesel engines; 4,500 hp (3,356 kW)
- Propulsion: 1 × controllable pitch propeller; 1 × stern thruster; 2 × bow thrusters
- Speed: 14.5 knots (26.9 km/h; 16.7 mph)
- Range: 17,000 nmi (31,000 km; 20,000 mi) at 12 knots (22 km/h; 14 mph)
- Capacity: 2,400 m^{3} (85,000 cu ft)
- Complement: 70 + 22 scientists
- Aircraft carried: 2 × Helibrás Esquilo (locally designated as UH-12/13)
- Aviation facilities: Helipad and hangar

Ary Rongel (H44) is an ice-strengthened oceanographic research ship of the Brazilian Navy. It was built by the Georg Eide's Sønner of Høylandsbygda on the island of Halsnøya in Norway as Polar Queen and was launched on 22 January 1981. It was acquired by the Brazilian Navy in 1994 for the Brazilian Antarctic Program.

== Description ==
As built, the ship was an ice-strengthened research vessel. The vessel measured 1,496 gross register tons (GRT) and 1,050 tons deadweight (DWT), was 65.1 metres (213 ft 7 in) long overall and 56.0 metres (183 ft 9 in) between perpendiculars with a beam of 13.1 metres (43 ft 0 in). In 1986, the ship was lengthened to 75.3 metres (247 ft 1 in) long overall and 67.4 metres (221 ft 2 in) between perpendiculars. The vessel was remeasured as 1,982 gross tonnage (GT) and 1,100 deadweight.

The ship is powered by two MaK 6M-453 diesel engines driving one shaft turning a controllable pitch propeller, one stern thruster and two bow thrusters rated at 4,500 horsepower (3,356 kW). The ship is capable of 14.5 knots (26.9 km/h; 16.7 mph) and has a cruising range of 17,000 nautical miles (31,000 km; 20,000 mi) at 12 knots (22 km/h; 14 mph).

In Brazilian naval service, the research ship has a standard displacement of 1,928 long tons (1,959 t) and 3,628 long tons (3,686 t) at full load. The ship is equipped with a helipad and is capable of operating up to two UH-13 Helibrás Esquilo helicopters. The vessel's cargo capacity in naval service is 2,400 m^{3} (85,000 cu ft) and the ship has a complement of 70 including 19 officers and space for 22 scientists.

== Service history ==
The research vessel was constructed at Georg Eide's Sønner in Høylandsbygda, Norway with the yard number 111. The vessel's keel was laid down on 27 September 1980 and the ship was launched on 22 January 1981 as Polar Queen. Polar Queen was completed in March 1981.

The vessel was put up for sale and was acquired by the Brazilian Navy on 19 April 1994 for use as a polar research ship assigned to the Brazilian Antarctic Program. Renamed Ary Rongel for Admiral Ary dos Santos Rongel, the ship was commissioned into the Brazilian Navy on 25 April 1994 and given the hull number H44. The ship is homeported in Rio de Janeiro.

== Bibliography ==
- "Polar Queen (7922142)". Miramar Ship Index.
- Saunders, Stephen, ed. (2009). Jane's Fighting Ships 2009–2010 (112 ed.). Alexandria, Virginia: Jane's Information Group Inc. ISBN 978-0-7106-2888-6.
