= Comandante Ferraz Antarctic Station =

Ferraz Station
- Antarctic base
- Comandante Ferraz Antarctic Station
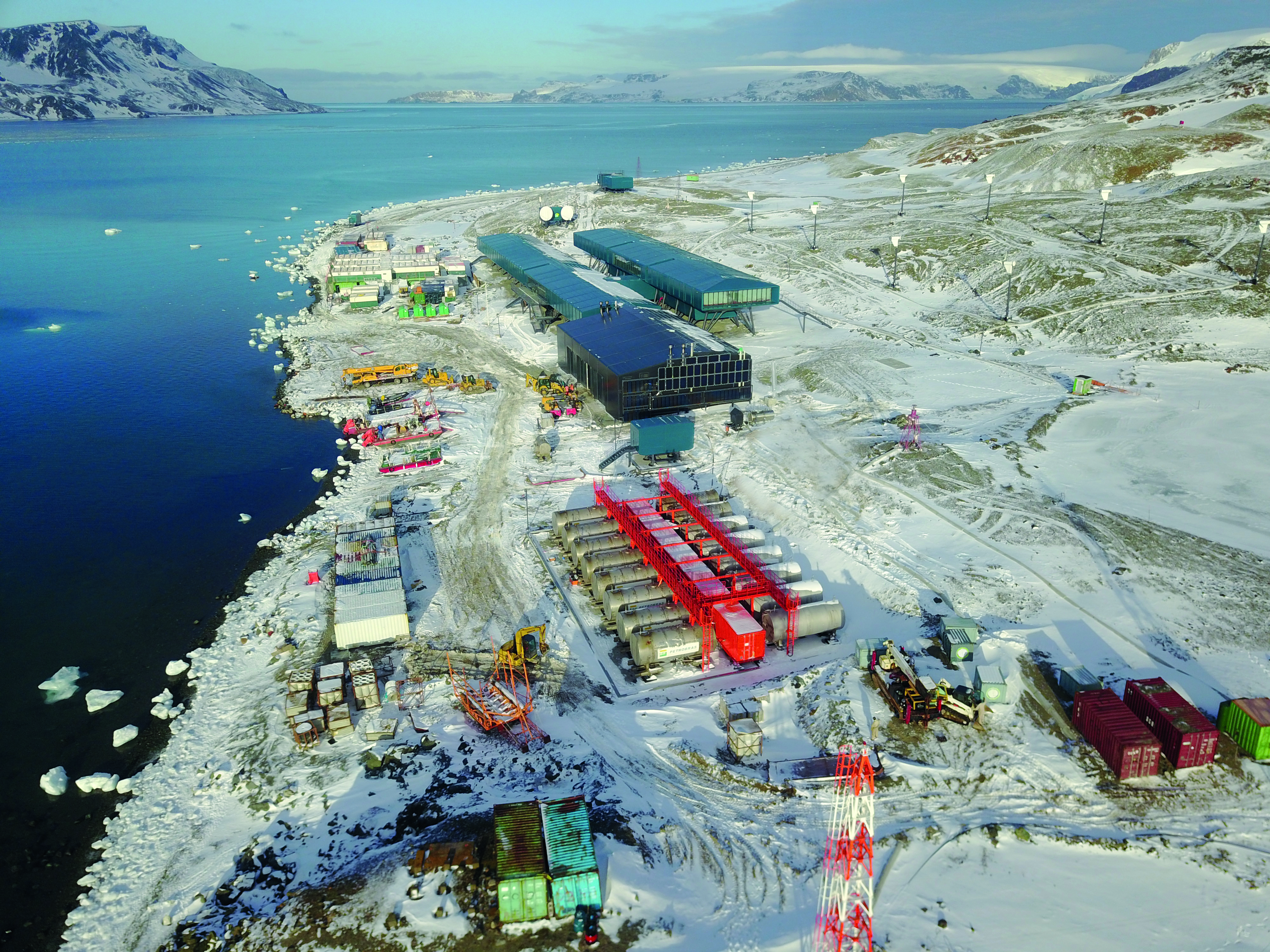
- New Comandante Ferraz Antarctic Station

- Location of Ferraz Station in Antarctica
- Coordinates: 62°05′07″S 58°23′29″W
- Country: Brazil
- Location in Antarctica: King George Island; South Shetland Islands; Antarctica
- Administered by: Brazilian Antarctic Program
- Established: 6 February 1984
- Elevation: 8 m (26 ft)

Population (2017)
  - Summer: 35
  - Winter: 15
- Time zone: BRT (UTC-3:00)
- Postal code: 20001-971
- UN/LOCODE: AQ CFZ
- Type: All-year round
- Period: Annual
- Status: Operational
- Activities: List: Greenhouse effect; Ozone layer
- Website: PROANTAR

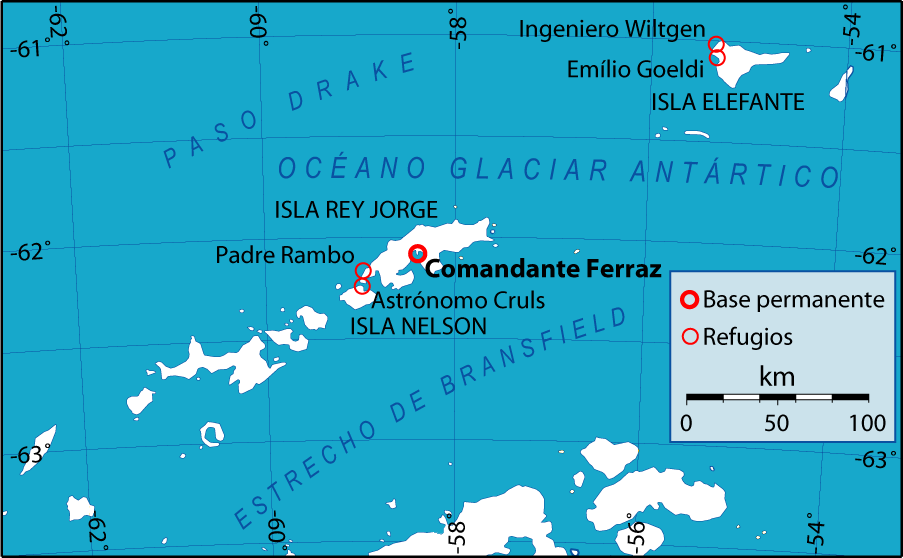
Location of the station and its nearby shelters

The Comandante Ferraz Antarctic Station (Portuguese: Estação Antártica Comandante Ferraz) is a permanent Antarctic research station named after the Brazilian Navy Commander Luís Antônio de Carvalho Ferraz (1940–1982), who visited Antarctica many times with the British exploration team and managed to convince his government to create a self-guided Brazilian Antarctic Program.

Located in Admiralty Bay (Portuguese: Baía do Almirantado), King George Island (Portuguese: Ilha do Rei George), near the tip of the Antarctic Peninsula, 130 km north of the peninsula, the station began operating on 6 February 1984, brought to Antarctica in modules by the oceanographic ship Barão de Teffé and several other Brazilian naval ships. It now houses about 64 people, including researchers, technicians and staff, military and civilians.

== History ==
The station was named after Navy Commander Luís Antônio de Carvalho Ferraz, a hydrographer and oceanographer who visited Antarctica twice on British vessels. He was instrumental in persuading his country's government to develop an Antarctic program, and died suddenly in 1982 while representing Brazil at an oceanographic conference in Halifax, Nova Scotia.

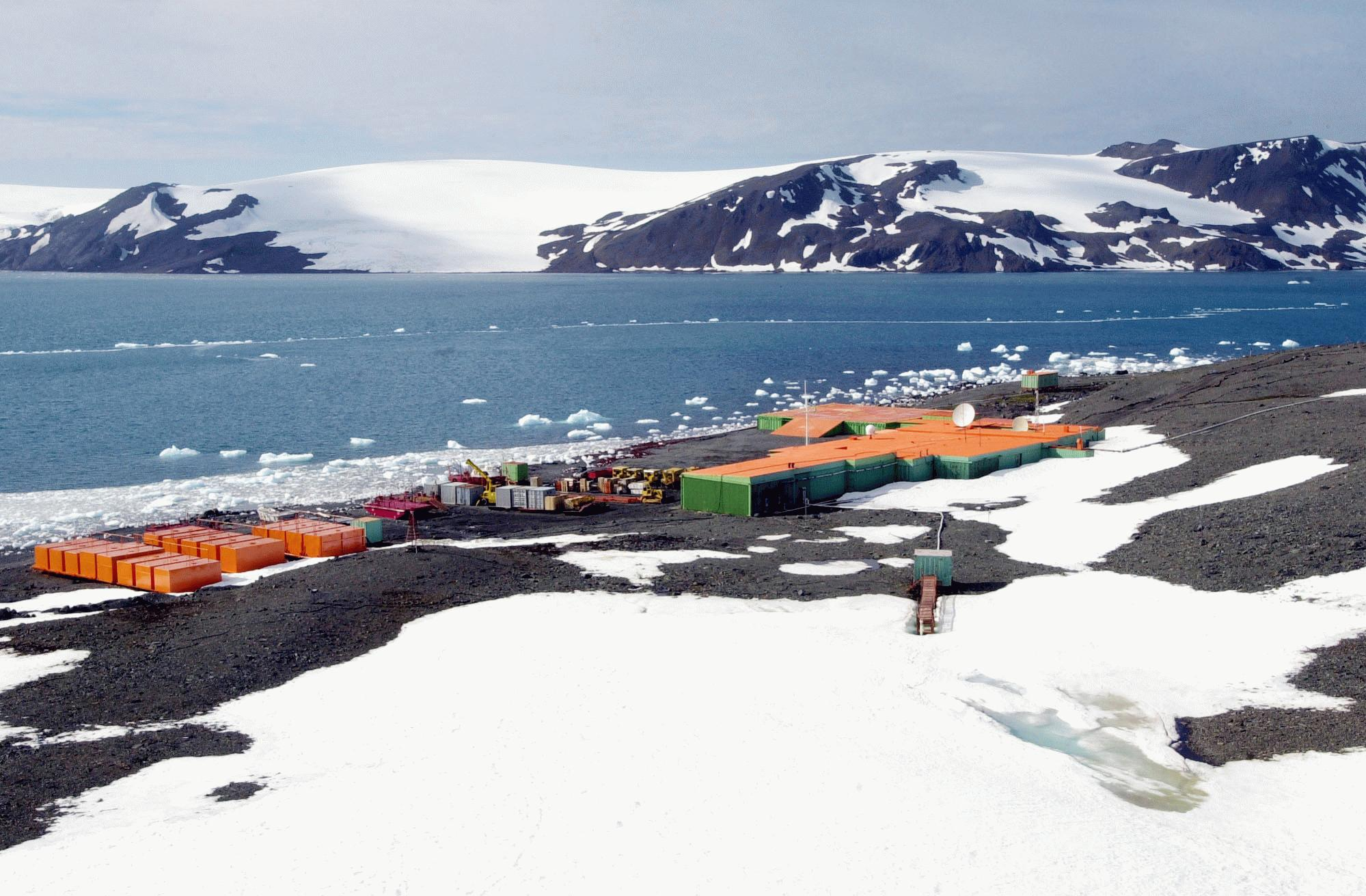
The station before the 2012 fire.

The station was built on the site of the old British "Base G", and the weathered wooden structures of the old base made a sharp contrast with the bright green and orange metal structures of the Brazilian station, which was first set up on 6 February 1984. Above the site of the base there is a small cemetery with five crosses: three of them are the graves of British Antarctic Survey (BAS) personnel; the fourth commemorates a BAS base leader lost at sea, and the fifth cross is the grave of a Brazilian radio operator sergeant who died of a heart attack in 1990.

=== 2012 fire ===
On 25 February 2012, an explosion in the machine room that housed the station's generators ignited a fire that, according to the Brazilian navy, destroyed approximately 70% of the complex. Two soldiers, originally reported as missing by the Brazilian navy, were found dead in the debris of the station after the fire, while a third one sustained non-life-threatening injuries. Material damage to the base was calculated at US$12.4 million. At the time of the incident, the Brazilian government estimated it would take two years to rebuild the research station.

In August 2012, the station was fully dismantled, with approximately 800 tonnes of debris being shipped back to Brazil. The Brazilian government released U$20 million for the construction of 1,000 square metres (11,000 ft^{2}) of emergency modules to temporarily house researchers until a permanent station had been built. The construction of the temporary station was completed in May 2013.

On 15 April 2013, the Brazilian Navy announced it had chosen the winning design for the new Comandante Ferraz base. The winning proposal went to the Curitiba-based Estúdio 41 architecture firm. The new station will extend 3,200 square metres (34,000 ft^{2}) and will accommodate 64 people. The cost of the project was approximately US$100 million. Approximately 200 Chinese workers from CEIEC were at the construction site. The new and modern station opened in January 2020.

=== New base ===
In January 2020, the new station was successfully completed. The opening ceremony, originally scheduled to take place on 14 January, was postponed until the following day due to inadequate weather conditions hampering the transport of dignitaries from Punta Arenas, Chile, to Antarctica. On 15 January, the opening ceremony was held in the presence of the Vice President of Brazil Hamilton Mourão among other guests. “Brazil is back in the Antarctic with great force,” said the Science and Technology Minister Marcos Pontes, Brazil's only astronaut. Pontes said the new 4,500-square-metre (48,375-sq-foot) facility was bigger and safer, with 17 laboratories, a heliport, and other advances. Scientists will use the base to study microbiology, glaciers, and climate, among other areas.

== Climate ==
With all 12 months having an average temperature below 10 °C (50 °F), Comandante Ferraz Antarctic Station features a tundra climate (Köppen ET). The average temperature at the station is of about -1.8 °C; however, in the region of the Thiel Mountains, where the new station Criosfera 1 was built, the temperature may drop to -35 °C. (Note: Caldas, Mariana. "Brasil terá pela primeira vez uma estação científica no interior da Antártida" (in Portuguese). UOL. The module Criosfera 1 is located at 84 degrees south latitude, about 500 miles from the geographic South Pole, while the Comandante Ferraz station is now located at 62 degrees south latitude.)

Climate data for Comandante Ferraz Antarctic Station
Month	Jan	Feb	Mar	Apr	May	Jun	Jul	Aug	Sep	Oct	Nov	Dec	Year
Record high °C (°F)	14.9 (58.8)	10.8 (51.4)	11.7 (53.1)	10.9 (51.6)	7.5 (45.5)	9.5 (49.1)	7.5 (45.5)	7.8 (46.0)	7.7 (45.9)	10.1 (50.2)	14.4 (57.9)	12.7 (54.9)	14.9 (58.8)
Mean daily maximum °C (°F)	4.3 (39.7)	4.2 (39.6)	3.3 (37.9)	0.9 (33.6)	−0.5 (31.1)	−2.6 (27.3)	−3.4 (25.9)	−2.6 (27.3)	−1.2 (29.8)	0.1 (32.2)	2.1 (35.8)	3.3 (37.9)	0.7 (33.3)
Daily mean °C (°F)	2.2 (36.0)	2.1 (35.8)	1.1 (34.0)	−1.6 (29.1)	−3.0 (26.6)	−5.4 (22.3)	−6.5 (20.3)	−5.4 (22.3)	−3.9 (25.0)	−2.0 (28.4)	−0.2 (31.6)	1.1 (34.0)	−1.8 (28.8)
Mean daily minimum °C (°F)	0.5 (32.9)	0.4 (32.7)	−1.0 (30.2)	−3.8 (25.2)	−5.6 (21.9)	−7.8 (18.0)	−9.6 (14.7)	−8.2 (17.2)	−6.6 (20.1)	−4.1 (24.6)	−2.1 (28.2)	−0.8 (30.6)	−4.1 (24.6)
Record low °C (°F)	−5.2 (22.6)	−7.0 (19.4)	−10.2 (13.6)	−18.6 (−1.5)	−23.5 (−10.3)	−23.8 (−10.8)	−27.7 (−17.9)	−28.5 (−19.3)	−22.2 (−8.0)	−16.1 (3.0)	−12.0 (10.4)	−11.3 (11.7)	−28.5 (−19.3)
Source: CPTEC/INPE

== Activity ==
Comandante Ferraz Lighthouse
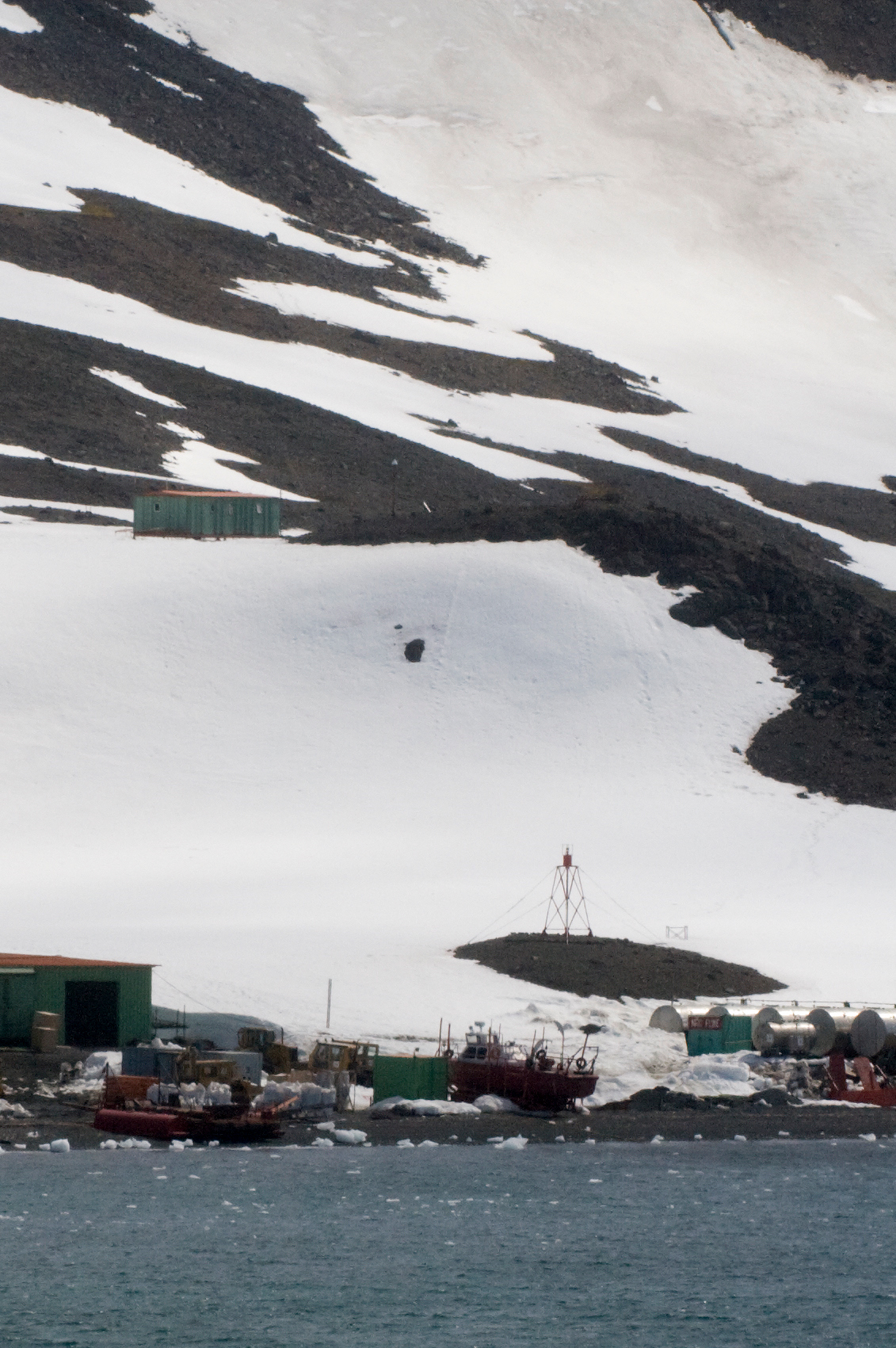
- Location: Martel Inlet; Comandante Ferraz Station; King George Island; Antarctica
- Coordinates: 62°05′02″S 58°23′31″W

Tower
- Constructed: 2007
- Foundation: concrete base
- Construction: metal skeletal tower
- Height: 4 metres (13 ft)
- Shape: square pyramidal skeletal tower with balcony and light
- Markings: red and white tower, red lantern
- Power source: solar power
- Operator: Proantar

Light
- Focal height: 14 metres (46 ft)
- Range: 10 nautical miles (19 km; 12 mi)
- Characteristic: Iso R 2s.

The main objective of the Brazilian Antarctic program lies on climate change research, such as global warming, the greenhouse effect, ozone depletion and the rising level of the oceans. The personnel working at the station collect samples of pollutants which often come from overseas. They also carry out research in meteorology, continental and marine geology, oceanography, astrophysics, geomagnetism, and nuclear geophysics.

=== Outposts ===
Near the station are located several smaller structures which administratively and logistically depend on the main base:

- Refuge Astronomer Cruls.
- Refuge Emílio Goeldi.
- Refuge Engineer Wiltgen (dismantled).
- Refuge Pe. Balduino Rambo (dismantled).

== See also ==
- List of lighthouses in Antarctica
- List of Antarctic research stations
- List of Antarctic field camps
- Brazilian Antarctic Program
