= Redfearn Island =

Island in the Donskiye Islands group in Princess Elizabeth Land, Antarctica

- Location within Antarctica
- Etymology: H.T. Redfearn, diesel mechanic at Davis Station

Geography
- Location: Princess Elizabeth Land
- Coordinates: 68°37′S 77°53′E
- Archipelago: Donskiye Islands

Redfearn Island (68°37′S 77°53′E) is a small island in the Donskiye Islands group lying just west of Warriner Island and 1 nautical mile (1.9 km) off the west end of Breidnes Peninsula, Vestfold Hills. It was first plotted, mistakenly, as two small islands by Norwegian cartographers working from air photos taken by the Lars Christensen Expedition of 1936–37. Later it was replotted as a single island from ANARE (Australian National Antarctic Research Expeditions) air photos taken jn 1957–58. The island was named by the Antarctic Names Committee of Australia (ANCA) for H.T. Redfearn, diesel mechanic at Davis Station, in 1961.

== See also ==
- List of Antarctic and Subantarctic islands
