= Lugg Island =

Island of Antarctica

- Location within Antarctica

Geography
- Location: Antarctica
- Coordinates: 68°32′S 77°57′E

Administration
- Administered under the Antarctic Treaty System

Demographics
- Population: Uninhabited

Lugg Island is a small island in the Donskiye Islands group lying 2 km (1.2 mi) north-west of Lake Island, off the west end of Breidnes Peninsula, Vestfold Hills, Antarctica. It was first plotted from aerial photos taken by the Lars Christensen Expedition, 1936–37, and was named by the Antarctic Names Committee of Australia for Dr. D. Lugg, medical officer at Davis Station in 1963, who visited the island for biological studies.

== Important Bird Area ==
The island forms part of the Magnetic Island and nearby islands Important Bird Area (IBA), comprising Magnetic, Turner, Waterhouse, Lugg, Boyd and Bluff Islands, along with intervening islands and marine area. The site was designated an IBA by BirdLife International because it supports large colonies of Adélie penguins totalling some 29,000 breeding pairs, based on 2012 satellite imagery.

== See also ==
- List of Antarctic and Subantarctic islands
