= Turner Island (Antarctica) =

Island of Antarctica

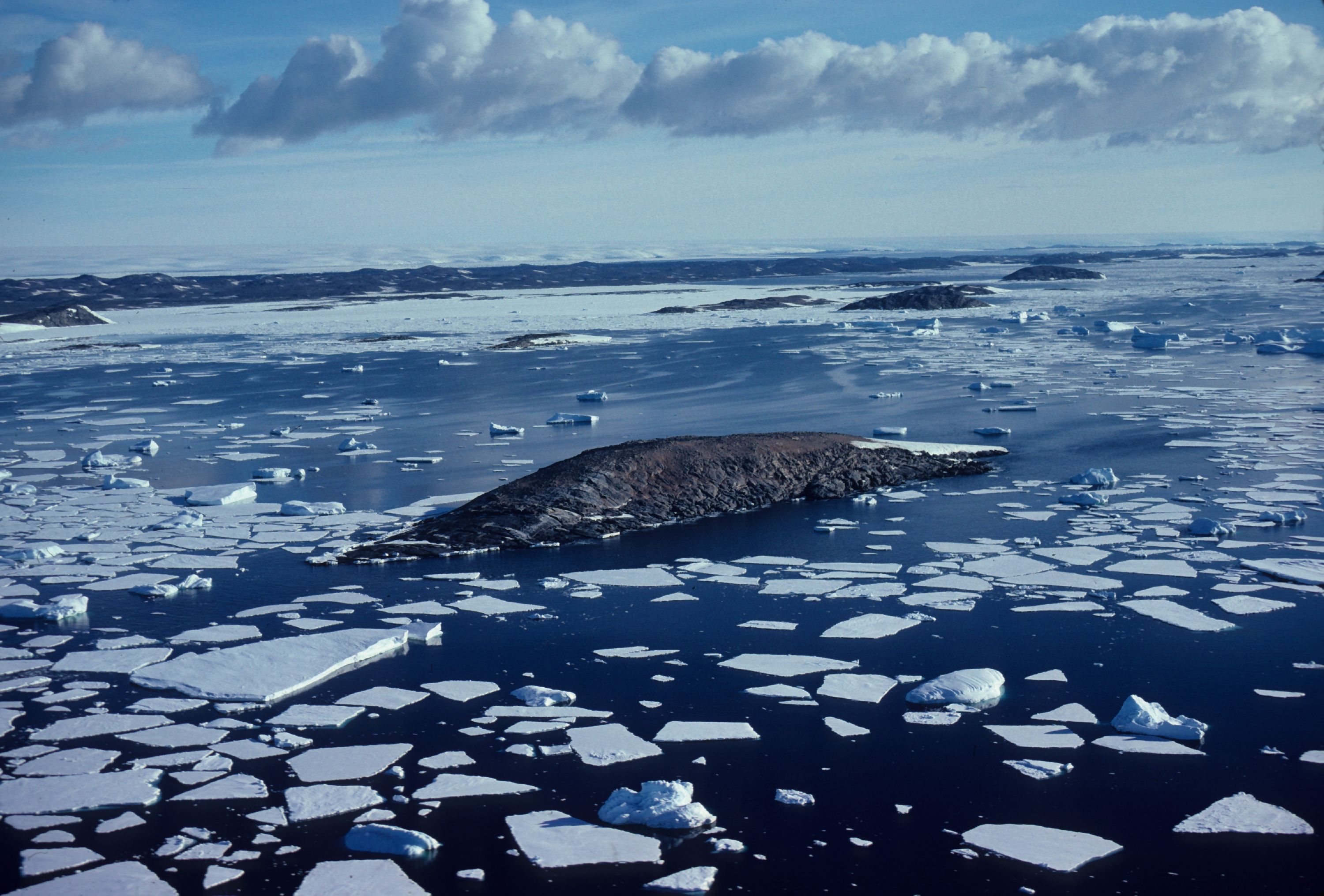

- Location within Antarctica

Geography
- Location: Princess Elizabeth Land, Antarctica
- Coordinates: 68°33′00″S 77°53′00″E
- Highest elevation: 40 m (130 ft)

Administration
- Administered under the Antarctic Treaty System

Demographics
- Population: Uninhabited

Turner Island is an island in the Donskiye Islands group lying 0.9 km (0.6 mi) north-west of Bluff Island and 4.6 km (2.9 mi) west of Breidnes Peninsula, Vestfold Hills, in Prydz Bay, Princess Elizabeth Land, Antarctica.

== Discovery and naming ==
The island was mapped by Norwegian cartographers from aerial photos taken by the Lars Christensen Expedition, 1936–37. It was remapped by ANARE (Australian National Antarctic Research Expeditions) (1957–58) and named for P.B. Turner, a radio officer at Davis Station in 1958.

== Important Bird Area ==
The island forms part of the Magnetic Island and nearby islands Important Bird Area (IBA), comprising Magnetic, Turner, Waterhouse, Lugg, Boyd and Bluff Islands, along with intervening islands and marine area. The site was designated an IBA by BirdLife International because it supports large colonies of Adélie penguins totalling some 29,000 breeding pairs, based on 2012 satellite imagery.

== See also ==
- List of Antarctic and Subantarctic islands
