= Greben =

Greben (meaning "ridge" in Slavic languages) can refer to the following toponyms:

- Greben (Višegrad), village in Bosnia and Herzegovina
- Greben (mountain), mountain in Serbia and Bulgaria
- Greben Hill, mountain in the Antarctica
- Veliki Greben, mountain in northeastern Serbia
- Greben' Island, minor island in Antarctica
- Greben Island, minor island in Severnaya Zemlya Islands in the Russian Arctic
