= Oldroyd Island =

Island in Princess Elizabeth Land, Antarctica

- Location in Antarctica

Geography
- Location: Eastern Prydz Bay, Antarctica
- Coordinates: 68°32′17.5″S 77°54′06.1″E
- Highest elevation: 13.5 m (44.3 ft)

Administration
- None
- Administered under: the Antarctic Treaty System

Demographics
- Population: Uninhabited

Oldroyd Island is a small island off the Vestfold Hills in Princess Elizabeth Land, Antarctica. It lies in the eastern part of Prydz Bay, approximately 0.5 km (0.31 mi) northwest of Magnetic Island. The island has a recorded elevation of 13.5 m (44 ft).

== Geography ==
The Australian Antarctic Gazetteer places the island at 68°32′17.5″ south and 77°54′06.1″ east, based on the Vestfold Hills topographic dataset produced by the Australian Antarctic Division. The reported coordinates are accurate to approximately 30 m (98 ft), while the reported elevation is accurate to approximately 5 m (16 ft).

Oldroyd Island lies immediately offshore from the Vestfold Hills, an approximately 400 km^{2} (150 sq mi) ice-free coastal region of East Antarctica. The Vestfold Hills are characterised by low hills of ancient gneiss, glacial deposits, lakes and marine inlets. The region is bordered by the Antarctic ice sheet to the east and the Sørsdal Glacier to the south.

== Mapping and name ==
Norwegian cartographers first mapped the island using aerial photographs taken during the Lars Christensen Expedition of 1936–1937. It was subsequently remapped during the 1957–1958 Australian National Antarctic Research Expeditions survey of the region.

The Antarctic Names Committee of Australia named the island after K. C. Oldroyd, who served as a radio weather observer at nearby Davis Station in 1960. The name is included in both the Australian Antarctic Gazetteer and the SCAR Composite Gazetteer of Antarctica.

== See also ==
- List of Antarctic and subantarctic islands
- List of Antarctic islands south of 60° S
- Geography of Antarctica
