= Lucas Island =

Island of Antarctica

- Location within Antarctica

Geography
- Location: Antarctica
- Coordinates: 68°30′S 77°57′E
- Length: 0.6 km (0.37 mi)
- Width: 0.2 km (0.12 mi)
- Highest elevation: 40 m (130 ft)

Administration
- Administered under the Antarctic Treaty System

Demographics
- Population: Uninhabited

Lucas Island is a small island lying just west of the Vestfold Hills, Antarctica, 4 kilometres (2 nmi) north-west of Plog Island. It was mapped by Norwegian cartographers from air photos taken by the Lars Christensen Expedition (1936–37) and called "Plogsteinen" (the plow stone). It was mapped by the Australian National Antarctic Research Expeditions in 1958 and renamed for W.C. Lucas, a diesel mechanic at Davis Station, 1957.

== Important Bird Area ==
A 9 ha site comprising the whole island has also been designated an Important Bird Area (IBA) by BirdLife International because it supports about 14,000 breeding pairs of Adélie penguins.

== See also ==
- List of Antarctic and Subantarctic islands
