= Lake Island (Antarctica) =

Island in Antarctica

- Location within Antarctica

Geography
- Location: Antarctica
- Coordinates: 68°33′S 77°59′E

Administration
- Administered under the Antarctic Treaty System

Demographics
- Population: Uninhabited

Lake Island is a small island between Plog Island and Flutter Island, lying in Prydz Bay just west of Breidnes Peninsula, Vestfold Hills. It was mapped by Norwegian cartographers from air photos taken by the Lars Christensen Expedition, 1936–37. It was remapped by Australian National Antarctic Research Expeditions (ANARE) (1957–58) and so named because a lake occupies the northern part of the island.

== See also ==
- List of Antarctic and subantarctic islands
