= Zykov Island =

Island in Queen Mary Land, Antarctica

Zykov Island (66°32′S 93°1′E) is a small island between Fulmar Island and Buromskiy Island in the Haswell Islands, near Queen Mary Land on Antarctica. It was discovered and first mapped by the Australasian Antarctic Expedition under Douglas Mawson of 1911–14 but mistakenly identified as part of Fulmar Island. Remapped by the Soviet expedition of 1956, it was named for Ye. Zykov, a student navigator who died in Antarctica on 3 February 1957.

Research has been done around the island. Because of its remoteness, the undisturbed benthic zone of Zykov Island was studied from 1970 to 1972, with underwater dives and sample collections. A decade later, the University of Canterbury studied Paramoera walkeri on Zykov Island and elsewhere in the Antarctic.

== See also ==
- List of antarctic and sub-antarctic islands
- Zykov Glacier, also named for Ye. Zykov.
