= Dingle Lake =

- Location within Antarctica
- Location: Breidnes Peninsula, Antarctica
- Coordinates: 68°34′S 78°4′E
- Type: Glacial lake and Salt lake

Dingle Lake is a saltwater glacial lake lying just west of Stinear Lake, on the Breidnes Peninsula, Vestfold Hills of Princess Elizabeth Land in Antarctica. It was mapped by Norwegian cartographers from air photos taken by the Lars Christensen Expedition, 1936–37, and was named by the Antarctic Names Committee of Australia for Robert Dingle, Officer in Charge at Davis Station in 1957.
