= Vkhodnoy Island =

- Island
- Location within Antarctica
- Coordinates: 66°32′S 92°58′E
- Territory: Antarctica

Vkhodnoy Island is a small island in the Haswell Islands, lying 0.5 nautical miles (0.9 km) southwest of Tokarev Island and 1.4 nautical miles (2.6 km) northwest of Mabus Point.

== History ==
Plotted by Gardner Dean Blodgett (1955) from aerial photographs taken by U.S. Navy Operation Highjump (1946–47). Photographed by the Soviet Antarctic Expedition (1956) and shown on their map as Ostrov Vkhodnoy (entrance island), presumably because of its location along the ship route to Mabus Point and Mirnyy Station.

== See also ==
- List of antarctic and sub-antarctic islands
