= Tyulen'i Islands =

- Island group
- Location within Antarctica
- Coordinates: 66°33′S 92°57′E
- Country: Antarctica

Tyulen'i Islands is a group of about three very small islands in the south part of the Haswell Islands, located 1 nautical mile (1.9 km) off the mainland and 1.2 nautical miles (2.2 km) west of Mabus Point.

The islands are aligned east–west and lie just west of Stroiteley Islands.

== History ==
The group was plotted by Gardner Dean Blodgett (1955) from aerial photographs taken by U.S. Navy Operation Highjump (1946–47). It was photographed by the Soviet Antarctic Expedition (1956) and named Ostrova Tyulen'i (seal islands).

== See also ==
- List of antarctic and sub-antarctic islands
- Northern fur seal
