= Magnetic Island (Antarctica) =

Island of Antarctica

- Location within Antarctica

Geography
- Location: Antarctica
- Coordinates: 68°33′S 77°54′E
- Highest elevation: 58 m (190 ft)

Administration
- Administered under the Antarctic Treaty System

Demographics
- Population: Uninhabited

Magnetic Island is a small island in the Donskiye Islands group in the Donskiye Islands group lying 500 m north-east of Turner Island, off the Breidnes Peninsula, Vestfold Hills, Princess Elizabeth Land, Antarctica.

== Discovery and naming ==
The island was mapped by Norwegian cartographers from aerial photos taken by the Lars Christensen Expedition, 1936–37. It was visited by an Australian National Antarctic Research Expeditions (ANARE) party led by Phillip Law on March 3, 1954, and named because magnetic observations taken there by J. Brooks showed the declination to be anomalous.

== Important Bird Area ==
The island forms part of the Magnetic Island and nearby islands Important Bird Area (IBA), comprising Magnetic, Turner, Waterhouse, Lugg, Boyd and Bluff Islands, along with intervening islands and marine area. The site was designated an IBA by BirdLife International because it supports large colonies of Adélie penguins totalling some 29,000 breeding pairs, based on 2012 satellite imagery.

== See also ==
- List of Antarctic and Subantarctic islands
