= Historic Sites and Monuments in Antarctica =

List of historic sites and monunments

A Historic Site or Monument (HSM) is a protected location of historic interest on the continent of Antarctica, or on its adjacent islands. The list of historic sites was first drawn up in 1972, and has since expanded to cover 96 sites, with the most recent listed in 2024. Five sites have been removed from the list for various reasons.

Historic Sites and Monuments are protected under the Antarctic Treaty System, as one of three classes of Antarctic Protected Areas.

The criteria for listing a site are that it should fulfil one or more of the following criteria:

1. a particular historic event occurred at that location;
2. it is associated with a significant person in Antarctic history;
3. it is associated with a significant feat of "endurance or achievement";
4. it is representative of a wider activity "important in the development and knowledge of Antarctica";
5. the building itself is of intrinsic technical, historical, cultural or architectural significance;
6. it has educational potential about "significant human activities" in Antarctica; or that
7. it has "symbolic or commemorative value for people of many nations"

== List of HSMs ==
Number	Name	Description	Adopted	Coordinates	Estimated area	Image
HSM-1	South Pole Flag Mast	Flag mast erected in December 1965 at the South Geographical Pole by the First Argentine Overland Polar Expedition.	(1972) Rec VII-9	90°00′S 0°00′E		Upload another image
HSM-2	Fukushima's Rock Cairn	Rock cairn and plaques at Syowa Station in memory of Shin Fukushima, a member of the 4th Japanese Antarctic Research Expedition, who died in October 1960 while performing official duties. The cairn was erected on 11 January 1961, by his colleagues. Some of his ashes repose in the cairn.	(1972) Rec VII-9	69°00′00″S 39°35′00″E		Upload another image
HSM-3	Mawson's Rock Cairn, Proclamation Island	Rock cairn and plaque on Proclamation Island, Enderby Land, erected in January 1930 by Sir Douglas Mawson. The cairn and plaque commemorate the landing on Proclamation Island of Sir Douglas Mawson with a party from the British, Australian and New Zealand Antarctic Research Expedition of 1929–31.	(1972) Rec VII-9	65°51′00″S 53°41′00″E		Upload another image See more images
HSM-4	Lenin's Bust	Station building to which a bust of V.I. Lenin is fixed, together with a plaque in memory of the conquest of the Pole of Inaccessibility by Soviet Antarctic explorers in 1958.	(1972) Rec VII-9	83°06′00″S 54°58′00″E		Upload another image See more images
HSM-5	Mawson's Rock Cairn, Cape Bruce	Rock cairn and plaque at Cape Bruce, Mac. Robertson Land, erected in February 1931 by Sir Douglas Mawson. The cairn and plaque commemorate the landing on Cape Bruce of Sir Douglas Mawson with a party from the British, Australian and New Zealand Antarctic Research Expedition of 1929–31.	(1972) Rec VII-9	67°25′00″S 60°47′00″E		Upload another image See more images
HSM-6	Wilkins's Rock Cairn	Rock cairn at Walkabout Rocks, Vestfold Hills, Princess Elizabeth Land, erected in 1939 by Sir Hubert Wilkins. The cairn houses a canister containing a record of his visit.	(1972) Rec VII-9	68°22′00″S 78°33′00″E		Upload Photo
HSM-7	Khmara's Stone	Stone with inscribed plaque, erected at Mirny Observatory, Mabus Point, in memory of driver-mechanic Ivan Khmara who perished on fast ice in the performance of official duties in 1956.	(1972) Rec VII-9	66°32′S 93°00′E		Upload another image See more images
HSM-8	Shcheglov's Monument	Metal monument-sledge at Mirny Observatory, Mabus Point, with plaque in memory of driver-mechanic Anatoly Shcheglov who perished in the performance of official duties.	(1972) Rec VII-9	66°35′S 92°58′E		Upload Photo
HSM-9	Soviet Expedition Cemetery	Cemetery on Buromskiy Island, near Mirny Observatory, in which are buried Soviet, Czechoslovak and West German citizens, members of Soviet Antarctic Expeditions, who perished in the performance of official duties on 3 August 1960.	(1972) Rec VII-9	66°32′00″S 93°01′00″E		Upload another image
HSM-10	Oasis Station Observatory	Building (magnetic observatory) at Dobrowolski Station, Bunger Hills, with plaque in memory of the opening of Oasis Station in 1956.	(1972) Rec VII-9	66°16′30″S 100°45′00″E		Upload Photo
HSM-11	Vostok Station Tractor	Heavy tractor at Vostok Station with plaque in memory of the opening of the station in 1957.	(1972) Rec VII-9	78°28′00″S 106°48′00″E		Upload Photo
HSM-14	Inexpressible Island Ice Cave	Site of ice cave at Inexpressible Island, Terra Nova Bay, constructed in March 1912 by Victor Campbell's Northern Party, British Antarctic Expedition, 1910–13. The party spent the winter of 1912 in this ice cave. A wooden sign, plaque and seal bones remain at the site.	(1972) Rec VII-9	74°54′00″S 163°43′00″E		Upload another image
HSM-15	Shackleton's Hut	Hut at Cape Royds, Ross Island, built in February 1908 by the British Antarctic Expedition of 1907–09, led by Sir Ernest Shackleton. Restored in January 1961 by the Antarctic Division of New Zealand Department of Scientific and Industrial Research. Site incorporated within ASPA 157	(1972) Rec VII-9	77°33′00″S 166°10′00″E		Upload another image See more images
HSM-16	Terra Nova Hut	Hut at Cape Evans, Ross Island, built in January 1911 by the British Antarctic Expedition of 1910–1913, led by Captain Robert F. Scott. Restored in January 1961 by the Antarctic Division of New Zealand Department of Scientific and Industrial Research. Site incorporated within ASPA 155	(1972) Rec VII-9	77°38′00″S 166°24′00″E		Upload another image See more images
HSM-17	Cross on Wind Vane Hill	Cross on Wind Vane Hill, Cape Evans, Ross Island, erected by the Ross Sea Party, led by Captain Aeneas Mackintosh, of Sir Ernest Shackleton's Imperial Trans-Antarctic Expedition of 1914–1916, in memory of three members of the party who died in the vicinity in 1916. Site incorporated within ASPA 155	(1972) Rec VII-9	77°38′00″S 166°24′00″E		Upload another image See more images
HSM-18	Scott's Discovery Hut	Hut at Hut Point, Ross Island, built in February 1902 by the British Antarctic Expedition of 1901–04, led by Captain Robert F. Scott. Partially restored in January 1964 by the New Zealand Antarctic Society, with assistance from the United States Government. Site incorporated within ASPA 158	(1972) Rec VII-9	77°50′00″S 166°37′00″E		Upload another image See more images
HSM-19	George Vince's Cross	Cross at Hut Point, Ross Island, erected in February 1904 by the British Antarctic Expedition of 1901–04, in memory of George Vince, a member of the expedition, who died in the vicinity.	(1972) Rec VII-9	77°50′00″S 166°37′00″E		Upload another image See more images
HSM-20	Observation Hill Cross	Cross on Observation Hill, Ross Island, erected in January 1913 by the British Antarctic Expedition of 1910–13, in memory of Captain Robert F. Scott's party which perished on the return journey from the South Pole in March 1912.	(1972) Rec VII-9	77°51′00″S 166°41′00″E		Upload another image
HSM-21	Wilson's Stone Igloo	Remains of stone hut at Cape Crozier, Ross Island, constructed in July 1911 by Edward Wilson's party of the British Antarctic Expedition (1910–13) during the winter journey to collect Emperor penguin eggs.	(1972) Rec VII-9	77°31′00″S 169°22′00″E		Upload Photo
HSM-22	Borchgrevink's huts	Three huts and associated historic relics at Cape Adare. Two were built in February 1899 during the British Antarctic (Southern Cross) Expedition, 1898–1900, led by Carsten E. Borchgrevink. The third was built in February 1911 by Robert F. Scott's Northern Party, led by Victor L.A.Campbell. Scott's Northern Party hut has largely collapsed with only the porch standing in 2002. Site incorporated within ASPA 159.	(1972) Rec VII-9	71°18′S 170°12′E		Upload another image See more images
HSM-23	Hanson's Grave	Grave at Cape Adare of Norwegian biologist Nicolai Hanson, a member of the British Antarctic (Southern Cross) Expedition, 1898–1900, led by Carsten E. Borchgrevink. A large boulder marks the head of the grave with the grave itself outlined in white quartz stones. A cross and plaque are attached to the boulder.	(1972) Rec VII-9	71°17′00″S 170°13′00″E		Upload another image
HSM-24	Amundsen's cairn	Rock cairn, known as ‘Amundsen's cairn', on Mount Betty, Queen Maud Range erected by Roald Amundsen on 6 January 1912, on his way back to Framheim from the South Pole.	(1972) Rec VII-9	85°11′00″S 163°45′00″W		Upload Photo
HSM-26	San Martin abandoned Station	Abandoned installations of Argentine Station ‘General San Martín' on Barry Island, Debenham Islands, Marguerite Bay, with cross, flag mast, and monolith built in 1951.	(1972) Rec VII-9	68°08′00″S 67°08′00″W		Upload another image See more images
HSM-27	Charcot's cairn 1909	Cairn with a replica of a lead plaque erected on Megalestris Hill, Petermann Island, in 1909 by the second French expedition led by Jean-Baptiste E. A. Charcot. The original plaque is in the reserves of the Museum National d'Histoire Naturelle (Paris).	(1972) Rec VII-9	65°10′00″S 64°09′00″W		Upload another image See more images
HSM-28	Charcot's cairn 1904	Rock cairn at Port Charcot, Booth Island, with wooden pillar and plaque inscribed with the names of the first French expedition led by Jean-Baptiste E. A. Charcot which wintered here in 1904 aboard Le Français.	(1972) Rec VII-9	65°03′00″S 64°01′00″W		Upload another image See more images
HSM-29	Lighthouse ‘Primero de Mayo'	Lighthouse named ‘Primero de Mayo' erected on Lambda Island, Melchior Islands, by Argentina in 1942. This was the first Argentine lighthouse in the Antarctic.	(1972) Rec VII-9	64°18′00″S 62°59′00″W		Upload another image
HSM-30	Shelter ‘Gabriel Gonzalez Videla'	Shelter at Paradise Harbour erected in 1950 near the Chilean Base ‘Gabriel Gonzalez Videla' to honour Gabriel Gonzalez Videla, the first Head of State to visit the Antarctic. The shelter is a representative example of pre-IGY activity and constitutes an important national commemoration.	(1972) Rec VII-9	64°49′00″S 62°51′00″W		Upload Photo
HSM-32	Prat Base Monolith	Concrete monolith erected in 1947, near Capitán Arturo Prat Base on Greenwich Island, South Shetland Islands. Point of reference for Chilean Antarctic hydrographic surveys. The monolith is representative of an important pre-IGY activity and is currently preserved and maintained by personnel from Prat Base.	(1972) Rec VII-9	62°28′00″S 59°40′00″W		Upload Photo
HSM-33	González Pacheco Shelter	Shelter and cross with plaque near Capitán Arturo Prat Base (Chile), Greenwich Island, South Shetland Islands. Named in memory of Lieutenant-Commander González Pacheco, who died in 1960 while in charge of the station. The monument commemorates events related to a person whose role and the circumstances of his death have a symbolic value and the potential to educate people about significant human activities in Antarctica.	(1972) Rec VII-9	62°29′00″S 59°40′00″W		Upload Photo
HSM-34	Arturo Prat's Bust, Antarctica	Bust at Capitán Arturo Prat Base (Chile), Greenwich Island, South Shetland Islands, of the Chilean naval hero Arturo Prat, erected in 1947. The monument is representative of pre-IGY activities and has symbolic value in the context of Chilean presence in Antarctica.	(1972) Rec VII-9	62°29′S 59°40′W		Upload another image See more images
HSM-35	Virgin of Carmen Statue, Antarctica	Wooden cross and statue of the Virgin of Carmen erected in 1947 near Capitán Arturo Prat Base (Chile), Greenwich Island, South Shetland Islands. The monument is representative of pre-IGY activities and has a particularly symbolic and architectural value.	(1972) Rec VII-9	62°29′00″S 59°40′00″W		Upload Photo
HSM-36	Dallman Expedition Plaque	Replica of a metal plaque erected by Eduard Dallmann at Potter Cove, King George Island, to commemorate the visit of his German expedition on 1 March 1874 on board Grönland.	(1972) Rec VII-9	62°14′00″S 58°39′00″W		Upload Photo
HSM-37	Bernardo O'Higgins Statue, Antarctica	Statue erected in 1948 at General Bernardo O'Higgins Base (Chile), Trinity Peninsula, of Bernardo O'Higgins, the first ruler of Chile to envisage the importance of Antarctica. This monument is representative of pre-IGY activities in Antarctica and has a symbolic meaning in the history of Antarctic exploration since it was during O'Higgins' government that the vessel Dragon landed on the coast of the Antarctic Peninsula in 1820.	(1972) Rec VII-9	63°19′00″S 57°54′00″W		Upload Photo
HSM-38	Nordenskjöld's Hut	Wooden hut on Snow Hill Island built in February 1902 by the main party of the Swedish South Polar Expedition led by Otto Nordenskjöld.	(1972) Rec VII-9	64°22′00″S 56°59′00″W		Upload another image
HSM-39	Hope Bay Hut	Stone hut at Hope Bay, Trinity Peninsula, built in January 1903 by a party of the Swedish South Polar Expedition.	(1972) Rec VII-9	63°24′00″S 56°59′00″W		Upload Photo
HSM-40	General San Martin's Bust, Antarctica	Bust of General San Martin, grotto with a statue of the Virgin of Lujan, and a flag mast at Base ‘Esperanza', Hope Bay, erected by Argentina in 1955; together with a graveyard with stele in memory of members of Argentine expeditions who died in the area.	(1972) Rec VII-9	63°24′00″S 56°59′00″W		Upload Photo
HSM-41	Paulet Island Hut	Stone hut on Paulet Island built in February 1903 by survivors of the wrecked vessel Antarctic under Captain Carl A. Larsen, members of the Swedish South Polar Expedition led by Otto Nordenskjöld, together with a grave of a member of the expedition and the rock cairn built by the survivors of the wreck at the highest point of the island to draw the attention of rescue expeditions.	(1972) Rec VII-9	63°34′00″S 55°45′00″W		Upload another image
HSM-42	Scotia Bay huts	Area of Scotia Bay, Laurie Island, South Orkney Island, in which are found: stone hut built in 1903 by the Scottish Antarctic Expedition led by William S. Bruce; the Argentine meteorological hut and magnetic observatory, built in 1905 and known as Moneta House; and a graveyard with twelve graves, the earliest of which dates from 1903.	(1972) Rec VII-9	60°46′00″S 44°40′00″W		Upload another image See more images
HSM-43	General Belgrano Cross	Cross erected in 1955, at a distance of 1,300 metres north-east of the Argentine General Belgrano I Station (Argentina) and subsequently moved to Belgrano II Station (Argentina), Nunatak Bertrab, Confin Coast, Coats Land in 1979.	(1972) Rec VII-9	77°52′00″S 34°37′00″W		Upload Photo
HSM-44	Dakshin Gangotri Plaque	Plaque erected at the temporary Indian station ‘Dakshin Gangotri', Princess Astrid Kyst, Dronning Maud Land, listing the names of the First Indian Antarctic Expedition which landed nearby on 9 January 1982.	(1983) Rec XII-7	70°45′00″S 11°38′00″E		Upload Photo
HSM-45	Gerlache Expedition Plaque	Plaque on Brabant Island, on Metchnikoff Point, mounted at a height of 70 m on the crest of the moraine separating this point from the glacier and bearing the following inscription: This monument was built by François de Gerlache and other members of the Joint Services Expedition 1983–85 to commemorate the first landing on Brabant Island by the Belgian Antarctic Expedition, 1897–99: Adrien de Gerlache (Belgium) leader, Roald Amundsen (Norway), Henryk Arctowski (Poland), Frederick Cook (USA) and Emile Danco (Belgium) camped nearby from 30 January to 6 February 1898.	(1985) Rec XIII-16	64°02′00″S 62°34′00″W		Upload Photo
HSM-46	Remains of Port-Martin base	All the buildings and installations of Port-Martin base, Terre Adélie constructed in 1950 by the 3rd French expedition in Terre Adélie and partly destroyed by fire during the night of 23 to 24 January 1952.	(1985) Rec XIII-16	66°49′00″S 141°24′00″E		Upload Photo
HSM-47	Base Marret	Wooden building called ‘Base Marret' on the Ile des Pétrels, Terre Adélie, where seven men under the command of Mario Marret overwintered in 1952 following the fire at Port Martin Base.	(1985) Rec XIII-16	66°40′00″S 140°01′00″E		Upload Photo
HSM-48	Prudhomme's Cross	Iron cross on the North-East headland of the Ile des Pétrels, Terre Adélie, dedicated as a memorial to André Prudhomme, head meteorologist in the 3rd International Geophysical Year expedition who disappeared during a blizzard on 7 January 1959.	(1985) Rec XIII-16	66°40′00″S 140°01′00″E		Upload Photo
HSM-49	Bunger Hill Pillar	The concrete pillar erected by the First Polish Antarctic Expedition at Dobrowolski Station on the Bunger Hill to measure acceleration due to gravity g = 982,439.4 mgal ±0.4 mgal in relation to Warsaw, according to the Potsdam system, in January 1959.	(1985) Rec XIII-16	66°16′00″S 100°45′00″E		Upload Photo
HSM-50	Polish Eagle Plaque	A brass plaque bearing the Polish Eagle, the national emblem of Poland, the dates 1975 and 1976, and a commemorative text in Polish, English and Russian	(1985) Rec XIII-16	62°12′00″S 59°01′00″W		Upload another image
HSM-51	Puchalski Grave	The grave of Wlodzimierz Puchalski, surmounted by an iron cross, on a hill to the south of Arctowski station on King George Island. W. Puchalski was an artist and a producer of documentary nature films, who died on 19 January 1979 while working at the station.	(1985) Rec XIII-16	62°13′00″S 58°28′00″W		Upload Photo
HSM-52	Great Wall Station Monolith	Monolith erected to commemorate the establishment on 20 February 1985 by the People's Republic of China of the ‘Great Wall Station' on Fildes Peninsula, King George Island, in the South Shetland Islands. Engraved on the monolith is the following inscription in Chinese: ‘Great Wall Station, First Chinese Antarctic Research Expedition, 20 February 1985'.	(1985) Rec XIII-16	62°13′00″S 58°58′00″W		Upload Photo
HSM-53	Endurance Memorial Site	Bust of Captain Luis Alberto Pardo, monolith and plaques on Point Wild, Elephant Island, south Shetland Islands, celebrating the rescue of the survivors of the British ship Endurance by the Chilean Navy cutter Yelcho displaying the following words: Here on 30 August 1916, the Chilean Navy cutter Yelcho commanded by Pilot Luis Pardo Villalón rescued the 22 men from the Shackleton Expedition who survived the wreck of the ‘Endurance’ living for four and one half months in this Island. The Monolith and the plaques have been placed on Elephant Island and their replicas on the Chilean bases Capitan Arturo Prat (62°30'S, 59°49'W) and President Eduardo Frei (62°12'S, 62°12'W). Bronze busts of the pilot Luis Pardo Villalon were placed on the three above-mentioned monoliths during the XXIVth Chilean Antarctic Scientific Expedition in 1987–88.	(1987) Rec XIV-8	61°03′00″S 54°50′00″W		Upload another image
HSM-54	Richard Byrd's Bust, Antarctica	Richard E. Byrd Historic Monument, McMurdo Station, Antarctica. Bronze bust on black marble, 5ft high x 2ft square, on wood platform, bearing inscriptions describing the polar achievements of Richard Evelyn Byrd. Erected at McMurdo Station in 1965.	(1989) Rec XV-12	77°51′00″S 166°40′00″E		Upload another image See more images
HSM-55	East Base	East Base, Antarctica, Stonington Island. Buildings and artefacts at East Base, Stonington Island and their immediate environs. These structures were erected and used during two U.S. wintering expeditions: the Antarctic Service Expedition (1939–1941) and the Ronne Antarctic Research Expedition (1947–1948). The size of the historic area is approximately 1,000 metres in the north-south direction (from the beach to Northeast Glacier adjacent to Back Bay) and approximately 500 metres in the east-west direction.	(1989) Rec XV-12	68°11′00″S 67°00′00″W		Upload another image See more images
HSM-56	Waterboat Point Hut	Waterboat Point, Danco Coast, Antarctic Peninsula. The remains and immediate environs of the Waterboat Point hut. It was occupied by the UK two-man expedition of Thomas W. Bagshawe and Maxime C. Lester in 1921–22. Only the base of the boat, foundations of doorposts and an outline of the hut and extension still exist. It is situated close to the Chilean station ‘President Gabriel Gonzáles Videla'.	(1991) Rec XVI-11	64°49′00″S 62°51′00″W		Upload another image See more images
HSM-57	MacFarlane's Plaque	Commemorative plaque at ‘Yankee Bay' (Yankee Harbour), MacFarlane Strait, Greenwich Island, South Shetland Islands. Near a Chilean refuge. Erected to the memory of Captain Andrew MacFarlane, who in 1820 explored the Antarctic Peninsula area in the brigantine Dragon.	(1991) Rec XVI-11	62°32′00″S 59°45′00″W		Upload Photo
HSM-59	San Telmo Cairn	A cairn on Half Moon Beach, Cape Shirreff, Livingston Island, South Shetland Islands and a plaque on ‘Cerro Gaviota' opposite San Telmo Islets commemorating the officers, soldiers and seamen aboard the Spanish vessel San Telmo, which sank in September 1819; possibly the first people to live and die in Antarctica. Site incorporated within ASPA 149.	(1991) Rec XVI-11	62°28′00″S 60°46′00″W		Upload Photo
HSM-60	Corvette Uruguay Cairn	Wooden plaque and cairn located at Penguins Bay, southern coast of Seymour Island (Marambio), James Ross Archipelago. This plaque was placed on 10 November 1903 by the crew of a rescue mission of the Argentinian Corvette Uruguay in the site where they met the members of the Swedish expedition led by Dr Otto Nordenskjöld. The text of the wooden plaque reads as follows: "10.XI.1903 Uruguay (Argentine Navy) in its journey to give assistance to the Swedish Antarctic expedition." In January 1990, a rock cairn was erected by Argentina in memory of this event in the place where the plaque is located.	(1992) Rec XVII-3	64°16′00″S 56°39′00″W		Upload Photo
HSM-61	Port Lockroy	‘Base A' at Port Lockroy, Goudier Island, off Wiencke Island, Antarctic Peninsula. Of historic importance as an Operation Tabarin base from 1944 and for scientific research, including the first measurements of the ionosphere, and the first recording of an atmospheric whistler, from Antarctica. Port Lockroy was a key monitoring site during the International Geophysical Year of 1957/58.	(1995) ATCM XIX - M4	64°49′00″S 63°29′00″W		Upload another image See more images
HSM-62	Base F Wordie House	‘Base F (Wordie House)' on Winter Island, Argentine Islands. Of historic importance as an example of an early British scientific base.	(1995) ATCM XIX - M4	65°15′00″S 64°16′00″W		Upload another image See more images
HSM-63	Base Y	‘Base Y' on Horseshoe Island, Marguerite Bay, western Graham Land. Noteworthy as a relatively unaltered and completely equipped British scientific base of the late 1950s. ‘Blaiklock', the refuge hut nearby, is considered an integral part of the base.	(1995) ATCM XIX - M4	67°48′S 67°18′W		Upload another image See more images
HSM-64	Base E	‘Base E' on Stonington Island, Marguerite Bay, western Graham Land. Of historical importance in the early period of exploration and later British Antarctic Survey (BAS) history of the 1960s and 1970s.	(1995) ATCM XIX - M4	68°11′00″S 67°00′00″W		Upload Photo
HSM-65	Antarctic Message Post	Message post, Svend Foyn Island, Possession Islands. A pole with a box attached was placed on the island on 16 January 1895 during the whaling expedition of Henryk Bull and Captain Leonard Kristensen of the ship Antarctic. It was examined and found intact by the British Antarctic Expedition of 1898–1900 and then sighted from the beach by the USS Edisto in 1956 and USCGS Glacier in 1965.	(1995) ATCM XIX - M4	71°56′00″S 171°05′00″E		Upload Photo
HSM-66	Prestrud's Cairn	Prestrud's Cairn, Scott Nunataks, Alexandra Mountains, Edward VII Peninsula. The small rock cairn was erected at the foot of the main bluff on the north side of the nunataks by Lieutenant K. Prestrud on 3 December 1911 during the Norwegian Antarctic Expedition of 1910–1912.	(1995) ATCM XIX - M4	77°11′00″S 154°32′00″W		Upload Photo
HSM-67	Granite House	Rock shelter, ‘Granite House', Cape Geology, Granite Harbour. This shelter was constructed in 1911 for use as a field kitchen by Griffith Taylor's second geological excursion during the British Antarctic Expedition of 1910–1913. It was enclosed on three sides with granite boulder walls and used a sledge to support a seal-skin roof. The stone walls of the shelter have partially collapsed. The shelter contains corroded remnants of tins, a seal skin and some cord. The sledge is now located 50 m seaward of the shelter and consists of a few scattered pieces of wood, straps and buckles. Site incorporated within ASPA 154.	(1995) ATCM XIX - M4	77°00′00″S 162°32′00″E		Upload another image
HSM-68	Hells Gate Moraine depot site	Site of depot at Hells Gate Moraine, Inexpressible Island, Terra Nova Bay.This emergency depot consisted of a sledge loaded with supplies and equipment which was placed on 25 January 1913 by the British Antarctic Expedition, 1910–1913. The sledge and supplies were removed in 1994 in order to stabilize their deteriorating condition.	(1995) ATCM XIX - M4	74°52′00″S 163°50′00″E		Upload Photo
HSM-69	Discovery's Message Post	Message post at Cape Crozier, Ross Island, erected on 22 January 1902 by Captain Robert F. Scott's Discovery Expedition of 1901–04. It was to provide information for the expedition's relief ships, and held a metal message cylinder, which has since been removed. Site incorporated within ASPA 124	(1995) ATCM XIX - M4	77°27′00″S 169°16′00″E		Upload Photo
HSM-70	Scott's Message Post	Message post at Cape Wadworth, Coulman Island. A metal cylinder nailed to a red pole 8 m above sea level placed by Captain Robert F. Scott on 15 January 1902. He painted the rocks behind the post red and white to make it more conspicuous.	(1995) ATCM XIX - M4	73°19′00″S 169°47′00″E		Upload Photo
HSM-71	Whalers Bay	Whalers Bay, Deception Island, South Shetland Islands. The site comprises all pre-1970 remains on the shore of Whalers Bay, including those from the early whaling period (1906–12) initiated by Captain Adolfus Andresen of the Sociedad Ballenera de Magallanes, Chile; the remains of the Norwegian Hektor Whaling Station established in 1912 and all artefacts associated with its operation until 1931; the site of a cemetery with 35 burials and a memorial to ten men lost at sea; and the remains from the period of British scientific and mapping activity (1944–1969). The site also acknowledges and commemorates the historic value of other events that occurred there, from which nothing remains.	(1995) ATCM XIX - M4	62°59′00″S 60°34′00″W		Upload another image See more images
HSM-72	Mikkelsen's Cairn	Mikkelsen Cairn, Tryne Islands, Vestfold Hills. A rock cairn and a wooden mast erected by the landing party led by Captain Klarius Mikkelsen of the Norwegian whaling ship Thorshavn and including Caroline Mikkelsen, Captain Mikkelsen's wife, the first woman to set foot on East Antarctica. The cairn was discovered by Australian National Antarctic Research Expedition field parties in 1957 and again in 1995.	(1989) Rec XV-6	68°22′00″S 78°24′00″E		Upload Photo
HSM-73	Mount Erebus Cross	Memorial Cross for the 1979 Mount Erebus crash victims, Lewis Bay, Ross Island. A cross of stainless steel which was erected in January 1987 on a rocky promontory three kilometers from the Mount Erebus crash site in memory of the 257 people of different nationalities who lost their lives when the aircraft in which they were travelling crashed into the lower slopes of Mount Erebus, Ross Island. The cross was erected as a mark of respect and in remembrance of those who died in the tragedy.	(1981) Rec XI-3	77°25′00″S 167°27′00″E		Upload Photo
HSM-74	Hampson Cove	The cove on the south-west coast of Elephant Island, including the foreshore and the intertidal area, in which the wreckage of a large wooden sailing vessel, possibly the SS Hampson, is located.	(1998) ATCM XXII - M2	61°14′00″S 55°22′00″W		Upload Photo
HSM-75	Hut A, Scott Base	The A Hut of Scott Base, being the only existing Trans Antarctic Expedition 1956/1957 building in Antarctica sited at Pram Point, Ross Island, Ross Sea Region, Antarctica.	(2001) ATCM XXIV - M1	77°51′00″S 166°46′00″E		Upload another image See more images
HSM-76	Aguirre Cerda Station ruins	The ruins of the Base Pedro Aguirre Cerda Station, being a Chilean meteorological and volcanological center situated at Pendulum Cove, Deception Island, Antarctica, that was destroyed by volcanic eruptions in 1967 and 1969.	(2001) ATCM XXIV - M2	62°59′00″S 60°40′00″W		Upload another image See more images
HSM-77	Cape Denison	Cape Denison, Commonwealth Bay, George V Land, including Boat Harbour and the historic artefacts contained within its waters. This Site is contained within ASMA No. 3, designated by Measure 1 (2004). Part of this site is also contained within ASPA No. 162, designated by Measure 2 (2004).	(2004) ATCM XXVII - M3	67°00′30″S 142°39′40″E		Upload another image
HSM-78	Ninth Indian Expedition Plaque	Memorial plaque at India Point, Humboldt Mountains, Wohlthat Massif, central Dronning Maud Land erected in memory of three scientists of the Geological Survey of India (GSI) and a communication technician from the Indian Navy – all members of the ninth Indian Expedition to Antarctica, who sacrificed their lives in this mountain camp in an accident on 8 January 1990.	(2004) ATCM XXVII - M3	71°45′08″S 11°12′30″E		Upload Photo
HSM-79	Lillie Marleen Hut	Lillie Marleen Hut, Mt. Dockery, Everett Range, Northern Victoria Land. The hut was erected to support the work of the German Antarctic Northern Victoria Land Expedition (GANOVEX I) of 1979/1980. The hut, a bivouac container made of prefabricated fiberglass units insulated with polyurethane foam, was named after the Lillie Glacier and the song "Lillie Marleen". The hut is closely associated with the dramatic sinking of the expedition ship "Gotland II" during GANOVEX II in December 1981.	(2005) ATCM XXVIII - M5	71°12′00″S 164°31′00″E		Upload Photo
HSM-80	Polheim.	Amundsen's Tent. The tent was erected at 90° by the Norwegian group of explorers led by Roald Amundsen on their arrival at the South Pole on 14 December 1911. The tent is currently buried underneath the snow and ice in the vicinity of the South Pole.	(2005) ATCM XXVIII - M5	90°00′S 0°00′E		Upload another image See more images
HSM-81	Landing Rock	Rocher du Débarquement (Landing Rock), being a small island where Admiral Dumont D'Urville and his crew landed on 21 January 1840 when he discovered Terre Adélie.	(2006) ATCM XXIX - M3	66°36′30″S 140°04′25″E		Upload Photo
HSM-82	Antarctic Treaty Monument	This Monument is located near the Frei, Bellingshausen and Escudero bases, Fildes Peninsula, King George Island. The plaque at the foot of the monument commemorates the signatories of the Antarctic Treaty. This Monument has 4 plaques in the official languages of the Antarctic Treaty. The plaques were installed in February 2011 and read as follows: "This historic monument, dedicated to the memory of the signatories of the Antarctic Treaty, Washington D.C., 1959, is also a reminder of the legacy of the First and Second International Polar Years (1882–1883 and 1932–1933) and of the International Geophysical Year (1957–1958) that preceded the Antarctic Treaty, and recalls the heritage of International Cooperation that led to the International Polar Year 2007–2008." This monument was designed and built by the American Joseph W. Pearson, who offered it to Chile. It was unveiled in 1999, on the occasion of the 40th anniversary of the signature of the Antarctic Treaty.	(2007) ATCM XXX - M3	62°12′01″S 58°57′41″W		Upload another image
HSM-83	Base W, Detaille Island, Lallemand Fjord, Loubet Coast	Base "W" is situated on a narrow isthmus at the northern end of Detaille Island, Lallemand Fjord, Loubet Coast. The site consists of a hut and a range of associated structures and outbuildings including a small emergency storage building, bitch and pup pens, anemometer tower and two standard tubular steel radio masts (one to the south west of the main hut and the other to the east). Base "W" was established in 1956 as a British science base primarily for survey, geology and meteorology and to contribute to the IGY in 1957. As a relatively unaltered base from the late 1950s, Base "W" provides an important reminder of the science and living conditions that existed when the Antarctic Treaty was signed 50 years ago.	(2009) ATCM XXXII - M14	66°52′00″S 66°48′00″W		Upload Photo
HSM-84	Hut at Damoy Point, Dorian Bay, Wiencke Island, Palmer Archipelago	The site consists of a well-preserved hut and the scientific equipment and other artefacts inside it. It is located at Damoy Point on Dorian Bay, Wiencke Island, Palmer Archipelago. The hut was erected in 1973 and used for a number of years as a British summer air facility and transit station for scientific personnel. It was last occupied in 1993.	(2009) ATCM XXXII - M14	64°49′00″S 63°31′00″W		Upload another image See more images
HSM-85	Plaque Commemorating the PM-3A Nuclear Power Plant at McMurdo Station	The plaque is approximately 18 x 24 inches, made of bronze and secured to a large vertical rock at McMurdo Station, the former site of the PM-3A nuclear power reactor. It is approximately half way up the west side of Observation Hill. The plaque text details achievements of PM-3A, Antarctica's first nuclear power plant.	(2010) ATCM XXXIII - M15	77°51′00″S 166°41′00″E		Upload another image
HSM-86	No.1 Building at Great Wall Station.	The No.1 Building, built in 1985 with a total floor space of 175 square meters, is located at the centre of the Chinese Antarctic Great Wall Station which is situated in Fildes Peninsula, King George Island, South Shetlands, West Antarctica. The Building marked the commencement of China devoting to Antarctic research in the 1980s, and thus it is of great significance in commemorating China's Antarctic expedition.	(2011) ATCM XXXIV - M12	62°13′04″S 58°57′44″W		Upload Photo
HSM-87	Location of the first permanently occupied German Antarctic research station "Georg Forster" at the Schirmacher Oasis, Dronning Maud Land.	The original site is situated in the Schirmacher Oasis and marked by a commemorative bronze plaque with the label in German language: Antarktisstation Georg Forster 70° 46’ 39’’ S 11° 51’ 03’’ E von 1976 bis 1996. The plaque is well preserved and affixed to a rock wall at the southern edge of the location. This Antarctic research station was opened on 21 April 1976 and closed down in 1993. The entire site has been completely cleaned up after the dismantling of the station was successfully terminated on 12 February 1996. The site is located about 1.5 km east of the current Russian Antarctic research station Novolazarevskaya.	(2013) ATCM XXXVI - M18	70°46′39″S 11°51′03″E		Upload another image
HSM-88	Professor Kudryashov’s Drilling Complex Building	The drilling complex building was constructed in the summer season of 1983–84. Under the leadership of Professor Boris Kudryashov, ancient mainland ice samples were obtained.	(2013) ATCM XXXVI - M18	78°26′00″S 106°48′00″E		Upload Photo
HSM-89	Terra Nova Expedition 1910–12, Upper "Summit Camp" used during survey of Mount Erebus in December 1912.	Camp Site location includes part of a circle of rocks, which were likely used to weight the tent valences. The camp site was used by a science party on Captain Scott’s Terra Nova Expedition, who undertook mapping and collected geological specimens on Mount Erebus in December 1912.	(2013) ATCM XXXVI - M18	77°30′21″S 167°10′14″E		Upload Photo
HSM-90	Terra Nova Expedition 1910–12, Lower "Camp E" Site used during survey of Mount Erebus in December 1912.	Camp Site location consists of a slightly elevated area of gravel and includes some aligned rocks, which may have been used to weight the tent valences. The camp site was used by a science party on Captain Scott’s Terra Nova Expedition, who undertook mapping and collected geological specimens on Mount Erebus in December 1912	(2013) ATCM XXXVI - M18	77°30′21″S 167°09′15″E		Upload Photo
HSM-91	Lame Dog Hut at the Bulgarian base St. Kliment Ohridski, Livingston Island.	The Lame Dog Hut was erected in April 1988, and had been the main building of St. Kliment Ohridski base until 1998. It is presently the oldest preserved building on Livingston Island, used as radio shack and post office, and hosting a museum exhibition of associated artefacts from the early Bulgarian science and logistic operations in Antarctica.	(2015) ATCM XXXVIII - M19	62°38′29″S 60°21′53″W		Upload another image See more images
HSM-92	Oversnow heavy tractor "Kharkovchanka" that was used in Antarctica from 1959 to 2010.	The oversnow heavy tractor "Kharkovchanka" was designed and produced at the Malyshev Transport Machine-Building Plant in Kharkov specially for organizing inland sledge-tractor traverses in Antarctica. This was the first non-serial transport vehicle of the Soviet machine-building produced exclusively for operations in Antarctica. This tractor was not used outside Antarctica. Thus, the STT "Kharkovchanka" is a unique historical example of engineering-technical developments made for exploration of Antarctica.	(2015) ATCM XXXVIII - M19	69°22′41″S 76°22′59″E		Upload another image
HSM-93	Endurance, Wreck of the vessel owned and used by Sir Ernest Shackleton during his 1914-15 Trans-Antarctic Expedition	Wreck of the vessel Endurance, including all artefacts contained within or formerly contained within the ship, which may be lying on the seabed in or near the wreck within a 150m radius. This includes all fixtures and fittings associated with the ship, including ship’s wheel, bell, etc. The designation also includes all items of personal possessions left on the ship by the ship’s company at the time of its sinking. The wreck was located on 5 March 2022.	(2019) ATCM XLII - M12	68°44′21″S 52°19′47″W		Upload another image
HSM-94	Carl Anton Larsen Multiexpedition cairn	The site consists of a rock cairn installed in 1892 by Norwegian Capt. Carl Anton Larsen during the first land-exploration of the area around the current location of Argentina's Marambio Station, where the first Antarctic fossil discoveries were made. The cairn used to have an attached wooden pole (2m high and 5cm diameter) of which nothing remains. Location: northeast of the Argentine Station Marambio, Antarctic Peninsula.	(2019) ATCM XLII - M12	64°14′13″S 56°35′08″W		Upload Photo
HSM-95	Wreck of San Telmo	The wreck includes all parts and accessories related to the vessel, armaments, equipment, supplies, as well as the ship itself and the crew and military staff transported within. The designation also includes all the personal objects that the crew would have left in the ship when it sank. A third-class (74-gun) liner vessel, it had two decks and 74 guns, it was 190 feet in length, with a 52-foot beam and a draught measuring 25 feet. Its approximate displacement was 2,750 tons and it had a crew of 644 men.	M22 (2021)	62°00′00″S 70°00′00″W		Upload Photo
HSM-96	Commemorative plaque commemorating the first visit to the Lake Untersee area	A brass plaque measuring 220 mm × 120 mm, 4 mm thick, with the names of five members of the 14th Soviet Antarctic Expedition who visited the area in 1969, mounted on an aluminium pipe set on a rocky surface.	M18 (2024)	71°20′25″S 13°27′00″W		Upload Photo

== See also ==
- Antarctic Specially Protected Area
- UNESCO World Heritage Site
