= Keuken Rock =

Rock formation in Antarctica

Keuken Rock (68°35′S 77°50′E) is a large insular rock lying off the Vestfold Hills, Antarctica, about 1.4 nautical miles (2.6 km) southwest of Barratt Island. It was mapped by Norwegian cartographers from air photos taken by the Lars Christensen Expedition, 1936–37, and was named by the Antarctic Names Committee of Australia for J. Keuken, a weather observer at Davis Station in 1959.
