= O'Gorman Rocks =

O'Gorman Rocks (68°34′S 77°57′E) are two small insular rocks lying off the Vestfold Hills, about 0.5 nautical miles (0.9 km) south of Trigwell Island. The rocks were plotted from ANARE (Australian National Antarctic Research Expeditions) air photos of 1957 and 1958. Named by Antarctic Names Committee of Australia (ANCA) for M. O'Gorman, weather observer at Davis Station in 1959.
