= Deprez Basin =

Basin in Princess Elizabeth Land, Antarctica

Deprez Basin is a nearly circular basin on the Ingrid Christensen Coast of Princess Elizabeth Land in East Antarctica.

== Location ==
The basin is located at Latitude 68° 30′ 15.8″ S, Longitude 78° 12′ 09.4″ E is a circular body of water connected to Long Fjord, in the Vestfold Hills on the Ingrid Christensen Coast of Princess Elizabeth Land. It is adjacent to Partizan Island near Long Peninsula. There is a connection between the basin and Long Fjord that is only about 40 m wide and not very deep. During the winter, there is a lot more ice on the surface of the basin than on the nearby fjord. This suggests that there is little or no water exchange between the two bodies of water during the winter. The basin has a diameter of about 400 m and a maximum depth of about 13 m. At the surface, the salinity of the water is about 50 g/L, which is above seawater. At a depth of 13 m, the salinity is about 120 g/L. The fact that its water becomes oxygen-free below 6 m shows that it is stratified. According to research, it has been divided into groups since at least 1991. Because of this, it is called meromictic. So, the basin is like other meromictic bodies of water in the Vestfold Hills, like Lake Burton (Antarctica) and Bayly Basin, which are also in the same area. These bodies of water are always stratified, but they still have a seasonal link to fjords and the ocean.

In a study carried out in the period November 1990 to February 1992, Deprez Basin was devoid of rotifers and other invertebrates. However this observation was based on one sample taken during winter. Green alga (Enteromorpha intestinalis) was present on the bottom of the basin in large numbers. The shoreline also had a number of dead fish (Notothenids).

In a separate study of 34 basins in the Vestfold Hills, Deprez Basin was one of 6 classified as seasonally isolated marine basins. This signifies exchange with ocean water during summer but isolation by ice during winter. As a result of ice formation in early autumn, a thermohaline convection cell is formed. The increased salinity, and hence higher density, below the ice layer drives downward mixing in the water column. This phenomenon was also observed in Fletcher Lake.

Chemical analysis of Deprez Basin found m-Cresol, Dimethyl sulfide (DMS), Carbon disulfide in the water column and Benzaldehyde, Octane, Alkyl benzenes, and m-Cresol in the sediments.

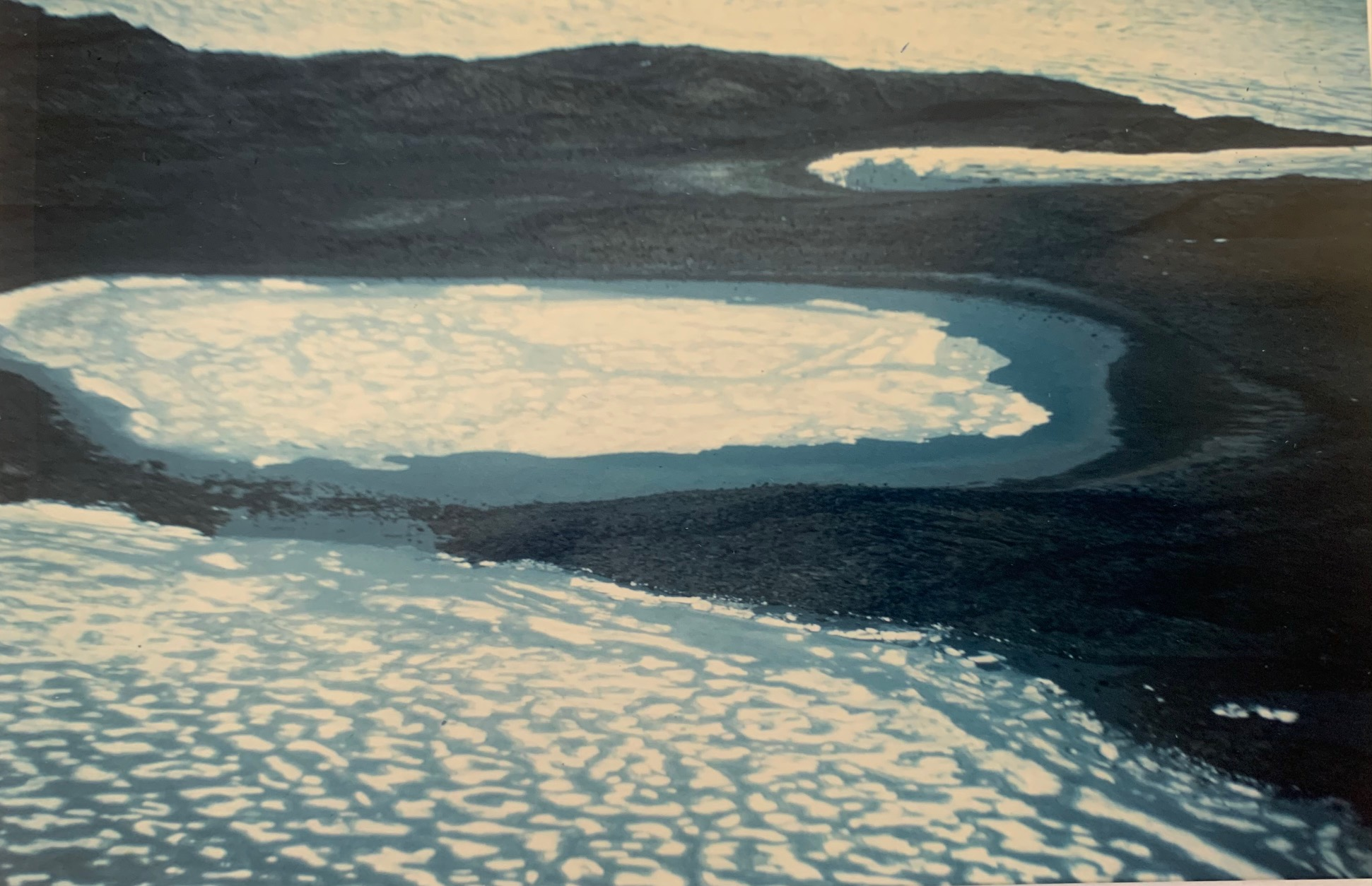
Aerial view of Deprez Basin and its connection to Long Fjord

=== Naming ===
The Antarctic Names Committee of Australia named the basin in 1995 after a chemical limnologist Patrick Deprez, who had been part of the 1984 winter expedition at Davis Station.
