= Tyuleny Island =

Tyuleniy Island, Tyuleny Island or Tyuleniy Islands may refer to:

- Tyuleny Island (Caspian Sea)
- Tyuleniy Archipelago (Kazakhstan)
- Tyuleny Island (Sea of Okhotsk)
- Tyulen'i Islands (Antarctica)
