= Warriner Island =

Island of Antarctica

Coordinates: 68°36′25″S 77°54′50″E

Location in Antarctica

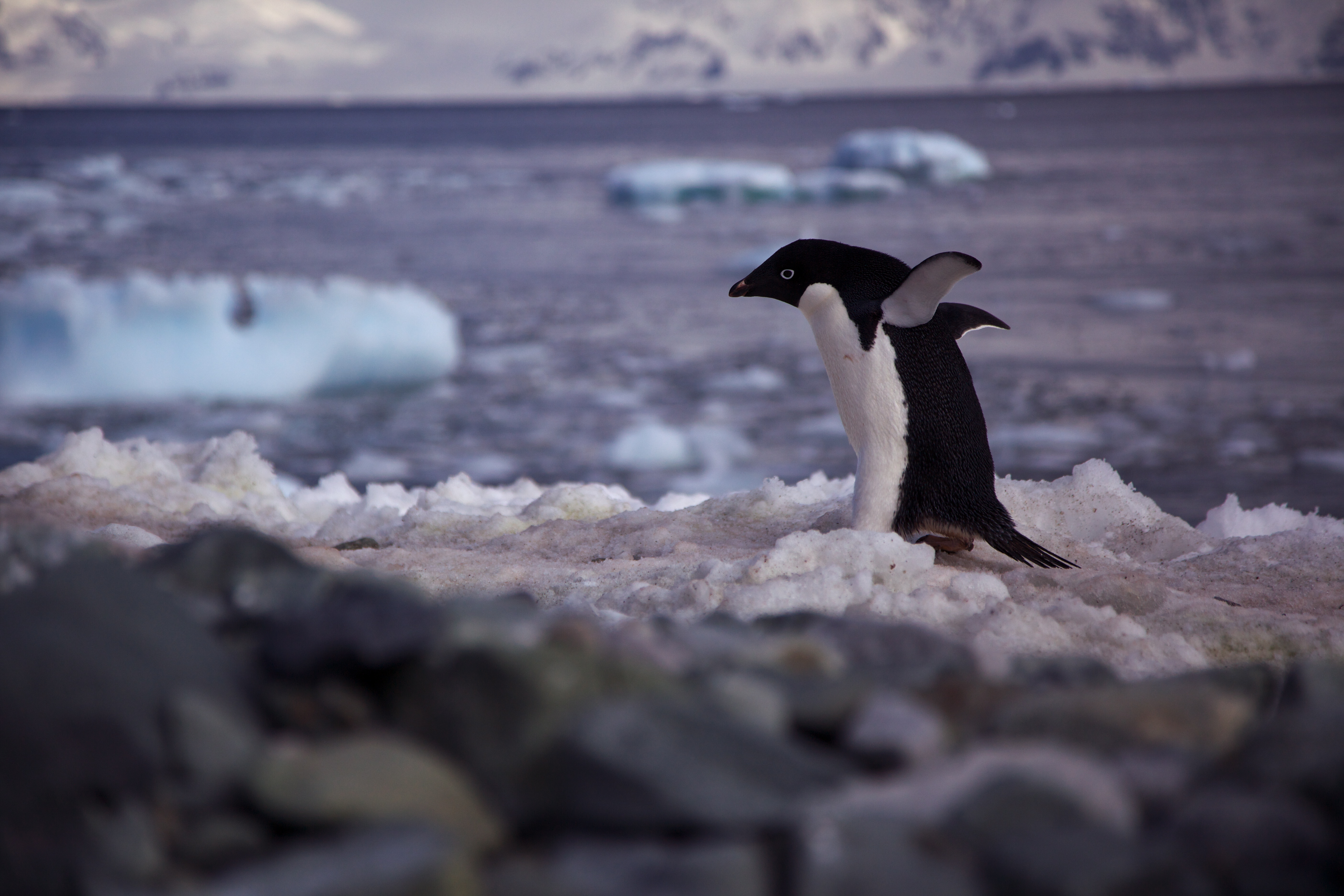
Adélie penguins breed in the IBA

Warriner Island is a small ice-free island in the Donskiye Islands group lying just off the west end of Breidnes Peninsula in the Vestfold Hills, off the coast of East Antarctica. It is 1.2 km long by 0.7 km wide, reaching an elevation of 52 m.

== Discovery and naming ==
It was first mapped by Norwegian cartographers from aerial photos taken by the Lars Christensen Expedition of 1936–1937, and was named by the Antarctic Names Committee of Australia (ANCA) for A. Warriner, the radio officer at Davis Station in 1961.

== Important Bird Area ==
A 68 ha site, comprising the whole island, has been designated an Important Bird Area (IBA) by BirdLife International because it supports a breeding colony of about 24,000 pairs of Adélie penguins, estimated from 2012 satellite imagery. The nearest permanent research station is Australia's Davis, 4 km to the north-east on Breidnes Peninsula.

== See also ==
- List of Antarctic and Subantarctic islands
