= Flutter Island =

Island in Prydz Bay, Antarctica

- Location within Antarctica

Geography
- Location: Antarctica
- Coordinates: 68°33′S 77°58′E

Administration
- Administered under the Antarctic Treaty System

Demographics
- Population: Uninhabited

Flutter Island is an irregular-shaped island, almost cut in two, lying in Prydz Bay between Trigwell Island and Breidnes Peninsula, near the Vestfold Hills of Antarctica. It was first mapped from air photos taken by the Lars Christensen Expedition (1936–37) as two islands. It was remapped as a single island by the Australian National Antarctic Research Expeditions (1957–58) and named for Maxwell J. Flutter, officer in charge at Davis Station in 1958.

== See also ==
- List of antarctic and sub-antarctic islands
