= Lookout Lake (Antarctica) =

Lake in Antarctica

- Location within Antarctica
- Location: Princess Elizabeth Land, East Antarctica
- Coordinates: 68°36′S 77°57′E

The Lookout Lake is a small lake on the Ingrid Christensen Coast of the Princess Elisabeth land in East Antarctica. In the Vestfold Mountains, the lake is 0.8 km north-northeast of the hill The Lookout in the west of the Breidnes Peninsula.

Scientists working at Davis Station visited the lake in 1957 as part of the Australian National Antarctic Research Expeditions and named the lake based on the name of the neighboring hill.
