= Barratt Island =

Island in Antarctica

- Location within Antarctica

Geography
- Location: Antarctica
- Coordinates: 68°33′S 77°52′E

Administration
- Administered under the Antarctic Treaty System

Demographics
- Population: Uninhabited

Barratt Island is a small island lying off the Vestfold Hills, about 2 kilometres (1 nmi) west of Bluff Island. It was mapped by Norwegian cartographers from air photos taken by the Lars Christensen Expedition, 1936–37, and was named by the Antarctic Names Committee of Australia for N.R. Barratt, a weather observer at Davis Station in 1960.

== See also ==
- List of antarctic and sub-antarctic islands
