= Lake Burton (Antarctica) =

Lake in Eastern Antarctica

- Burton Lagoon
- Location of Lake Burton in Antarctica
- Location: Antarctica
- Coordinates: 68°38′S 78°06′E
- Lake type: Meromictic
- Primary inflows: Streams from Vestfold Hills
- Primary outflows: Tidal channel with Crooked Fjord
- Basin countries: Antarctica
- Surface area: 1.35 km^{2} (0.52 mi^{2})
- Average depth: 7.16 m (23.5 ft)
- Max. depth: 18.3 m (60 ft)
- Water volume: 9.69 million cubic metres (7,860 acre⋅ft)
- Frozen: Yes
- Islands: None

Lake Burton, also known as Burton Lagoon, is a meromictic and saline lake in the Vestfold Hills of Princess Elizabeth Land in Eastern Antarctica. Princess Elizabeth Land, including the lake, is claimed by Australia as part of the Australian Antarctic Territory. The lake has a surface area of 1.35 km^{2} (0.52 mi^{2}), a volume of 9.69 million m^{3}, a maximum depth of 18.3 metres (60 ft) and a mean depth of 7.16 metres (23.5 ft). The lake is named after H. R. Burton, a biologist working in the Vestfold Hills of Antarctica.

The lake is covered with ice for 10–11 months in a year. A tidal channel links the lake with Crooked Fjord only seasonally for about 6–7 months in the year. The tidal channel has a width of 20 metres (66 ft) and is about 2 metres (6.6 ft) deep. Lake Burton is the only meromictic lagoon that is part of the Antarctic Specially Protected Area No. 143, within East Antarctica, and access to the lake can only legally be obtained by a special permit and adhering to some strict regulations.

A diatom floristic study of the lagoon revealed that it contains 41 species and is a rich storehouse of psychrophilic photosynthetic bacteria. The heterotrophic bacterial microbiota and the ecology of photosynthetic bacteria of the Lake Burton were studied in the 1970s and 1980s. Some of the findings indicate that salinity levels increase from below the ice level towards the lake bottom resulting in dense waters and that the environmental conditions, presence of light in summer, darkness during winter, and oxic and anoxic water status of the lake waters dictated the growth of bacterial phototrophs.

== Geography and climate ==
Lake Burton is located on the Ingrid Christensen Coast in Princess Elizabeth Land in Eastern Antarctica on roughly the same longitude as central India. This area of the coastline lies between Jennings Promontory, at 72°33'E, and the western end of the West Ice Shelf at 81°24'E in the western half of Princess Elizabeth Land, just east of Amery Ice Shelf. The lake is named after H. R. Burton, a biologist working in the Vestfold Hills of Antarctica. The lake, formerly an arm of the sea, is a dominant feature of the western side of the Vestfold Hills area in what is known as the Mule Peninsula. The lake lies to the northwest of the Sorsdal Glacier, southeast of Oldroyd Island and southwest of the Tryne Islands. The lake has a surface area of 1.35 km^{2} (0.52 mi^{2}), a volume of 9.69 million m^{3}, a maximum depth of 18.3 metres (60 ft) and a mean depth of 7.16 metres (23.5 ft).

The climate within the Antarctic Specially Protected Area is monitored at the Davis Station, which is 10 kilometres (6.2 mi) northwest of Marine Plain, not far from the lake. Hence, all meteorological data collected at this site is relevant to the lake environment also. The area has a polar maritime climate; cold, dry and windy, with sunny days during summer. The temperature varies from −1 °C (30 °F) to 3 °C (37 °F) during summer with a maximum of 5 °C (41 °F); however, the dominant temperature during most of the year is below 0 °C (32 °F). During winter, the temperature falls to as low as −40.7 °C (−41.3 °F).

== Protected area ==
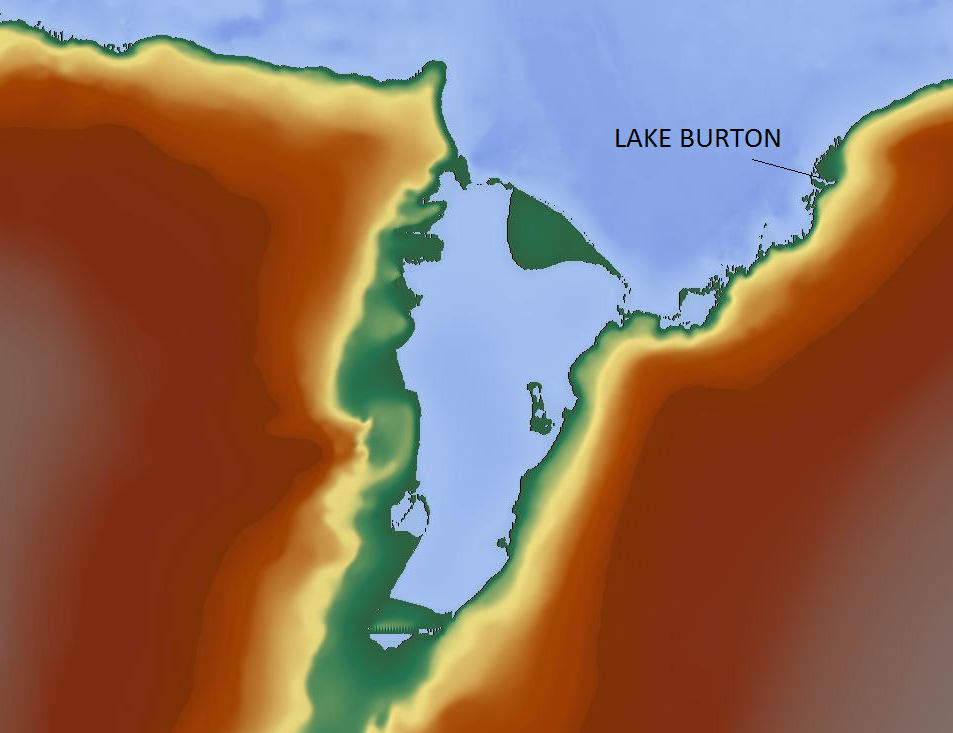
Relief map showing location

Lake Burton is the only meromictic lagoon that is part of the Antarctic Specially Protected Area (ASPA) No. 143, within East Antarctica. The lake is also defined as lagoon as it characterizes a stage in the biological and physio-chemical evolution of a terrestrial water body from the marine environment namely, the geological creation of a lake.

Entry restrictions

Entry to the protected area, including the lake, is controlled by the Australian government. Permits are strictly issued only for specific scientific research in the field of paleontology, paleoclimate, geology, geomorphology, glaciology, biology and limnology. Visits for educational or cultural reasons, which are mandatory within a defined management plan, are also permitted. Any such visit must not cause harm to the ecological or scientific values of the area.

Access and movement within the protected areas is restricted. In the lake area in particular, no motorized boats are permitted. Flying over the lakes is also discouraged except for scientific reasons. Vehicular traffic is banned in the reserved areas. Taking samples from the lake is to be kept to the minimum even for scientific studies and also the equipment brought from outside for sampling, and it must be thoroughly washed to avoid any type of contamination from outside. There are many more rules and regulations that are set by the authorities, which have to be strictly adhered to.

== Fauna and flora ==
The Mule Peninsula, in which the lake is located, is an area rich in fossils. Marine algae are abundant in Lake Burton. A diatom floristic study of the lagoon revealed that it contains 41 species. The lake is a rich storehouse of psychrophilic photosynthetic bacteria – some of which have been found nowhere else. Other dominant varieties of bacteria found are Chlorobium vibrioforme and C. limicola. The minor species identified are Thiocapsa roseopersicina and Rhodopseudomonas palustris.

The lake also has an ultra structure of Postgaardi mariagerens identified as a member of the clade Euglenozoa – Euglenozoa incertae sedis. Choanoflagellates have been found in the lake, including Diaphanoeca grandis, Diaphanoeca sphaerica, Saepicula leadbeateri and Spiraloecion didymocostatum gen. et sp. nov species.

Fish species

The only fish species ever sighted in the lake, and on just one occasion, is Pagothenia borchgrevinki, though it is commonly found in the vicinity in the coastal areas and fjords of the Vestfold Hills.

Zooplankton

Four species of metazoan zooplankton have been recorded in the lake, namely, Drepanopus bispinosus, Paralabidocera antarctica (Copepoda), Rathkea lizzioides (Anthomedusae) and a cydippid ctenophore (not named). Also found in the benthic community here are several species of Holotricha, two species of nematode, and many marine amphipods and tardigrades.

=== Vegetation ===
The small water courses that flow radially from the northern direction into the lake, which are seasonal streams, abound in lichens. Mosses are found but are more prevalent on the northern end of Poseidon Lake. In the region as a whole, 23 species of lichens and six moss species have been recorded.

== Research findings ==
The heterotrophic bacterial microbiota and the ecology of photosynthetic bacteria of the Lake Burton have been studied in the 1970s and 1980s. Some of the findings indicate that salinity levels increase from below the ice level towards the lake bottom resulting in dense waters, the microbiota activity caused depletion of oxygen, separate water bodies of distinct chemistry got formed, the intervening chemical gradients have created niches for colonization by unique microbial communities and 68 bacteria were isolated.

In the research studies on photosynthetic bacteria conducted in 1983, the dominant species identified were Chlorobium vibrioforme and Chlorobium limicola. Thiocapsa roseopersicina and Rhodopseudomonas palustris were also found but at lower density. In the anoxic water zone (temperature range of −5 °C (23 °F) to −2.2 °C (28.0 °F)) of the lake, Chlorobium spp. and T. roseopersicina were found. It was also noted that the environmental conditions, presence of light in summer, darkness during winter, and oxic and anoxic water status of the lake waters dictated the growth of bacterial phototrophs. The dominance of the species Chlorobium spp. was attributed to "more efficient maintenance metabolism in winter and of their greater efficiency in utilizing low intensity light".

In 1984, during the Antarctic summer when phytoplankton bloom was apparent, the lake was studied, along with several others in the Vestfold Hills area to assess the reduced sulfuric gases by gas chromatography. The gases were trapped in a solid adsorbent – a molecular sieve with 5 Å pores (80–100 mesh) – and reduced sulfur compounds (RSCs) were detected. The most apparent RSCs were dimethyl sulfide (DMS), carbonyl sulfide and hydrogen sulfide.
