= Gorev =

Gorev may refer to

- Vladimir Gorev (1900–1938), Belarusian military officer
- Gorev Island in Antarctica
