= Gorev Island =

Island in Queen Mary Land, Antarctica

Gorev Island (66°32′S 92°59′E) is a small island lying between Buromskiy Island and Poryadin Island in the Haswell Islands, Antarctica. It was discovered and mapped by the Australasian Antarctic Expedition under Douglas Mawson, 1911–1914. It was remapped by the Soviet expedition of 1956, and named by them for Demetri Gorev, a member of the British Antarctic Expedition, 1910–13, under Robert Falcon Scott.

== See also ==
- List of antarctic and sub-antarctic islands
