= Plog Island =

Antarctic island in Prydz Bay

- Location within Antarctica

Geography
- Location: Antarctica
- Coordinates: 68°32′S 78°0′E

Administration
- Administered under the Antarctic Treaty System

Demographics
- Population: Uninhabited

Plog Island is an island 1.9 kilometres (1 nmi) long in Prydz Bay, 0.93 kilometres (0.5 nmi) north of Lake Island and 0.93 kilometres (0.5 nmi) west of Breidnes Peninsula, Vestfold Hills. Mapped by Norwegian cartographers from air photos taken by the Lars Christensen Expedition (1936–37) and named "Plogoy" (plow island), as being descriptive of the island's shape.

== See also ==
- List of antarctic and sub-antarctic islands
