= Boyd Island =

Island of Antarctica

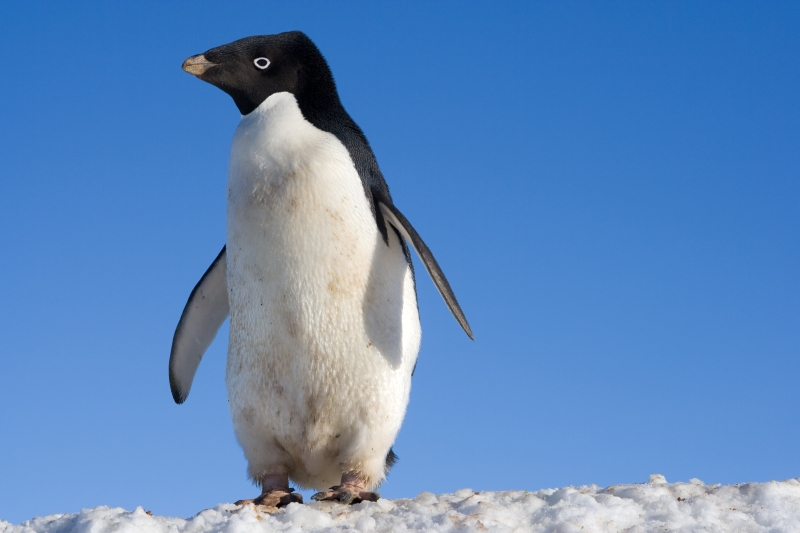
- Adélie penguins breed in the IBA

- Location within Antarctica

Geography
- Location: Princess Elizabeth Land, Antarctica
- Coordinates: 68°32′41″S 77°56′38″E
- Highest elevation: 30.5 m (100.1 ft)

Administration
- Administered under the Antarctic Treaty System

Demographics
- Population: Uninhabited

Boyd Island is an island in Prydz Bay on the Ingrid Christensen Coast of Princess Elizabeth Land, Antarctica. It lies just SSW of Lugg Island, and about 3.5 km NNW of Australia's Davis Station on Broad Peninsula in the Vestfold Hills. It was named after Jeff J. Boyd, a Medical Officer at Davis in 1970.

== Important Bird Area ==
The island forms part of the Magnetic Island and nearby islands Important Bird Area (IBA), comprising Magnetic, Turner, Waterhouse, Lugg, Boyd and Bluff Islands, along with other intervening islands and the marine area. The site was designated an IBA by BirdLife International because it supports large colonies of Adélie penguins totalling some 29,000 breeding pairs, based on 2012 satellite imagery.
