= Wyatt Earp Islands =

Islands in Antarctica

- Location within Antarctica

Geography
- Location: Antarctica
- Coordinates: 68°22′S 78°32′E

Administration
- Administered under the Antarctic Treaty System

Demographics
- Population: Uninhabited

Wyatt Earp Islands are a small group of islands and rocks off the northern extremity of the Vestfold Hills, about 0.9 kilometres (0.5 nmi) north of Walkabout Rocks. Mapped from air photos taken by the Lars Christensen Expedition (1936–37) and named "Norsteholmen" by Norwegian cartographers. In January 1939 a landing was made at nearby Walkabout Rocks from the Wyatt Earp, after which the islands were renamed by Antarctic Names Committee of Australia (ANCA).

== See also ==
- List of antarctic and sub-antarctic islands
