= Stinear Lake =

- Location within Antarctica
- Location: Breidnes Peninsula, Vestfold Hills, Princess Elizabeth Land, Antarctica
- Coordinates: 68°34′S 78°8′E
- Type: salt lakeglacial lake
- Max. length: 2.8 kilometres; 1.7 miles (1.5 nmi)
- Max. width: 0.46 kilometres; 0.29 miles (0.25 nmi)
- Salinity: yes
- Frozen: no

Stinear Lake is an Antarctic salt-water glacial lake.

The lake is 2.8 kilometres; 1.7 miles (1.5 nmi) long and 0.46 kilometres; 0.29 miles (0.25 nmi) wide, lying immediately east of Dingle Lake on Breidnes Peninsula, Vestfold Hills of Princess Elizabeth Land in Antarctica.

It was mapped from air photos taken by U.S. Navy Operation Highjump in 1946–47. It was first visited by an Australian National Antarctic Research Expeditions, led by Philip Law, in 1955. It was named by the Antarctic Names Committee of Australia for Bruce H. Stinear (1913–2003), a New Zealand geologist at Davis and Mawson Station for several seasons in the period 1954–59.
