= Camp Lake (Antarctica) =

- Location within Antarctica
- Location: Antarctica
- Coordinates: 68°33′S 78°5′E
- Type: lake

Camp Lake (68°33′S 78°5′E) is a small lake lying 0.5 nautical miles (0.9 km) west of the head of Weddell Arm on Breidnes Peninsula, Vestfold Hills. Mapped from air photos taken by U.S. Navy Operation Highjump, 1946–47. So named because when first visited by an ANARE (Australian National Antarctic Research Expeditions) party in January 1955, a camp was established near the northeast end of the lake.
