= Burton Lake =

Burton Lake may refer to:

- Lake Burton, Antarctica
- Burton Lake (Georgia)
- Yellow Medicine County, Minnesota
