= Poryadin Island =

Island in Queen Mary Land, Antarctica

Poryadin Island (66°32′S 92°59′E) is an island lying 0.5 nautical miles (0.9 km) south of Haswell Island in the Haswell Islands. Discovered and mapped by the Australasian Antarctic Expedition under Mawson, 1911–1914. Remapped by the Soviet expedition of 1956, and named for Ya. Poryadin, navigator of the ship Vostok with the Bellingshausen expedition 1819–21.

== See also ==
- List of antarctic and sub-antarctic islands
