= Greben' Island =

Island in Queen Mary Land, Antarctica

- Location within Antarctica

Geography
- Location: Antarctica
- Coordinates: 66°31′S 93°1′E

Administration
- Administered under the Antarctic Treaty System

Demographics
- Population: Uninhabited

Greben' Island is a small island lying close north of the east end of Haswell Island in the Haswell Islands of Antarctica. It was photographed and plotted by the Soviet expedition of 1956, and named Greben' (comb) because of its ridgelike shape.

== See also ==
- List of antarctic and sub-antarctic islands
