= Bluff Island =

Bluff Island may refer to the following islands:

- Bluff Island (Andaman and Nicobar Islands)
- Bluff Island (Antarctica), Prydz Bay, Antarctica
- Bluff Island (Hong Kong), Port Shelter, Sai Kung District, Hong Kong
