= Lugg =

Lugg may refer to:

== Geographical names ==
- Lugg Island, Antarctica
- Moreton-on-Lugg, village in Herefordshire, England
- River Lugg, Wales and England

== People ==
- Milton DeLugg (born 1918), American composer and arranger
- Rheanne Lugg (born 1990), Australian rules footballer
- Sheila Tracy (1934–2014), née Lugg, British broadcaster, writer, musician, and singer
- William Lugg (1852–1939), a British actor and singer

== Fiction ==
- Lugg Brothers, two villains in the fantasy animated series The Pirates of Dark Water
- Magersfontein Lugg, character in the Albert Campion novels by Margery Allingham
