= Trigwell =

Trigwell may refer to:

== People with the surname ==
- Hannah Trigwell (born 1990), English singer/songwriter
- Lorna Trigwell (born 1954), South African lawn bowler

== Places ==
- Trigwell, a suburb of McAlinden, Western Australia, with a different postcode, 6244
- Trigwell Island, in Antarctica
