= Fulmar Island =

Island in Queen Mary Land, Antarctica

Fulmar Island (66°32′S 93°1′E) is a small island just south of Zykov Island in the Haswell Islands. It was discovered by the Western Base party of the Australasian Antarctic Expedition (1911–14), who plotted this island and the present Zykov Island as a single island. They named it Fulmar Island because of its rookery of southern fulmars. The Soviet expedition of 1956 found there are two islands, retaining the name Fulmar for the southern one.

== See also ==
- List of antarctic and sub-antarctic islands
