= Walkabout Rocks =

Rock formation in Antarctica

Coordinates: 68°22′S 78°32′E

Walkabout Rocks is a prominent rock exposure along the coast at the north-eastern extremity of the Vestfold Hills, about 0.5 nautical miles (0.9 km; 0.6 mi) south of the Wyatt Earp Islands of Princess Elizabeth Land, Antarctica. It was mapped from aerial photographs taken by the Lars Christensen Expedition, 1936–37.

== Historic site ==
In January 1939 a landing was made on the point, from HMAS Wyatt Earp, and a cairn erected by Hubert Wilkins with a canister containing a record of the event. It was subsequently visited by an ANARE (Australian National Antarctic Research Expeditions) party in May 1957 and the material left in the cairn in 1939 examined. The records were wrapped in a copy of the Australian geographical magazine Walkabout, hence the name given to the site. The cairn has been designated a Historic Site or Monument (HSM 6) following a proposal by Australia to the Antarctic Treaty Consultative Meeting.
