= Stroiteley Islands =

- Island group
- Location within Antarctica
- Coordinates: 66°33′S 92°58′E
- Country: Antarctica

Stroiteley Islands is a chain of about four small islands in the southern part of the Haswell Islands. They are aligned north–south and lie close to the mainland, 1 nautical mile (1.9 km) west of Mabus Point.

== History ==
Plotted by Gardner Dean Blodgett (1955) from aerial photos taken by U.S. Navy Operation Highjump (1946–47). Photographed by the Soviet Antarctic Expedition (1956) and shown on their chart as Ostrova Stroiteley (builders' islands).

== See also ==
- List of antarctic and sub-antarctic islands
