= Waterhouse Island (Antarctica) =

Island of Antarctica

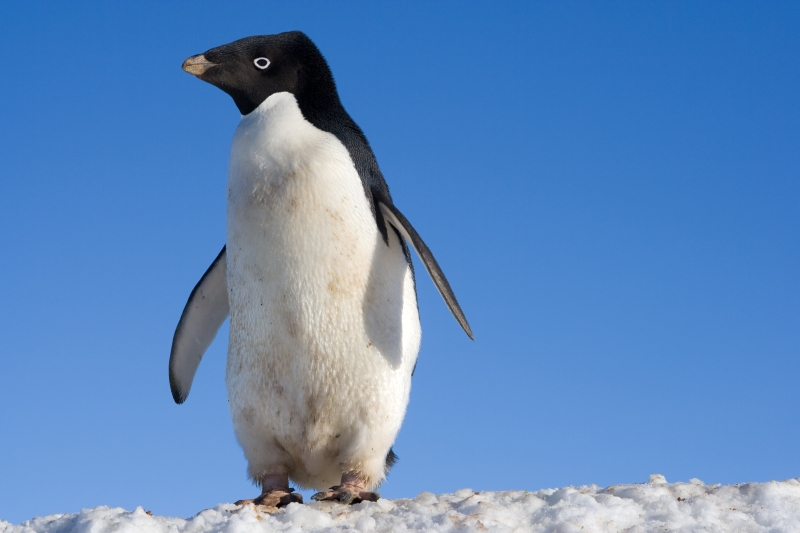
- Adélie penguins breed in the IBA

- Location within Antarctica

Geography
- Location: Princess Elizabeth Land, Antarctica
- Coordinates: 68°32′04″S 77°56′49″E
- Highest elevation: 37.5 m (123 ft)

Administration
- Administered under the Antarctic Treaty System

Demographics
- Population: Uninhabited

Waterhouse Island is an island in Prydz Bay on the Ingrid Christensen Coast of Princess Elizabeth Land, Antarctica. It lies just SSW of Lugg Island, and about 3.5 km NNW of Australia's Davis Station on Broad Peninsula in the Vestfold Hills. It was named after R.S. Waterhouse, a Medical Officer at Davis in 1971.

== Important Bird Area ==
The island forms part of the Magnetic Island and nearby islands Important Bird Area (IBA), comprising Magnetic, Turner, Waterhouse, Lugg, Boyd and Bluff Islands, along with intervening islands and marine area. The site was designated an IBA by BirdLife International because it supports large colonies of Adélie penguins totalling some 29,000 breeding pairs, based on 2012 satellite imagery.
