= Ob' Passage =

Body of water in Queen Mary Land, Antarctica

Ob' Passage (66°33′S 93°1′E) is a passage 0.4 nautical miles (0.7 km) wide between Khmary Island and Mabus Point on the coast of Antarctica. First observed by the Australasian Antarctic Expedition (1911–14) under Douglas Mawson. Mapped by the Soviet expedition (1956), who named it for the ship Ob'.
