= Morennaya Hill =

Hill in Antarctica

Morennaya Hill (66°34′S 93°0′E) is a hill rising to 40 metres (130 ft), standing 1 nautical mile (2 km) southwest of Mabus Point on the coast of Antarctica. It was discovered by the Australasian Antarctic Expedition under Douglas Mawson, 1911–14, and was mapped by the Soviet expedition of 1956, who named it Morennaya (morainic).
