= Komsomol'skaya Hill =

Hill in Antarctica

Komsomol'skaya Hill (66°33′S 93°1′E) is a hill rising to 35 metres (115 ft), standing immediately south of Mabus Point on the coast of Antarctica. It was discovered and roughly sketched by the Australasian Antarctic Expedition under Mawson, 1911–14 and later photographed from the air by U.S. Navy Operation Highjump, 1946–47. The formation was rephotographed by the Soviet expedition of 1956, who named it Gora Komsomol'skaya (Young Communist Hill).
