= Monument to the Antarctic Treaty =

Coordinates: 62°12′01″S 58°57′41″W

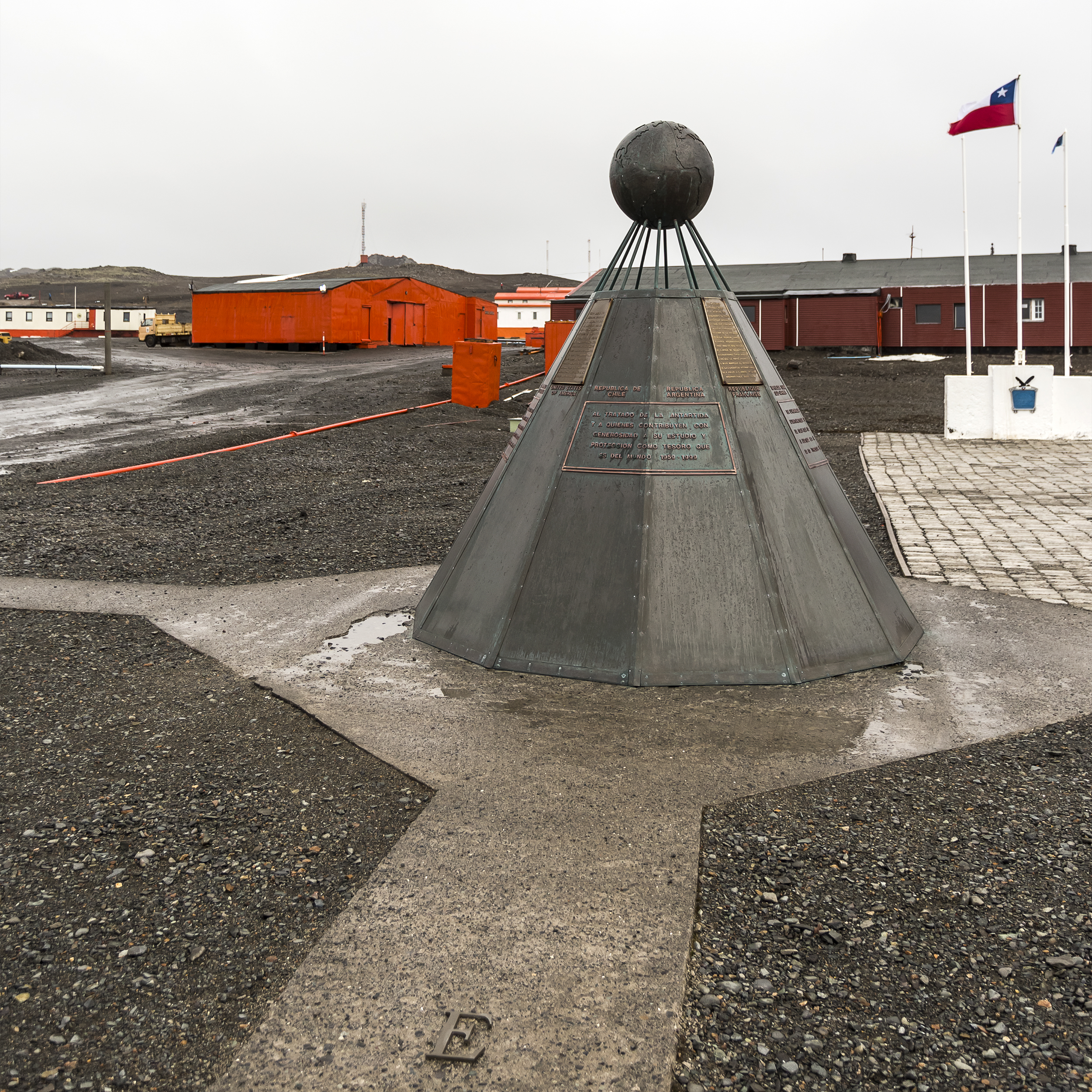
The monument in 2014

The Monument to the Antarctic Treaty commemorates the signatories of the Antarctic Treaty, which was opened for signing in 1959 and came into force in 1961. The monument stands near the Frei, Bellingshausen and Escudero research stations on the Fildes Peninsula of King George Island in the South Shetland Islands of Antarctica. The monument was designed and built by American Joseph W. Pearson and offered to Chile. It was unveiled in 1999, on the 40th anniversary of the signatory opening of the Antarctic Treaty.

The monument carries four subsequently placed plaques in the official languages of the Antarctic Treaty (English, French, Russian and Spanish). These were installed in February 2011 with the English version reading:

“This historic monument, dedicated to the memory of the signatories of the Antarctic Treaty, Washington D.C., 1959, is also a reminder of the legacy of the First and Second International Polar Years (1882–1883 and 1932–1933) and of the International Geophysical Year (1957–1958) that preceded the Antarctic Treaty, and recalls the heritage of International Cooperation that led to the International Polar Year 2007–2008.”

The monument has been designated a Historic Site or Monument (HSM 82), following a proposal by Chile to the Antarctic Treaty Consultative Meeting.
