= Krok Fjord =

Fjord in Antarctica

Krok Fjord (68°40′S 78°0′E) is a narrow sinuous fjord, 11 nautical miles (20 km) long, between Mule Peninsula and Sorsdal Glacier Tongue, at the south end of the Vestfold Hills, Antarctica. It was mapped from air photos taken by the Lars Christensen Expedition (1936–37) and named "Krokfjorden" (the crooked fjord).
