= Radio Hill =

Hill in Antarctica

Radio Hill (66°33′S 93°0′E) is a hill rising to 50 m, standing 0.4 nautical miles (0.7 km) southwest of Mabus Point on the coast of Antarctica. It was discovered and first mapped by the Australasian Antarctic Expedition led by Douglas Mawson, 1911–1914. It was remapped and named by the Soviet expedition of 1956.
