= Tokarev Island =

Island in the Haswell Islands

Coordinates: 66°32′S 92°59′E

Tokarev Island is one of the small islands in the Haswell Islands, lying 0.1 nautical miles (0.2 km) west of Gorev Island. Discovered and first mapped by the Australasian Antarctic Expedition (1911–14) under Douglas Mawson. Photographed by the Soviet Antarctic Expedition (1956) and named for Aleksey K. Tokarev (1915–57), biologist on the expedition who died while returning from the Antarctic.

== See also ==
- List of antarctic and sub-antarctic islands
