= Buromskiy Island =

Island in Queen Mary Land, Antarctica

Coordinates: 66°32′S 93°0′E

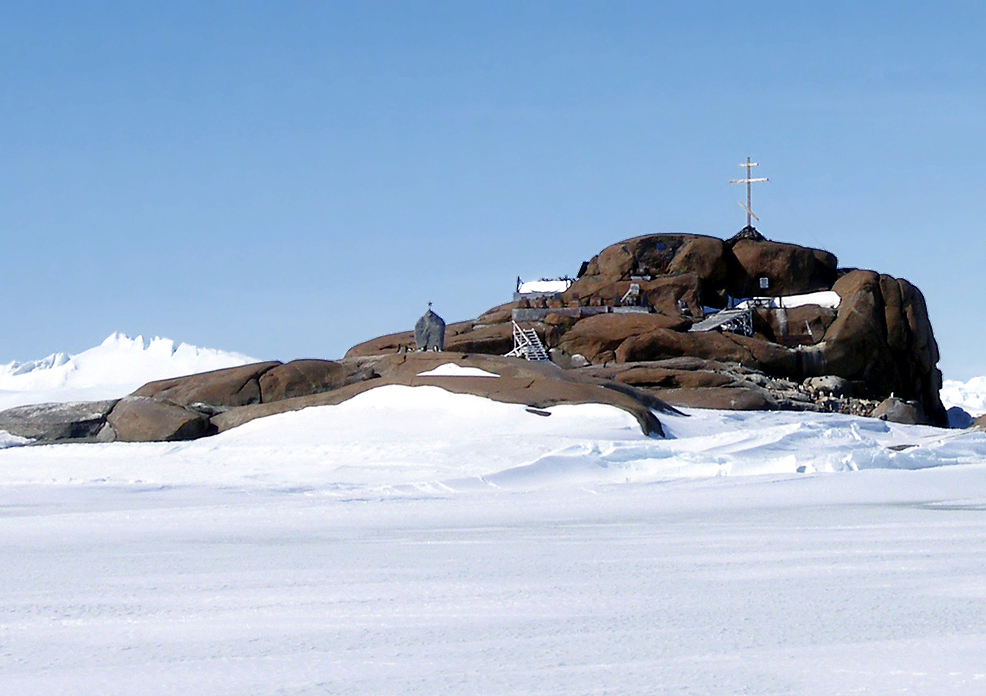
View of the cemetery and Ivan Khmara's Stone on the island

Buromskiy Island is a small island lying 0.6 km (0.37 mi) south of Haswell Island in the Haswell Islands of Antarctica. About 200 m long and 100 m wide, it was discovered and mapped by the Australasian Antarctic Expedition under Douglas Mawson, 1911–14. It was photographed by the Soviet expedition of 1958 and named for N.I. Buromskiy, expedition hydrographer who lost his life in the Antarctic in 1957. It lies 2.7 km north of Mabus Point, the site of Russia's Mirny Station.

== Historic sites and monuments ==
=== Buromskiy Island Cemetery ===
The island holds a cemetery for several citizens of the Soviet Union, Czechoslovakia, the German Democratic Republic and Switzerland who died in the performance of their duties while serving as members of Soviet and Russian Antarctic expeditions. It has been designated a Historic Site or Monument (HSM 9) following a proposal by Russia to the Antarctic Treaty Consultative Meeting.

=== Ivan Khmara's Stone ===
A stone with an inscribed plaque commemorates Ivan Khmara, a driver-mechanic with the first Soviet Antarctic Expedition, who died while performing his duties on fast ice on 21 January 1956. The stone was originally erected at nearby Mabus Point, but was moved to Buromskiy Island in 1974 because of construction activity at Mirny. Ivan Khmara's Stone has been designated a Historic Site or Monument (HSM 7) following a proposal by Russia to the Antarctic Treaty Consultative Meeting.

== See also ==
- List of Antarctic and subantarctic islands
