= Trigwell Island =

Island in Antarctica

Trigwell Island (68°33′S 77°57′E) is an island in Prydz Bay, lying immediately west of Flutter Island and 1 nautical mile (1.9 km) west of Breidnes Peninsula, Vestfold Hills. First mapped from air photos taken by the Lars Christensen Expedition, 1936–37. Remapped by ANARE (Australian National Antarctic Research Expeditions) (1957–58) and named for E.S. Trigwell, radio supervisor at Davis Station in 1958.

== See also ==
- List of antarctic and sub-antarctic islands
