= Mount Dockery =

Mountain in Ross Dependency, Antarctica

Coordinates: 71°13′S 164°33′E

Mount Dockery is a mountain, 1,095 m (3,590 ft) high, standing 6 km (4 mi) west of Mount Matthias in the western part of the Everett Range in the Concord Mountains of northern Victoria Land, Antarctica. It stands on the Pennell Coast, between Cape Williams and Cape Adare.

== History ==
The mountain was mapped by the United States Geological Survey from surveys and US Navy aerial photographs, 1960–1962, and was named by the Advisory Committee on Antarctic Names for Lieutenant Olan L. Dockery, a U.S. Navy Squadron VX-6 pilot who flew photographic flights in northern Victoria Land, the Queen Maud Mountains, the Britannia Range and the McMurdo Sound area in the 1962–63 and 1963–64 seasons.

=== Historic monument ===
Lillie Marleen Hut was erected at the mountain to support the work of the first German Antarctic Northern Victoria Land Expedition (GANOVEX I) of 1979–1980. The hut, a bivouac shelter made of prefabricated fibreglass units insulated with polyurethane foam, was named after the Lillie Glacier and the song "Lillie Marleen". The hut is also associated with the sinking of the ship "Gotland II" during a subsequent expedition, GANOVEX II, in December 1981. The hut has been designated a Historic Site or Monument (HSM 79), following a proposal by Germany to the Antarctic Treaty Consultative Meeting.
