= Bluff Island (Antarctica) =

Island of Antarctica

- Location within Antarctica

Geography
- Location: Antarctica
- Coordinates: 68°33′S 77°54′E

Administration
- Administered under the Antarctic Treaty System

Demographics
- Population: Uninhabited

Bluff Island is an island lying 1 kilometre (0.5 nmi) south of Magnetic Island and 4 kilometres (2 nmi) west of the Breidnes Peninsula, Vestfold Hills, in Prydz Bay, Antarctica. It was mapped from aerial photos taken by the Lars Christensen Expedition, 1936–37, re-emapped by the Australian National Antarctic Research Expeditions (1957–58) and so named because the south end of the island is marked by a steep cliff face.

== Important Bird Area ==
The island forms part of the Magnetic Island and nearby islands Important Bird Area (IBA), comprising Magnetic, Turner, Waterhouse, Lugg, Boyd and Bluff Islands, along with the intervening islands and marine area. The site was designated an IBA by BirdLife International because it supports large colonies of Adélie penguins totalling some 29,000 breeding pairs, based on 2012 satellite imagery.

== See also ==
- List of Antarctic and Subantarctic islands
