= Donskiye Islands =

Islands of Antarctica

Coordinates: 68°36′29″S 77°53′37″E

Location in Antarctica

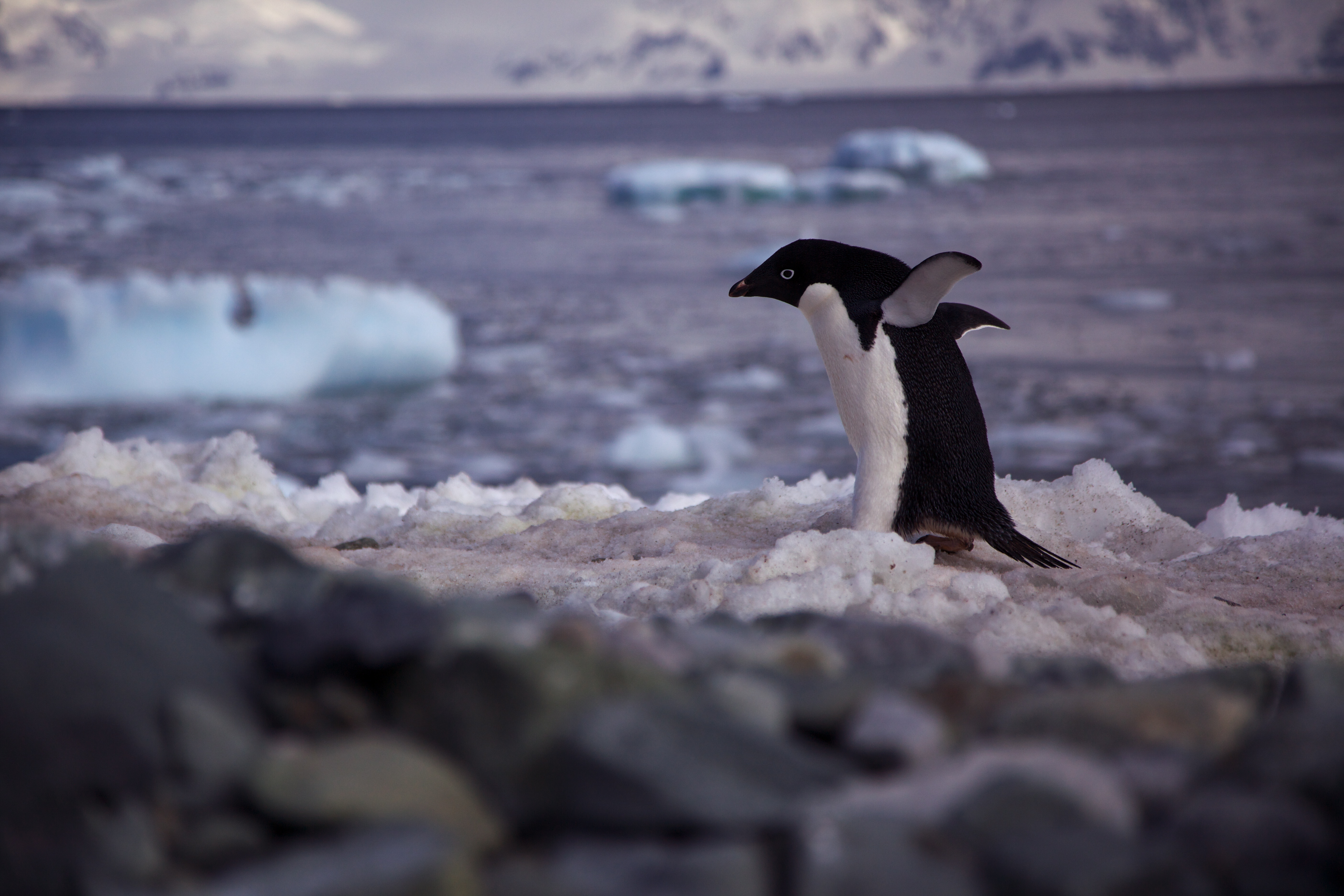
Adélie penguins breed in the IBA

The Donskiye Islands form a small archipelago, including Warriner Island and Redfearn Island, off Breidnes Peninsula in the Vestfold Hills of Princess Elizabeth Land, Antarctica.

== Discovery and naming ==
The islands were mapped from aerial photographs taken by the Lars Christensen Expedition (1936–37) and called Mulvikholmane (Mule Bay Islets) by Norwegian cartographers. They were photographed by the USN’s Operation Highjump in 1946–47, the Soviet Antarctic Expedition in 1956, and ANARE in 1957 and 1958. They were named Ostrova Donskiye (Don Islands) by the Soviet Expedition.

== Important Bird Area ==
A 20 ha site, comprising a small unnamed island situated 500 m west of Redfearn Island in the Donskiye group, has been designated an Important Bird Area (IBA) by BirdLife International because it supports a breeding colony of about 21,000 pairs of Adélie penguins, estimated from 2012 satellite imagery. The nearest permanent research station is Australia's Davis, 6 km to the north-east on Breidnes Peninsula.
