= Sørsdal Glacier =

Glacier in Princess Elizabeth Land, Antarctica

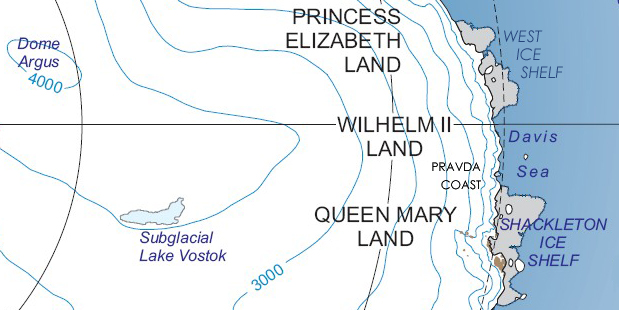
- Location of Princess Elizabeth Land

- Location within Antarctica
- Type: heavily crevassed
- Location: Princess Elizabeth Land
- Coordinates: 68°41′S 78°15′E
- Length: 15 nmi (28 km; 17 mi)
- Thickness: unknown
- Terminus: Prydz Bay
- Status: unknown

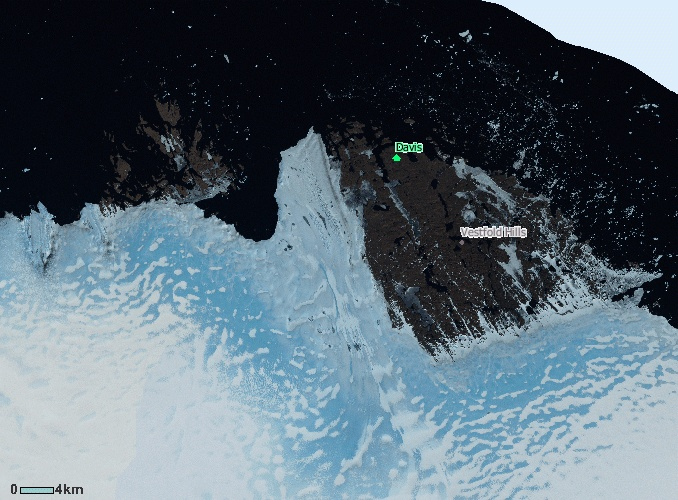
Landsat image of the Sorsdal Glacier region.

Sørsdal Glacier (68°41′S 78°15′E) is a heavily crevassed glacier on the Ingrid Christensen Coast of Princess Elizabeth Land in Antarctica, 15 nautical miles (28 km) long, flowing westward along the south side of Krok Fjord and the Vestfold Hills and terminating in a prominent glacier tongue at Prydz Bay. Discovered in February 1935 by a Norwegian expedition under Captain Klarius Mikkelsen and named for Lief Sørsdal, a Norwegian dentist and a member of the party from the whaling ship Thorshavn that landed at the northern end of the Vestfold Hills.

The Sørsdal Glacier Tongue (68°42′S 78°0′E) is the prominent seaward extension of Sørsdal Glacier into Prydz Bay.

== See also ==
- List of glaciers in the Antarctic
- Glaciology
