= Haswell Island =

Island of Antarctica

- Location within Antarctica

Geography
- Location: Antarctica
- Coordinates: 66°31′S 93°0′E

Administration
- Administered under the Antarctic Treaty System

Demographics
- Population: Uninhabited

Haswell Island is the largest of the Haswell Islands, lying off the coast of Antarctica, about 3 kilometres (1.5 nmi) north of Mabus Point in Queen Mary Land. It was discovered by the Western Base Party of the Australasian Antarctic Expedition, 1911–14, under Mawson, and named by him for Professor William A. Haswell, a zoologist at Sydney University and a member of the expedition's Advisory Committee.

== Birds ==
The island is a unique site for almost all bird species breeding in East Antarctica, including Antarctic petrels, Antarctic fulmars, Cape petrels, snow petrels, Wilson's storm petrels, south polar skuas and Adélie penguins. To the south-east of the island, there is a large colony of emperor penguins breeding on fast ice. The island and the adjacent emperor penguin rookery site are protected under the Antarctic Treaty System as Antarctic Specially Protected Area (ASPA) No.127. The same 500 ha site, comprising the whole island as well as the adjoining sea ice where the emperor penguins breed, has been designated an Important Bird Area (IBA) by BirdLife International. The area also supports five species of seals, including Ross seals.

== See also ==
- List of Antarctic and Subantarctic islands
