= Mabus Point =

Cape on the Antarctic coast

Coordinates: 66°33′S 93°1′E

Location of Mabus Point in Antarctica

Mabus Point is a point on the coast of Antarctica lying just south of the Haswell Islands, marking the eastern limit of McDonald Bay. It stands 1 nautical mile(2 km) Northwest of Morennaya Hill. It was first charted by the Australasian Antarctic Expedition, 1911–14, under Douglas Mawson, and was recharted by Gardner Dean Blodgett in 1955 from aerial photographs taken by U.S. Navy Operation Highjump, 1946–47. The point was named by the Advisory Committee on Antarctic Names for Lieutenant Commander Howard W. Mabus, U.S. Navy, executive officer of the icebreaker Edisto, who was instrumental in providing close support to U.S. Navy Operation Windmill parties in establishing astronomical control stations along this coast, 1947–48. Mabus Point subsequently became the site of the Soviet scientific station, Mirny.

Ob' Passage is a passage 0.4 nautical miles (0.7 km) wide between Mabus Point and nearby Khmary Island.

== See also ==
- Komsomol'skaya Hill
- Morennaya Hill
- Radio Hill
