= Haswell Islands =

Island group off the coast of Antarctica

- Location within Antarctica

Geography
- Location: Antarctica
- Coordinates: 66°32′S 93°0′E

Administration
- Administered under the Antarctic Treaty System

Demographics
- Population: Uninhabited

The Haswell Islands are a group of rocky coastal islands lying off Mabus Point, Antarctica, and extending about 3 kilometres (1.5 nmi) seaward. They were charted by the Australasian Antarctic Expedition under Douglas Mawson (1911–14), who applied the name "Rookery Islands" because of a large emperor penguin rookery on Haswell Island, the largest and seaward island in the group. In 1955 the Antarctic Names Committee of Australia proposed that the name Haswell be extended to the entire group.

== List of islands ==
- Buromskiy Island
- Tokarev Island
- Vkhodnoy Island

== See also ==
- Composite Antarctic Gazetteer
- Holme Bay
- List of Antarctic islands south of 60° S
- Scientific Committee on Antarctic Research
- Territorial claims in Antarctica
