= Breidnes Peninsula =

Peninsula in Antarctica

Breidnes Peninsula (68°34′S 78°10′E) is a rocky peninsula, 13 nautical miles (24 km) long and 5 nautical miles (9 km) wide, between Ellis Fjord and Langnes Fjord in the Vestfold Hills. It was mapped by Norwegian cartographers from air photos taken by the Lars Christensen Expedition (1936–37) and named "Breidneset" (the "broad promontory").
