= Vestfold Hills =

Mountain range in Antarctica

Coordinates: 68°33′S 78°15′E

The Vestfold Hills are rounded, rocky, coastal hills, 512 square kilometres (198 sq mi) in extent, on the north side of Sorsdal Glacier on the Ingrid Christensen Coast of Princess Elizabeth Land, Antarctica. The hills are subdivided by three west-trending peninsulas bounded by narrow fjords. Most of the hills range between 30 and 90 metres (98 and 300 ft) in height, with the highest summit reaching nearly 160 metres (520 ft).

== Geography ==
The Vestfold Hills are largely snow- and ice-free and are thus classified as an Antarctic oasis. They contain a great variety of lake systems with over 300 lakes and ponds including what is possibly the largest concentration of meromictic (stratified) lakes in the world. This region contains 37 permanently stratified water bodies, including six marine basins and seven seasonally isolated marine basins (SIMBs). These stratified basins also have great variety. They range in salinity from 4 g L^{−1} to 235 g L^{−1}, in temperature from −14 to 24 °C (6.8 to 75 °F), in depth from 5 to 110 metres (16 to 361 ft), in area from 3.6 to 146 hectares (8.9 to 360.8 acres) and surface level from 30 metres (98 ft) below to 29 metres (95 ft) above sea level. The region contains a large lake, Lake Burton, as well as the smaller Krok Lake and Camp Lake.

== History and naming ==
The Vestfold Hills were discovered, and a landing was made in the northern portion, on February 20, 1935, by Captain Klarius Mikkelsen together with his wife and seven crew members (including the ship's dentist, Lief Sørsdal) of the Norwegian whaling ship "Thorshavn" sent out by Lars Christensen. Caroline Mikkelsen, thereby became the first woman to set foot on the Antarctic continent.

The Vestfold Hills are named after Vestfold, a county in Norway where Sandefjord, headquarters of the whaling industry, was located. This hill area and its off-lying islands were mapped from air photos taken by the Lars Christensen Expedition (1936–37). Further brief landings were made by Lincoln Ellsworth and several claims were made by Hubert Wilkins in 1939. The area was photographed from the air by USN Operation Highjump (1946–47). Landings were made and exploration carried out in 1954 and 1955 by ANARE (Australian National Antarctic Research Expeditions) led by Phillip Law. Davis Station was established by ANARE in January 1957.

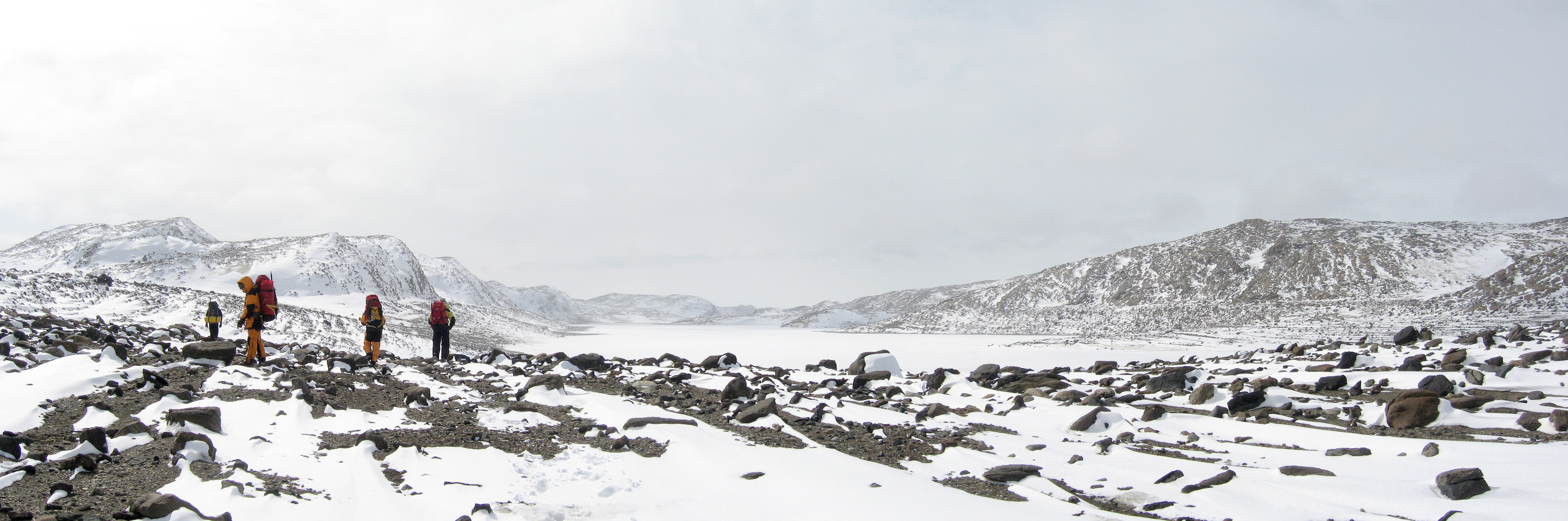
A panoramic view of the northern end of Stinear Lake, in the snow-covered Vestfold Hills, Antarctica.
