= Buttress (disambiguation) =

A buttress is an architectural structure built against or projecting from a wall which serves to support or reinforce the wall.

Buttress may also refer to:

== Architectural design ==
- Buttressed core, structural system for high buildings
- Flying buttress, form of buttress with a ramping arch
- Buttress dam, a dam that uses buttresses as a form of support

== Natural landforms ==
- Angino Buttress, buttress type mountain
- Buchia Buttress, rock buttress
- Cockscomb Buttress, isolated rock buttress
- Duseberg Buttress, rock buttress
- Fang Buttress, rock buttress
- Ferrell Buttress, rock buttress
- Frog Buttress, cliff on the north-west side of Mount French
- Hayduta Buttress, rounded ice-covered buttress
- Henriksen Buttress, rock buttress
- Ilchev Buttress, ice-covered buttress
- Jenny Buttress, rock buttress
- Kardam Buttress, sloping ice-covered buttress
- Kenderova Buttress, ice-covered ridge
- Mezzo Buttress, rocky buttress
- Mitino Buttress, rounded ice-covered buttress
- Sauria Buttress, rock buttress
- Palindrome Buttress, rock buttress
- Paroriya Buttress, ice-covered ridge
- Robertson Buttress, rock buttress
- Shapkarev Buttress, rounded ice-covered buttress
- Stamp Buttress, rock buttress
- Sumgin Buttress, elevated rock
- Sørlle Buttress, mountain between Mount Spaaman and Three Brothers
- Taylor Buttresses, oval shaped, whale-back shaped hill on three buttresses
- Travnik Buttress, ice-covered ridge
- Vittoria Buttress, rock cliff

== Surname ==
- Donald Buttress, English architect
- Mike Buttress (born 1958), English former footballer
- Jim Buttress (born 1945), British horticulturalist and gardener
- William Buttress (1827-1866), English cricketer
- Wolfgang Buttress (born 1965), English artist

== Other uses ==
- Buttress root, large roots on all sides of a tree
- Buttress thread, screw thread profile with an asymmetric square/slanted shape
- USS Buttress, auxiliary minelayer
- Buttress, Saskatchewan, defunct aerodrome in Saskatchewan, Canada
