= Biscoe =

Biscoe may refer to:

== People ==
- Biscoe (surname)

== School ==
- Tyndale Biscoe School, CMS Tyndale Biscoe Memorial High School in Srinagar India

== Places ==
Antarctica

- Biscoe Bay
- Biscoe Point
- Biscoe Islands
- Mount Biscoe
- Biscoe Sea, an historical map entry for the area of Lazarev Sea

USA

- Biscoe, North Carolina
- Fredonia (Biscoe), Arkansas
- Biscoe, Virginia

== Ships ==
- The RRS John Biscoe, a former British Antarctic Survey supply and research ship.
  - RRS John Biscoe (1944)
  - RRS John Biscoe (1956)

== See also ==
- Bisco (disambiguation)
- Bisko
