= 1976–77 Aston Villa F.C. season =

English football club season

Aston Villa
1976–77 season
- Chairman: Sir William Dugdale, Bt
- Manager: Ron Saunders
- Stadium: Villa Park
- First Division: 4th
- FA Cup: Sixth round
- League Cup: Winners
- Top goalscorer: League: Andy Gray (25); All: Andy Gray (29)
- Average home league attendance: 37,904

Second City Derby
- 33--26--24

The 1976–77 English football season was Aston Villa's 78th season in the Football League and their second consecutive season in the top division.

Andy Gray and was joint winner of England's golden boot with Arsenal's Malcolm Macdonald in 1976–77. Gray's 29 goals helped Villa to a fourth-place finish and victory in the League Cup, and earned him the PFA Young Player of the Year and PFA Players' Player of the Year awards.

There were debut appearances for Gordon Smith (79), Alex Cropley (67), Ivor Linton (27), Charlie Young (11), Mick Buttress (3), and David T. Hughes (4). Villa lost both games in the Second City derby.

== League ==
Pos	Team	Pld	W	D	L	GF	GA	GD	Pts	Qualification or relegation
2	Manchester City	42	21	14	7	60	34	+26	56	Qualification for the UEFA Cup first round
3	Ipswich Town	42	22	8	12	66	39	+27	52	Qualification for the UEFA Cup first round
4	Aston Villa	42	22	7	13	76	50	+26	51	Qualification for the UEFA Cup first round
5	Newcastle United	42	18	13	11	64	49	+15	49	Qualification for the UEFA Cup first round
6	Manchester United	42	18	11	13	71	62	+9	47	Qualification for the European Cup Winners' Cup first round (Note: Manchester United qualified for the European Cup Winners' Cup first round as the 1976–77 FA Cup winners.)

Source: World Football
Rules for classification: 1) Points; 2) Goal difference; 3) Goals scored

=== Matches ===
Aston Villa's score comes first

Win	Draw	Loss

21 August 1976	Aston Villa	4–0	West Ham United	Villa Park
	Andy Gray (2), Ray Graydon (2)	Report

25 August 1976	Manchester City	2–0	Aston Villa	Maine Road
		Report

28 August 1976	Everton	0–2	Aston Villa	Goodison Park
		Report	Brian Little, Mick Lyons (own goal)
Note: 31 Aug 1976: No fewer than nine teams are level on four points at the top of the First Division after three matches. Aston Villa lead on goal difference. Norwich City are the only team yet to register a point.

4 September 1976	Aston Villa	5–2	Ipswich Town	Villa Park
	Andy Gray (3), Ray Graydon, Brian Little	Report

11 September 1976	Queens Park Rangers	2–1	Aston Villa	Loftus Road
		Report	Andy Gray

18 September 1976	Aston Villa	1–2	Birmingham City	Villa Park
	Andy Gray	Report

25 September 1976	Aston Villa	2–0	Leicester City	Villa Park
	Andy Gray, Ray Graydon	Report

2 October 1976	Stoke City	1–0	Aston Villa	Victoria Ground
		Report

16 October 1976	Sunderland	0–1	Aston Villa	Roker Park
		Report	Alex Cropley

20 October 1976	Aston Villa	5–1	Arsenal	Villa Park
	Andy Gray (2), Ray Graydon, Brian Little, Dennis Mortimer	Report

23 October 1976	Aston Villa	3–1	Bristol City	Villa Park
	John Gidman, Ray Graydon, Chris Nicholl	Report

30 October 1976	Liverpool	3–0	Aston Villa	Anfield
		Report

6 November 1976	Aston Villa	3–2	Manchester United	Villa Park
	Andy Gray (2), Dennis Mortimer	Report

10 November 1976	West Bromwich Albion	1–1	Aston Villa	The Hawthorns
		Report	Dennis Mortimer

20 November 1976	Aston Villa	2–2	Coventry City	Villa Park
	John Gidman, Andy Gray	Report

27 November 1976	Norwich City	1–1	Aston Villa	Carrow Road
		Report	Brian Little

11 December 1976	Leeds United	1–3	Aston Villa	Elland Road
		Report	Alex Cropley, Andy Gray (2)

15 December 1976	Aston Villa	5–1	Liverpool	Villa Park
	John Deehan (2), Andy Gray (2), Brian Little	Report
Note:

18 December 1976	Aston Villa	2–1	Newcastle United	Villa Park
	John Deehan (2)	Report

27 December 1976	Middlesbrough	3–2	Aston Villa	Ayresome Park
		Report	Andy Gray, David Hughes

1 January 1977	Manchester United	2–0	Aston Villa	Old Trafford
		Report

22 January 1977	West Ham United	0–1	Aston Villa	Boleyn Ground
		Report	Andy Gray

5 February 1977	Aston Villa	2–0	Everton	Villa Park
	Andy Gray, Brian Little

12 February 1977	Ipswich Town	1–0	Aston Villa	Portman Road

2 March 1977	Aston Villa	4–0	Derby County	Villa Park
	Gordon Cowans, John Gidman, Brian Little, Dennis Mortimer

5 March 1977	Leicester City	1–1	Aston Villa	Filbert Street
			John Deehan

23 March 1977	Aston Villa	4–1	Sunderland	Villa Park
	John Deehan (2), John Gidman, Andy Gray

2 April 1977	Bristol City	0–0	Aston Villa	Ashton Gate Stadium

5 April 1977	Aston Villa	1–0	Middlesbrough	Villa Park
	John Deehan

9 April 1977	Derby County	2–1	Aston Villa	Baseball Ground
			Brian Little

16 April 1977	Coventry City	2–3	Aston Villa	Highfield Road
			Gordon Cowans, John Deehan, Brian Little

20 April 1977	Aston Villa	2–1	Tottenham Hotspur	Villa Park
	John Deehan, Brian Little

23 April 1977	Aston Villa	1–0	Norwich City	Villa Park
	Brian Little

25 April 1977	Arsenal	3–0	Aston Villa	Arsenal Stadium

30 April 1977	Tottenham Hotspur	3–1	Aston Villa	White Hart Lane
			John Deehan

4 May 1977	Aston Villa	1–1	Manchester City	Villa Park
	Brian Little

7 May 1977	Aston Villa	2–1	Leeds United	Villa Park
	Alex Cropley, John Deehan

10 May 1977	Birmingham City	2–1	Aston Villa	St Andrew's
			John Deehan

14 May 1977	Newcastle United	3–2	Aston Villa	St James' Park
			Brian Little (2)

16 May 1977	Aston Villa	1–0	Stoke City	Villa Park
	Andy Gray
Note: The 17-year-old apprentice, Ivor Linton makes his debut as a substitute. Villa's victory relegates the Potteries club.

20 May 1977	Aston Villa	1–1	Queens Park Rangers	Villa Park
	Gordon Cowans

23 May 1977	Aston Villa	4–0	West Bromwich Albion	Villa Park
	Andy Gray (3), Chris Nicholl
Note:

Source: avfchistory.co.uk

== League Cup ==
=== Second round ===
Number of teams per tier entering this round
First Division	Second Division	Third Division	Fourth Division	Total
22 / 22	18 / 22	12 / 24	12 / 24	64 / 92

Home team	Score	Away team	Date
Aston Villa (1)	3–0	Manchester City (1)	1 September 1976

=== Third round ===
Number of teams per tier entering this round
First Division	Second Division	Third Division	Fourth Division	Total
14 / 22	9 / 22	4 / 24	5 / 24	32 / 92

Home team	Score	Away team	Date
Aston Villa (1)	2–1	Norwich City (1)	21 September 1976

=== Fourth round ===
Number of teams per tier entering this round
First Division	Second Division	Third Division	Fourth Division	Total
9 / 22	3 / 22	3 / 24	1 / 24	16 / 92

Home team	Score	Away team	Date
Aston Villa (1)	5–1	Wrexham (3)	27 October 1976

=== Fifth Round ===
Number of teams per tier entering this round
First Division	Second Division	Third Division	Fourth Division	Total
6 / 22	2 / 22	0 / 24	0 / 24	8 / 92

Home team	Score	Away team	Date
Aston Villa (1)	2–0	Millwall (2)	1 December 1976

=== Semi-finals ===
Number of teams per tier entering this round
First Division	Second Division	Third Division	Fourth Division	Total
3 / 22	1 / 22	0 / 24	0 / 24	4 / 92

First leg

Home team	Score	Away team	Date
Queens Park Rangers (1)	0–0	Aston Villa (1)	1 February 1977

Second leg

Home team	Score	Away team	Date	Agg
Aston Villa (1)	2–2	Queens Park Rangers (1)	16 February 1977	2–2

Replay

Home team	Score	Away team	Date	Venue
Queens Park Rangers (1)	0–3	Aston Villa (1)	22 February 1977	Highbury

=== Final ===
12 Mar 1977: The League Cup final ends in a 0–0 draw between Aston Villa and Everton at Wembley.

16 Mar 1977: The Football League Cup final replay at Hillsborough ends in a 1–1 draw.

13 Apr 1977: The Football League Cup final is decided at the third attempt when Aston Villa beat Everton 3–2 in the second replay at Old Trafford. A last minute goal from Brian Little sends the trophy to Villa Park and prevents the possibility of a first-ever major English Cup Final penalty shoot-out.

== FA Cup ==
=== Third round ===
Teams from the Football League First and Second Division entered in this round. The third round of games in the FA Cup were played on 8 January 1977.

Tie no	Home team	Score	Away team	Date
6	Leicester City	0–1	Aston Villa	8 January 1977

=== Fourth round ===
The fourth round of games were played on 29 January 1977. Four games required a replay, played midweek on 1–2 February. Northwich Victoria was the last non-league club left in the competition.

Tie no	Home team	Score	Away team	Date
5	Aston Villa	3–0	West Ham United	29 January 1977

=== Fifth round ===
The fifth set of games took place on 26 February 1977. Holders Southampton were eliminated by Manchester United in a rematch of the previous season's final.

Tie no	Home team	Score	Away team	Date
3	Aston Villa	3–0	Port Vale	26 February 1977

=== Sixth round ===
The sixth round of FA Cup games were played on 19 March 1977. There were no replays.

Tie no	Home team	Score	Away team	Date
4	Manchester United	2–1	Aston Villa	19 March 1977

== Squad ==
All Aston Villa players: 1977 Note: Flags indicate national team as defined under FIFA eligibility rules; some limited exceptions apply. Players may hold more than one non-FIFA nationality.

Pos.	Nation	Player
GK	ENG	John Burridge
DF	ENG	John Robson
DF	SCO	Gordon Smith
DF	WAL	Leighton Phillips
DF	NIR	Chris Nicholl
MF	ENG	Dennis Mortimer
FW	ENG	John Deehan
FW	ENG	Brian Little
FW	SCO	Andy Gray
MF	SCO	Alex Cropley
MF	ENG	Frank Carrodus

Pos.	Nation	Player
DF	ENG	John Gidman
FW	ENG	Ray Graydon
MF	ENG	Gordon Cowans
DF	ENG	Charlie Young
GK	SCO	Jake Findlay
MF	ENG	David Hughes
DF	ENG	Keith Masefield
DF	ENG	Mike Buttress
DF	ENG	Ivor Linton
MF	ENG	Steve Hunt
