= Copper Col =

Copper Col (64°44′00″S 063°23′00″W) is a col at 305 m, between Copper Peak and Billie Peak in the Osterrieth Range of Anvers Island, in the Palmer Archipelago. Probably first seen by the Belgian Antarctic Expedition (1897–99), under Adrien de Gerlache. The name Copper Glacier appears in this position on a chart based on a 1927 survey by Discovery Investigations personnel on the RRS Discovery. The feature was resurveyed in 1955 by the Falkland Islands Dependencies Survey, who reported that col would be a better descriptive term.
