= Fang Buttress =

- Location within Antarctica

Highest point
- Coordinates: 64°41′S 63°21′W

Geography
- Location: Anvers Island, Palmer Archipelago
- Parent range: Osterrieth Range

Geology
- Mountain type: Rock buttress

Fang Buttress (64°41′S 63°21′W) is a rock buttress immediately west of Molar Peak near the south end of the Osterrieth Range of Anvers Island, in the Palmer Archipelago. The buttress has a small but prominent tooth-like rock in front of it and is a landmark for parties crossing William Glacier. It was surveyed by the Falkland Islands Dependencies Survey, 1955–57, and given this descriptive name by the UK Antarctic Place-Names Committee in 1959.
