= Hewitt Bay =

Hewitt Bay (64°49′00″S 63°47′00″W) is a rectangular bay 1 nautical mile (1.9 km) long between Biscoe Point and Access Point on Anvers Island in the Palmer Archipelago. Named by the Advisory Committee on Antarctic Names in 2007 after Roger P. Hewitt of the Antarctic Ecosystem Research Group, Southwest Fisheries Science Center, La Jolla, CA; leader of surveys of the ecosystem in waters adjoining the South Shetland Islands and northern Antarctic Peninsula from 1989 to 2005; convener of the Commission for the Conservation of Antarctic Marine Living Resources (CCAMLR) working group from 2000 to 2005.
