= Green Reef =

Green Reef (64°44′S 63°17′W) is a group of low rocks in Neumayer Channel, lying close east of Green Spur, Anvers Island, in the Palmer Archipelago, Antarctica. It was charted from HMS Snipe in January 1948 and so named because of its proximity to Green Spur.
