= John T. Selden =

US Marine Corps general (1893–1964)

John Taylor Selden
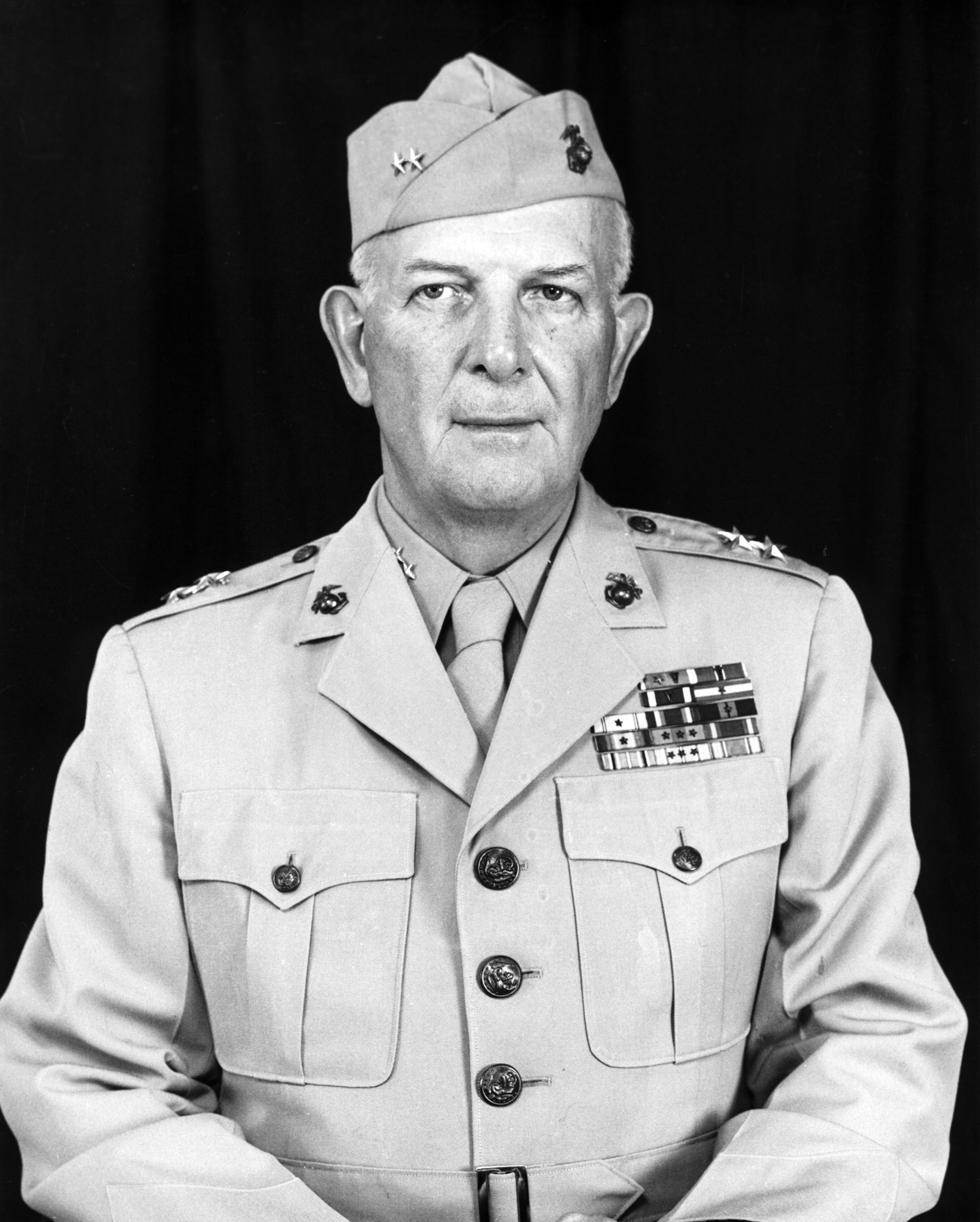
- Major General Selden, USMC
- Born: March 25, 1893; Richmond, Virginia, US
- Died: May 30, 1964 (aged 71); Richmond, Virginia, US
- Burial place: Arlington National Cemetery
- Military career
- Allegiance: United States of America
- Branch: United States Marine Corps
- Service years: 1915–1955
- Rank: Lieutenant general
- Service number: 0-877
- Commands: MCB Camp Pendleton; 1st Marine Division; CoS of 1st Marine Division; 5th Marine Regiment
- Conflicts: Haitian Campaign; World War I Yangtze Patrol; World War II: Guadalcanal Campaign; New Britain campaign; Battle of Cape Gloucester; Battle of Peleliu; Korean War
- Awards: Army Distinguished Service Medal; Legion of Merit (2); Bronze Star Medal

John Taylor Selden (March 25, 1893 – May 30, 1964) was a decorated officer of the United States Marine Corps with the rank of lieutenant general. He commanded the 1st Marine Division during the Korean War and later Marine Corps Base Camp Pendleton.

== Early career ==
John Taylor Selden was born on March 25, 1893, in Richmond, Virginia, as the son of Charles Selden and his wife Elizabeth Temple Taylor. Charles Selden served with the Confederate Army as a member of Company E, 4th Virginia Cavalry during the American Civil War. Young John attended the local McGuire's University School, and, following the graduation, he enrolled at Virginia Polytechnic Institute in Blacksburg, Virginia. However, he dropped out of the school in 1915, eager to see combat in France during the ongoing World War I. Because the United States was neutral at that time, Selden decided for enlistment into the Canadian Army. Told that he would have to give up his American citizenship to do so, he returned to the United States and enlisted in the Marine Corps in January 1915.

Following basic training, Selden sailed for Haiti, where took part in the jungle patrols against hostile rebels called "Cacos". He returned to the States in 1917 and was sent to the Marine Officers' School for Service Afloat at Norfolk Navy Yard. Selden completed the school one year later and was commissioned second lieutenant in July 1918. He was then attached to the Marine detachment aboard the armored cruiser USS Huntington and participated in the convoy escort duties in the Atlantic Ocean.

Selden served for a brief period in Florida, before returning to Haiti for a second time in 1922. He was attached as an instructor to the Garde d'Haïti and later also served as chief of police in Cap-Haïtien until 1925. He later served with the 6th Marine Regiment during the Yangtze Patrol in Shanghai from 1927 to 1928 and later with the American Legation Guard in Peking from 1930 to 1932. He was promoted to the rank of captain on May 16, 1929.

After his return to the United States, Selden was stationed at the Marine barracks within the Norfolk Navy Yard, before he was assigned to the 1st Marine Brigade under the command of Brigadier General Holland Smith as brigade personnel officer. He participated with the 1st Brigade in extended amphibious training in Guantanamo Bay, Cuba. The 1st Brigade was expanded to the 1st Marine Division in February 1941, and Selden was appointed division personnel officer.

== World War II ==
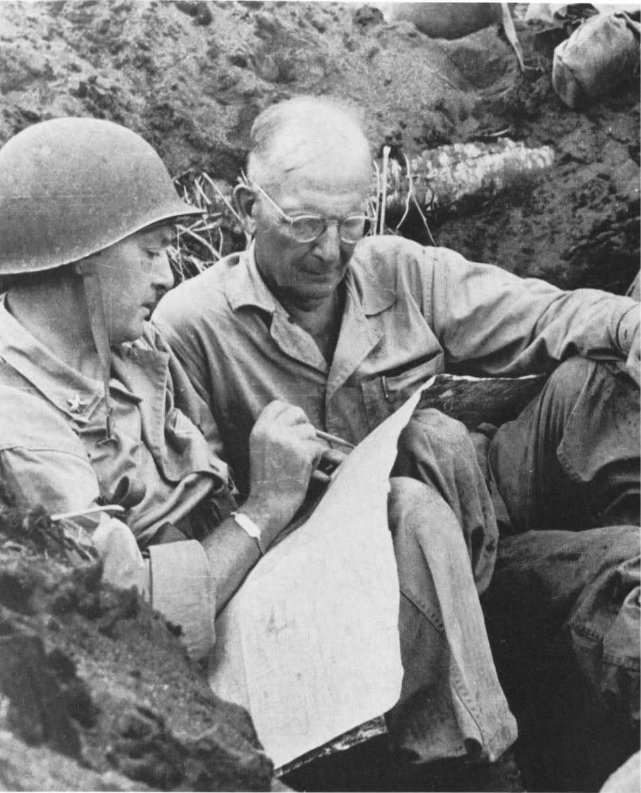
During operations to clear the enemy from the shores of Borgen Bay, New Britain; BG Lemuel C. Shepherd, (left) 1st Marine Division assistant commander, confers with COL John T. Selden (5th Marines).

Selden was stationed on Hawaii with the Pacific Scouting Force at the time of the Japanese attack at Pearl Harbor. He subsequently served as Marine force and intelligence officer aboard the heavy cruiser USS Indianapolis and the aircraft carrier USS Lexington. In this capacity, Selden participated in combat off the coasts of New Guinea and New Britain and was later decorated for his service with the Navy Commendation Medal with Combat "V".

He was appointed Marine officer on the staff of the Amphibious Force, Pacific in April 1942 and was promoted to the rank of colonel in July of the same year. Selden served in this capacity until October 1942, when he was transferred to the staff of the newly activated I Marine Amphibious Corps as corps personnel and intelligence officer. The I Marine Corps was based first at New Caledonia under the command of Major General Clayton Barney Vogel and later participated in the Guadalcanal Campaign.

In May 1943, Selden was transferred to the staff of the 1st Marine Division, stationed for rest and refit in Melbourne, Australia, under Major General Alexander Vandegrift. He remained in that capacity until 29 July 1943, when he relieved Colonel Merritt A. Edson as commanding officer of the 5th Marine Regiment. Selden commanded the 5th Marines during Battle of Cape Gloucester and for his leadership during the battle, he was decorated with the Legion of Merit with Combat "V". He was also awarded the Bronze Star Medal with Combat "V" during this campaign.

Colonel Selden was succeeded by Colonel Oliver P. Smith on March 1, 1944, and subsequently was appointed Chief of staff of 1st Marine Division under the command of Major General William H. Rupertus. In this capacity, Selden participated in Battle of Peleliu and was decorated with his second Legion of Merit for his efforts. He was transferred back to the United States in November 1944 and appointed Chief of Staff of Marine Training and Replacement Command in San Diego area under Major General Charles F. B. Price.

== Postwar career ==
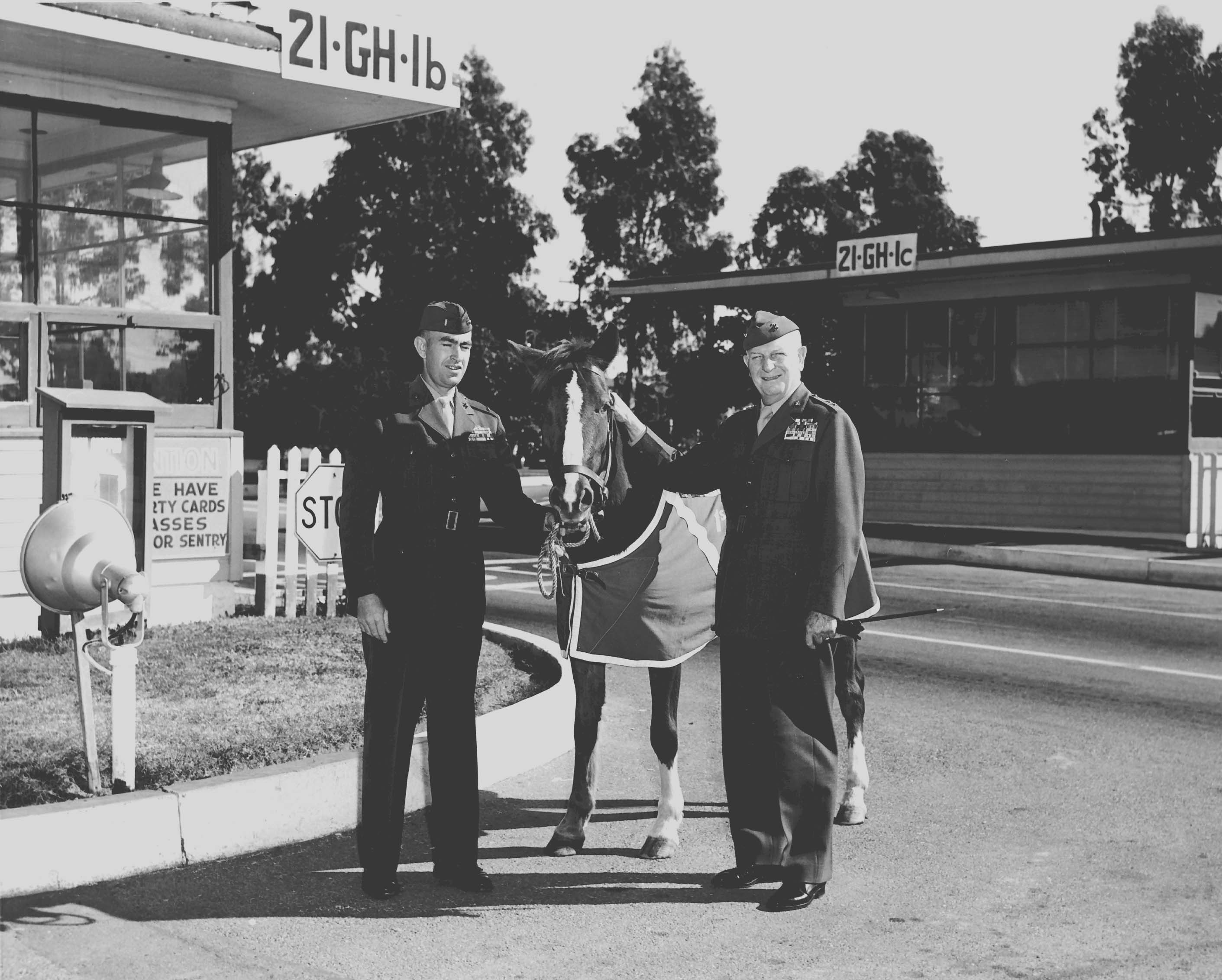
MG John T. Selden, Base CG, congratulates Sgt. Reckless on a job well done, as the wonder horse returns to her home stomping grounds, Camp Pendleton. Reckless is accompanied by her owner, 1stLt Eric T. Pederson. November 1954.

Selden served in San Diego until May 1946, when he was transferred to Coronado, California, as chief of staff of the Troop Training Unit of Amphibious Training Command. He then spent some time with staff of commander in chief, Pacific Fleet, Admiral DeWitt Clinton Ramsey. Selden was promoted to the rank of brigadier general in April 1948 and appointed director of Marine Corps public information and recruiting at Headquarters Marine Corps in Washington, D.C.

He was appointed deputy commander of Camp Lejeune, North Carolina in August 1949 and remained there until June 1951, when he relieved Brigadier General William S. Fellers as commanding officer of the Troop Training Unit at Naval Amphibious Base Coronado, California. During his service there, Selden was promoted to the rank of major general in August 1951.

In January 1952, Major General Selden was transferred to the Korean battlefield to take command of 1st Marine Division. He succeeded Major General Gerald C. Thomas and commanded the 1st Division during the massive redeployment of UN forces designed for greater participation of the South Korean Army. For his service in this capacity, Selden was decorated with the Army Distinguished Service Medal.

At the beginning of September 1952, Selden was appointed inspector general on the staff of the U.S. Commander in Chief, Europe, and remained there until November 1953, when he was ordered back to the United States for his final assignment as commanding general of Marine Corps Base Camp Pendleton, California. He finally retired from the Marine Corps in 1955 and was advanced to the rank of lieutenant general on the retired list for having been specially commended in combat.

Lieutenant General John T. Selden died in his native Richmond, Virginia, on May 30, 1964, and is buried at Arlington National Cemetery, Virginia, together with his wife Gladys Glover Selden (1896–1983). They had one son, Claiborne Taylor Selden (1925–1989), who served in the United States Navy and reached the rank of commander.

== Decorations ==
Here is the ribbon bar of Lieutenant General John T. Selden:

1st Row	Army Distinguished Service Medal		Legion of Merit with one 5/16" gold star and Combat "V"	Bronze Star Medal with Combat "V"	
2nd Row	Navy Commendation Medal with Combat "V"	Navy Presidential Unit Citation with three stars		Navy Unit Commendation	Marine Corps Expeditionary Medal with one star
3rd Row	Haitian Campaign Medal with star	World War I Victory Medal with Escort clasp		Yangtze Service Medal	American Defense Service Medal with Base Clasp
4th Row	American Campaign Medal	Asiatic-Pacific Campaign Medal with four 3/16 inch service stars		World War II Victory Medal	National Defense Service Medal
5th Row	Korean Service Medal with two 3/16 inch service stars	United Nations Korea Medal		Korean Order of Military Merit, Ulchi Medal with Silver Star	Republic of Korea Presidential Unit Citation

=== Army Distinguished Service Medal citation ===
The President of the United States of America, authorized by Act of Congress, July 9, 1918, takes pleasure in presenting the Army Distinguished Service Medal to Major General John Taylor Selden (MCSN: 0-877), United States Marine Corps, for exceptionally meritorious service in a position of great responsibility as commanding general, FIRST Marine Division, in Korea, from 11 January 1952 to 29 August 1952. With superb leadership and professional acuity, General Selden skillfully integrated Republic of Korea Marine Corps and provisional units, greatly augmenting the combat potential of the division, and, through the media of intensive training programs and diplomatic liaison, attained inspirational teamwork which was reflected in the operational skill and esprit de corps of the command. His brilliant exploitation and coordination of air power in support of ground operations and his use of amphibious and helicopter airborne training for infantry and special units, were significant factors in carrying out successful offensive operations and posed an imminent threat to enemy forces beyond the main line of resistance. General Selden's mastery of tactical science, assiduous adaptation of the capabilities of the command, and exemplary achievements materially furthered the United Nations' progression toward world peace, reflecting the utmost credit on himself and upholding the esteemed traditions of the military service.

Military offices
Preceded by James P. Riseley	Commanding General of the Camp Pendleton; November 1953 – April 1955	Succeeded by George F. Good Jr.
Preceded by Gerald C. Thomas	Commanding General of the 1st Marine Division; 11 January 1952 – 28 August 1952	Succeeded by Edwin A. Pollock
