= Venetz Peak =

Mountain in Antarctica

Venetz Peak (80°23′S 25°30′W) is a peak rising to about 1,500 m and surmounting the southeast rim of Bonney Bowl in the Herbert Mountains, Shackleton Range. It was photographed from the air by the U.S. Navy in 1967 and surveyed by British Antarctic Survey (BAS) between 1968 and 1971. In association with the names of glacial geologists grouped in this area, it was named by the United Kingdom Antarctic Place-Names Committee (UK-APC) in 1971 after Ignaz Venetz-Sitten (known as Venetz, 1788–1859), a Swiss engineer and glacial geologist who, in 1821, first expressed in detail the idea that alpine glaciers were formerly much more extensive.

== Sources ==
- Alberts, Fred G., ed. (1995), Geographic Names of the Antarctic (PDF) (2 ed.), United States Board on Geographic Names This article incorporates public domain material from websites or documents of the United States Board on Geographic Names.
