= Access point (disambiguation) =

A wireless access point is a device that allows other Wi-Fi devices to connect to a wireless computer network.

Access point or Access Point may also refer to:

- Access Point (Antarctica), a rocky point on Anvers Island, Antarctica
- Access point, searchable data from fields of records in subject access systems in a bibliographic database
