= Molar Peak =

Mountain in Graham Land, Antarctica

Molar Peak (64°41′S 63°19′W) is a steep-sided peak, 1,065 metres (3,500 ft) high, between Mount Camber and Copper Peak in the Osterrieth Range of Anvers Island, in the Palmer Archipelago, Antarctica. It was named by the UK Antarctic Place-Names Committee following a survey by the Falkland Islands Dependencies Survey in 1955. The descriptive name arose because the peak is shaped like a tooth.
