= Peter Hooper =

Peter Hooper may refer to:

- Peter Hooper (footballer) (1933–2011), English footballer
- Peter Hooper (writer) (1919–1991), New Zealand teacher, writer, bookseller and conservationist
- Peter R. Hooper (1931–2012), British geologist and author
