= Gateway Ridge =

Gateway Ridge (64°43′S 63°33′W) is a serrated rock ridge, over 715 metres (2,350 ft) high, situated southeast of Mount Rennie on Anvers Island, in the Palmer Archipelago off the northwestern coast of the Antarctic Peninsula. It separates Hooper Glacier from William Glacier where the two enter Börgen Bay. It was surveyed by the Falkland Islands Dependencies Survey in 1944 and 1945. The name originated because the snow col at the northern end of the ridge provides the only sledging route between Hooper Glacier and William Glacier.
