= Mount Moberly =

Mountain in Graham Land, Antarctica

Mount Moberly (64°44′S 63°41′W) is a steep-sided, snow-covered mountain, 1,535 metres (5,040 ft) high, at the end of the ridge extending southwest from Mount Français in the southern part of Anvers Island, in the Palmer Archipelago, Antarctica. It is separated from Mount William to the south by the col at the head of Hooper Glacier. In 1832, John Biscoe named a mountain in this area for Captain John Moberly, Royal Navy, but the mountain was not located by subsequent expeditions. This feature was identified as Mount Moberly by the Falkland Islands Dependencies Survey who made surveys in the area in 1944 and 1955.
