= Shaler Cliffs =

Shaler Cliffs (80°17′S 25°29′W) is a rock cliffs 2 miles (3.2 km) east-southeast of Charpentier Pyramid, rising to 1,000 m in the north part of Herbert Mountains, Shackleton Range. Photographed from the air by the United States Navy, 1967, and surveyed by British Antarctic Survey (BAS), 1968–71. In association with the names of glacial geologists grouped in this area, named by the United Kingdom Antarctic Place-Names Committee (UK-APC) after Nathaniel S. Shaler (1841–1906), American geologist, joint author with geographer William Morris Davis of Glaciers (Boston, 1881) and of papers on glacial geology, 1884–92.
