= Henry W. Buse Jr. =

U.S. Marine Corps Lieutenant General

Henry William Buse Jr.
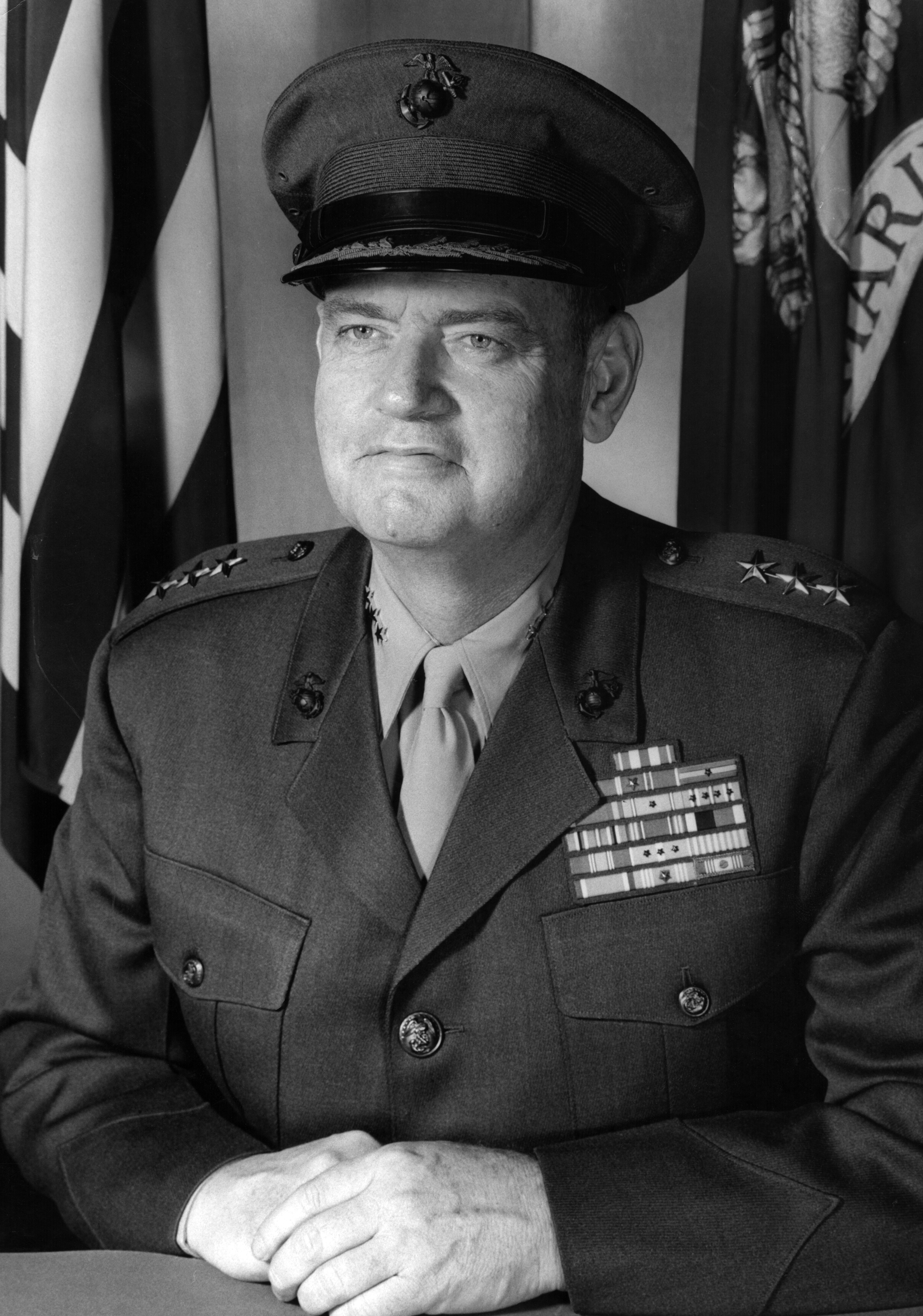
- Lieutenant General Henry W. Buse Jr.
- Born: April 12, 1912; Ridley Park, Pennsylvania, U.S.
- Died: October 19, 1988 (aged 76); Severna Park, Maryland, U.S.
- Burial place: United States Naval Academy Cemetery
- Military career
- Allegiance: United States
- Branch: United States Marine Corps
- Service years: 1934–1970
- Rank: Lieutenant general
- Nickname: "Bill"
- Service number: 0–4993
- Commands: Fleet Marine Force Pacific; 3rd Marine Division; 6th Marine Regiment
- Conflicts: World War II: Battle of Guadalcanal; Solomon Islands campaign; New Britain campaign; Battle of Cape Gloucester; Korean War
- Awards: Navy Distinguished Service Medal (2); Silver Star; Legion of Merit (2); Bronze Star Medal (2)
- Other work: U.S. Olympic Committee

Henry William Buse Jr. (April 12, 1912 – October 19, 1988) was a lieutenant general in the United States Marine Corps. He was Chief of Staff, Headquarters Marine Corps and later commanding general of the Fleet Marine Force Pacific. Following his retirement from the Marine Corps, Buse served as assistant to three former presidents of the U.S. Olympic Committee.

== Early years ==
Henry W. Buse Jr. was born on April 10, 1912, in Ridley Park, Pennsylvania, as the son of Mayor of Ridley Park and employee of Remington Rand, Henry W. Buse and Clara Estelle Tichenor. He graduated from the local high school in summer of 1929 and enrolled at Severn Preparatory school, a preparatory school for the Naval Academy, where he spent one year, before he was admitted to the United States Naval Academy in Annapolis, Maryland, in June 1930. He spent the next four years at Annapolis and graduated on May 31, 1934. Buse was commissioned a second lieutenant in the Marine Corps on the same date and sent to the Basic School at Philadelphia Navy Yard for an officers course. After he completed the course in April 1935, he was attached to the Marine detachment aboard the cruiser USS Oklahoma and spent the following year on sea duty.

In June 1936, Buse was transferred to Marine Barracks Quantico, Virginia, for duty with the 1st Marine Brigade, Fleet Marine Force and remained there until March 1937. He was subsequently ordered to the Marine barracks within Naval Station Pearl Harbor and promoted to first lieutenant in July 1937.

== World War II ==
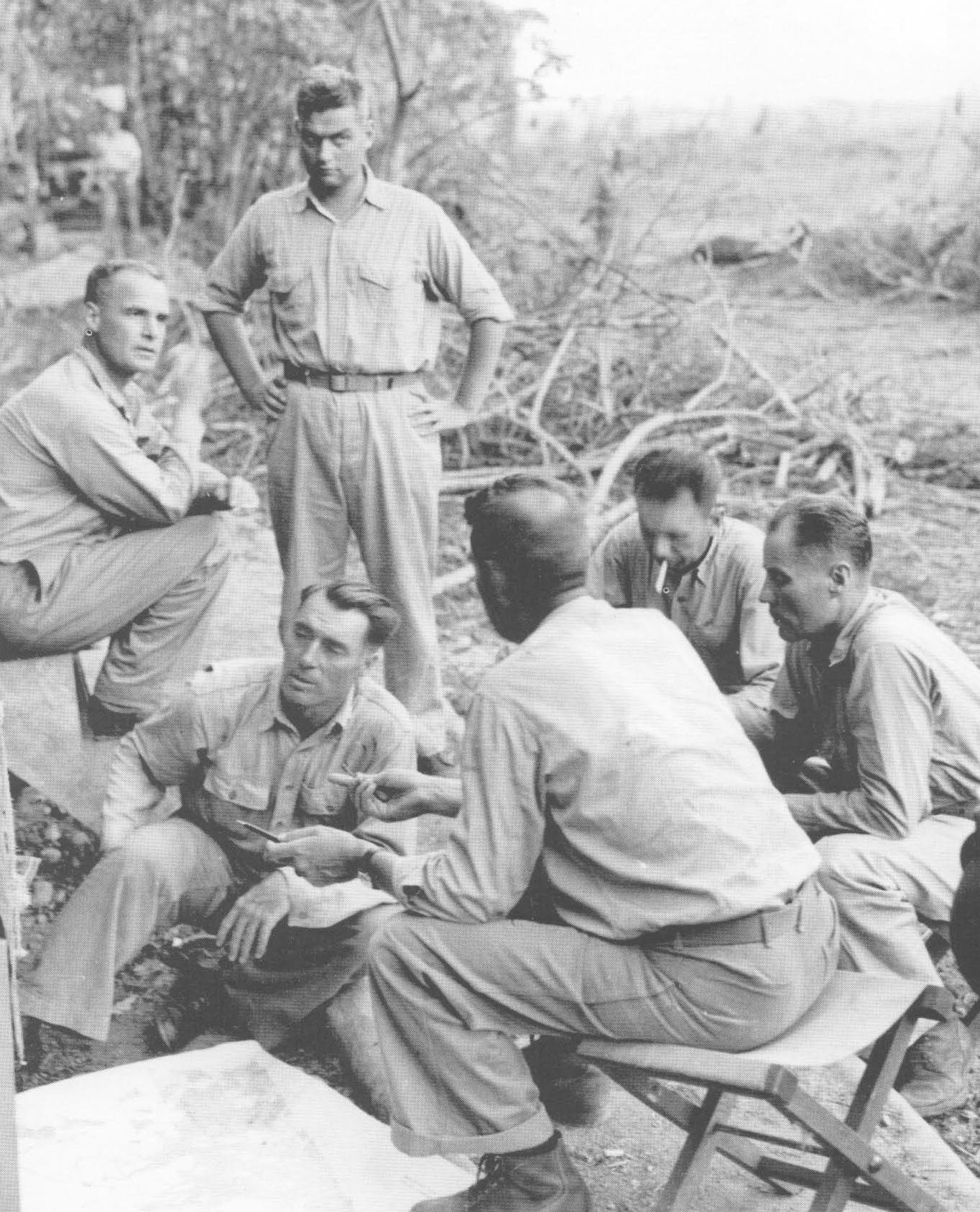
Buse Jr. (standing) with the members of Whaling Group on Guadalcanal in September 1942

In September 1939, Buse has been sent to the Army Infantry School at Fort Benning, Georgia, which he completed in February 1940. He was subsequently ordered back to Marine Barracks Quantico and assigned as company commander to the 5th Marine Regiment under Colonel Charles D. Barrett. Buse was promoted to captain in July 1940 and sailed with his regiment, attached to the 1st Brigade, to Guantánamo, Cuba, two months later.

While in Cuba, Buse was appointed commander of the 1st Division's Scout Company and subsequently returned to Quantico in April 1941. Following the Japanese attack on Pearl Harbor in December 1941, the 1st Marine Division began preparing for combat deployment. Buse was transferred to the 1st Tank Battalion as its executive officer in April 1942 and promoted to the rank of major one month later. The 1st Marine Division under Major General Alexander Vandegrift was subsequently ordered to the South Pacific Area in June 1942 and following arrival at Wellington, New Zealand, Buse was transferred to the staff of the division as assistant operations officer.

Major Buse participated in the landing on Guadalcanal in August 1942 and following its capture, he took part in the island's defense. For his service during the Guadalcanal campaign, he was decorated with the Bronze Star Medal with Combat "V".

Buse was promoted to lieutenant colonel in April 1943 and subsequently participated in the Battle of Cape Gloucester in December 1943. During the same battle, in January 1944, he took temporary command of the 3rd Battalion, 7th Marines. The 3rd Battalion was trying to capture heavily fortified Hill 660, but its advance was halted by the enemy machine gun fire. Buse assumed command of the battalion on January 8, 1944, and led his unit to the victory, capturing the strategic objectives of the operation with a minimum of casualties on his side. For his excellent leadership and gallantry in action, he was decorated with the Silver Star.

Buse remained with the 3rd Battalion until February 20, when he was transferred to the 5th Marine Regiment as its executive officer. When the regimental commander, Colonel Oliver P. Smith, was promoted to division assistant commander, Buse assumed temporary command of the regiment on April 10, 1944. He led the 5th Marines during the final phase of the Cape Gloucester campaign and subsequently received his second Bronze Star Medal for the securing of the village of Talasea.

Buse was succeeded by Colonel William S. Fellers and after two months of service with the 5th Marine Regiment, he was ordered back to the United States in July 1944. He was transferred to Washington, D.C., and assigned to Headquarters Marine Corps, where he was appointed executive officer of the Plans and Operations Section.

== Later career ==
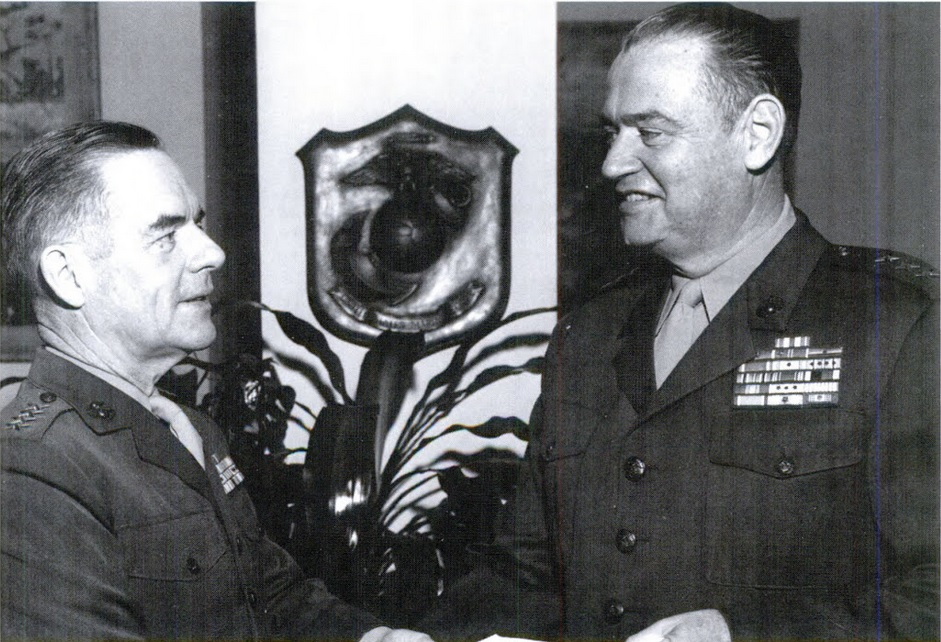
Commandant Wallace M. Greene congratulates deputy chief of staff for plans and programs, Henry W. Buse Jr. on his promotion to lieutenant general on December 30, 1964.

In July 1946, Buse was ordered to Japan to serve as regimental combat team instructor within Troop Training Unit, Amphibious Training Command. He subsequently participated in the amphibious training of 8th Army units. Buse was transferred to Pearl Harbor in February 1947 and appointed assistant chief of staff for logistics within Fleet Marine Force Pacific under Lieutenant General Allen H. Turnage.

Buse returned to the States in February 1949 and subsequently attended the Armed Forces Staff College in Norfolk, Virginia. Upon his graduation in June 1949, he was transferred to the Marine Corps Schools in Quantico, Virginia, and appointed commanding officer of the 22nd Marine Regiment, which served as the training unit for new Marine Corps officers at the Basic School. The 22nd Marines were inactivated at the beginning of October 1949 and its troops were incorporated into the School Troops. Buse was promoted to the rank of colonel on the same time and appointed commanding officer of the School Troops. He remained at Quantico and later commanded the Special Training Regiment stationed there.

Colonel Buse was transferred to Camp Lejeune in September 1950 and assumed command of the 6th Marine Regiment stationed there. The 6th Marines were attached to the 2nd Marine Division and Buse was transferred to the divisional staff and appointed assistant chief of staff for operations and training.

At the end of September 1952, Buse was ordered to Korea and assigned to the staff of the 1st Marine Division under Major General Edwin A. Pollock. Buse subsequently succeeded Colonel Austin R. Brunelli as Division Chief of Staff on October 11 and later participated in the defense of the western front. Buse participated in the battles of the Samichon River and Outpost Vegas. For his service in this capacity, he was decorated with the Legion of Merit with Combat "V".

Buse was replaced by Colonel Lewis W. Walt on June 14, 1953, and transferred back to the United States the following month. His next assignment was again with the Plans and Operations Section at Headquarters Marine Corps. In July 1954, Major General Edwin A. Pollock was appointed commanding general of the Marine Corps Recruit Depot Parris Island, South Carolina and, aware of Buse's skills as a staff officer, chose him as his chief of staff.

Buse worked with Pollock for the next three years. When General Pollock was appointed Commanding General Fleet Marine Force Pacific on Hawaii at the beginning of August 1956, Buse followed him as his chief of staff. When Pollock was transferred to Naval Station Norfolk, Virginia as Commanding General Fleet Marine Force Atlantic in December 1957, Buse went with him, again as his chief of staff. While in this capacity, he was promoted to the rank of brigadier general in August 1958.

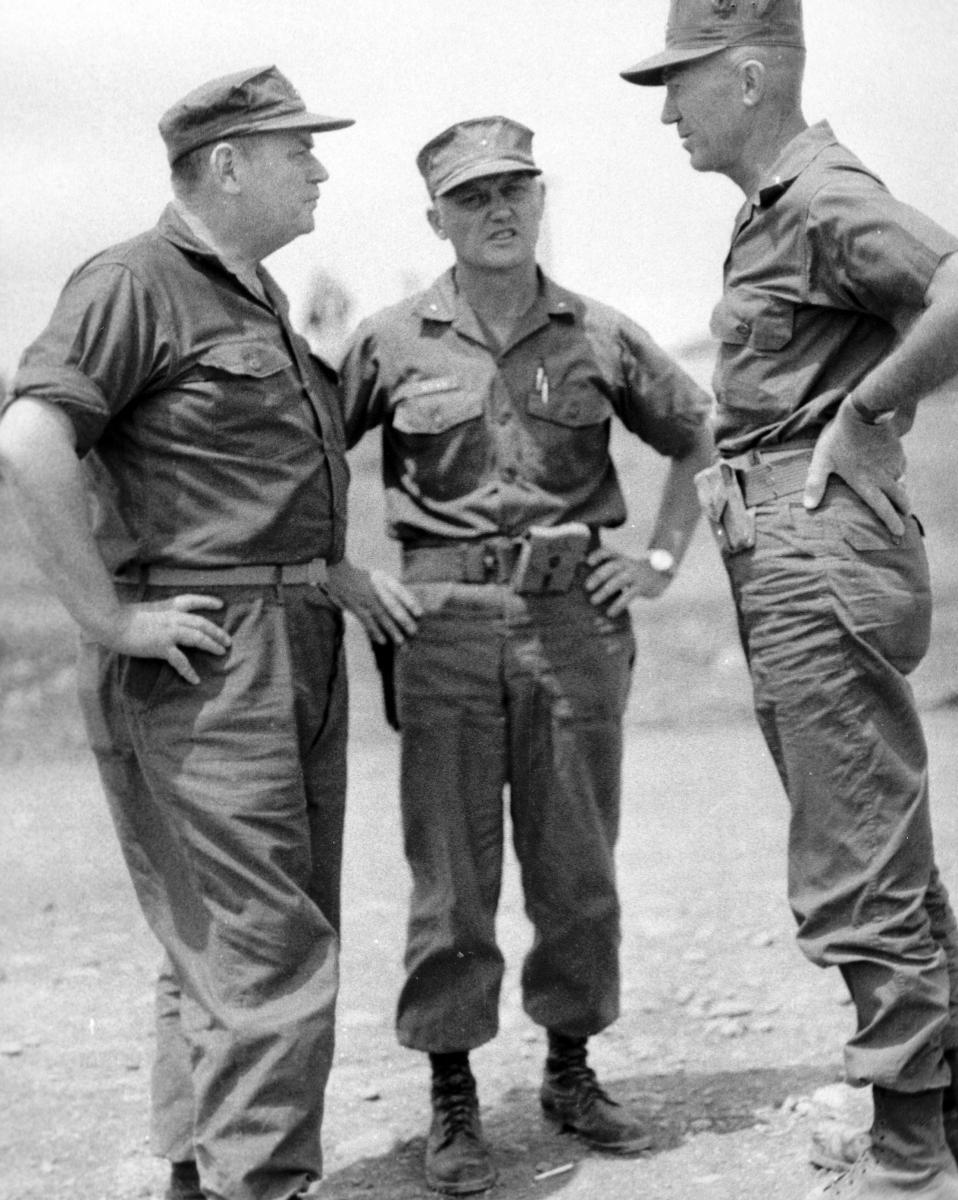
Lieutenant General Henry W. Buse, Jr., Brigadier General Michael P. Ryan, and Major General Bruno A. Hochmuth (both 3rd Marine Division) discuss matters of the coming events for Camp Carroll, Vietnam.

Buse was transferred to Washington, D.C., during the following month and appointed Marine Corps liaison officer in the office of the Vice Chief of Naval Operations under Admiral James S. Russell. He was transferred to Headquarters Marine Corps in September 1961 and appointed assistant chief of staff for plans and operations. Buse succeeded Brigadier General Sidney S. Wade, while Wade was assigned to the office of the Vice Chief of Naval Operations as Marine Corps liaison officer.

Buse was transferred to Okinawa and assumed command of the 3rd Marine Division at the beginning of June 1962. As the senior Marine commander in the Western Pacific area, he was designated commander of Task Force 79, the amphibious striking army of the U.S. Seventh Fleet. While in this position, Buse was promoted to the rank of major general on July 1, 1962.

This duty ended at the beginning of May 1963, when Buse was ordered back to Washington, D.C., where he was appointed deputy chief of staff for plans and programs in the office of the Commandant of the Marine Corps, General Wallace M. Greene. This post was upgraded by President Lyndon B. Johnson and Buse was promoted to the rank of lieutenant general on December 29, 1964. He later received his second Legion of Merit.

At the beginning of July 1967, Buse was appointed chief of staff, Headquarters Marine Corps. However this assignment lasted until May 31, 1968, when he received the Navy Distinguished Service Medal for his service in this capacity and was transferred to Hawaii.

There he was appointed Commanding General Fleet Marine Force Pacific, in charge of all Marine units in the Pacific. He frequently visited the combat zone in Vietnam and always moved immediately to forward areas to assess operational requirements, investigate problem areas, and encourage and assist his Marines in every way possible. Under Lieutenant General Buse's dynamic leadership, Marine infantry units were reorganized into well-coordinated, mobile elements, the command's electronic warfare operational capability increased to a degree unparalleled in Marine aviation history, and numerous major amphibious operations were planned and executed with tremendous success.

Buse was relieved by General William K. Jones on July 1, 1970, and subsequently retired from the military service. He distinguished himself in his last assignment and received his second Navy Distinguished Service Medal.

== Retirement ==
Following his retirement from the Marine Corps, Buse served on the U.S. Olympic Committee, where he was on the executive committee and later was secretary and also assistant to three former presidents of the committee. He then settled in Severna Park, Maryland, and served there as member of the school board. Buse was also a member of the Naval Academy Alumni Association and Naval Academy Chapel.

Henry W. Buse died on October 18, 1988, at his home in Severna Park, Maryland. He is buried at United States Naval Academy Cemetery together with his wife, Dorothy Snow Buse. They had a daughter, Barbara, and a son, Henry W. Buse III, who also served in the Marine Corps and retired as a colonel.

== Decorations ==
Here is the ribbon bar of Lieutenant General Henry William Buse, Jr.:

1st Row	Navy Distinguished Service Medal with one 5/16" Gold Star		Silver Star	
2nd Row	Legion of Merit with Combat "V" and one 5/16" Gold Star	Bronze Star Medal with Combat "V" and one 5/16" Gold Star	Navy Presidential Unit Citation with one star	Navy Unit Commendation
3rd Row	American Defense Service Medal with Base Clasp	Asiatic-Pacific Campaign Medal with four 3/16 inch service stars	American Campaign Medal	World War II Victory Medal
4th Row	Navy Occupation Service Medal	National Defense Service Medal with one star	Korean Service Medal with three 3/16 inch service stars	Dutch Order of Orange-Nassau, Knight with swords
5th Row	National Order of Vietnam, Commander	United Nations Korea Medal	Order of Military Merit, Ulchi Medal with Silver Star	Republic of Korea Presidential Unit Citation

Military offices
Preceded by Victor H. Krulak	Commanding General of the Fleet Marine Force Pacific; June 1, 1968 – July 1, 1970	Succeeded by William K. Jones
Preceded by Leonard F. Chapman Jr.	Chief of Staff, Headquarters Marine Corps; July 1, 1967 – May 31, 1968	Succeeded by William J. Van Ryzin
Preceded by Robert E. Cushman Jr.	Commanding General of the 3rd Marine Division; June 4, 1962 – May 9, 1963	Succeeded by James M. Masters, Sr.
