= Sauria Buttress =

Sauria Buttress (80°32′S 20°24′W) is a rock buttress situated in Coats Land, Antarctica, rising to about 1,300 m lying to the southeast of Lundstrom Knoll in Pioneers Escarpment, Shackleton Range. The buttress was photographed from the air by the U.S. Navy in 1967. Surveyed by the British Antarctic Survey from 1968 to 1971. In association with the names of pioneers of polar life and travel grouped in this area, named by the United Kingdom Antarctic Place-Names Committee in 1971 after Charles-Marc Sauria (b. 1812), French inventor of the first practical friction match in 1831.
