= Walker Cricket Ground =

Sports ground in Southgate, London, England

Coordinates: 51°37′31.78″N 0°07′45.26″W

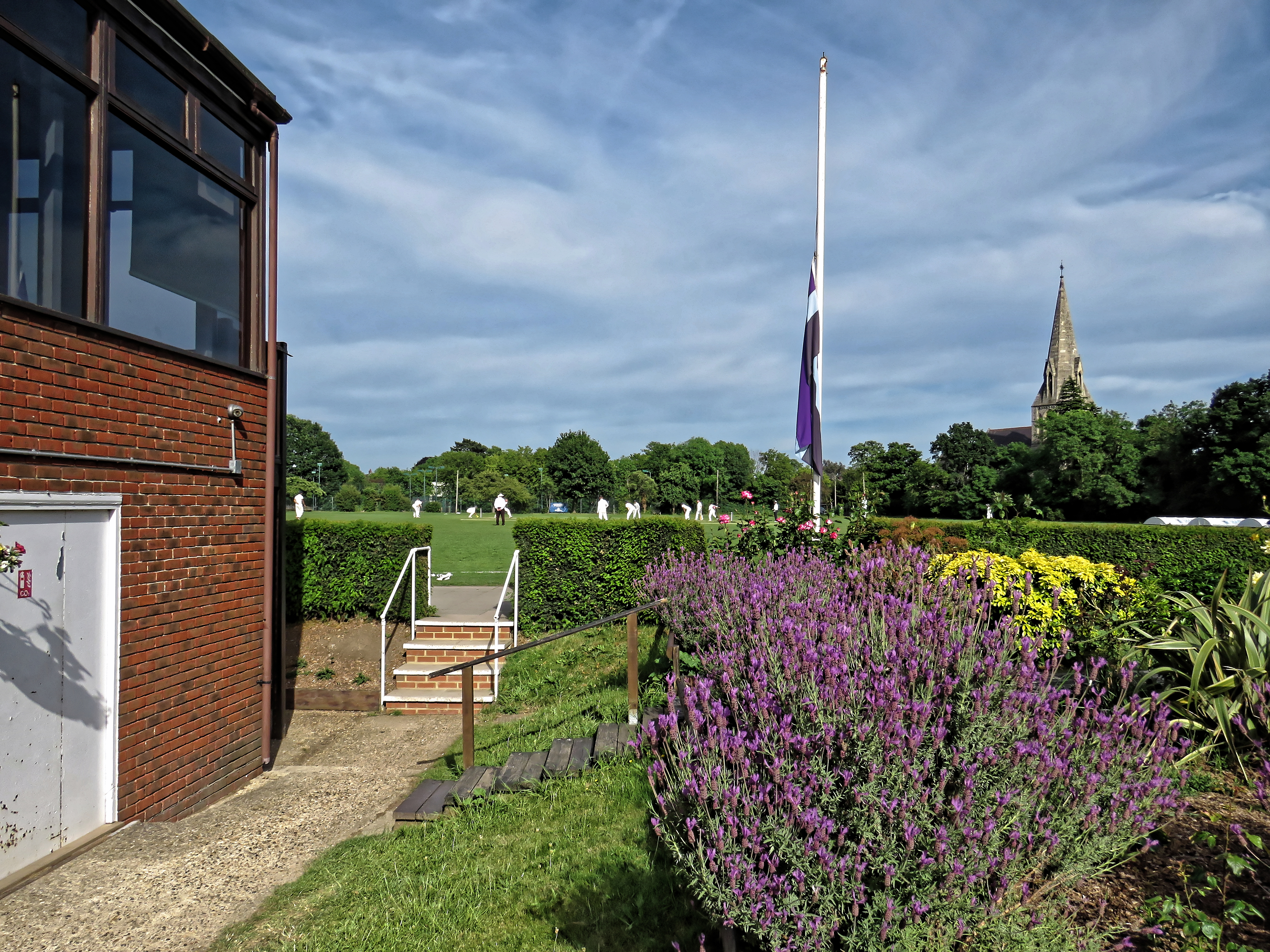
- Walker Cricket Ground and garden, Southgate, London, England
- Interactive map of Walker Cricket Ground

Ground information
- Location: Southgate, Middlesex
- Country: England
- Establishment: 1859 (first recorded match)

International information
- Only women's ODI: 5 July 2011: India v New Zealand

Team information
Middlesex	(1859-2011)
- As of 6 September 2020; Source: Ground profile

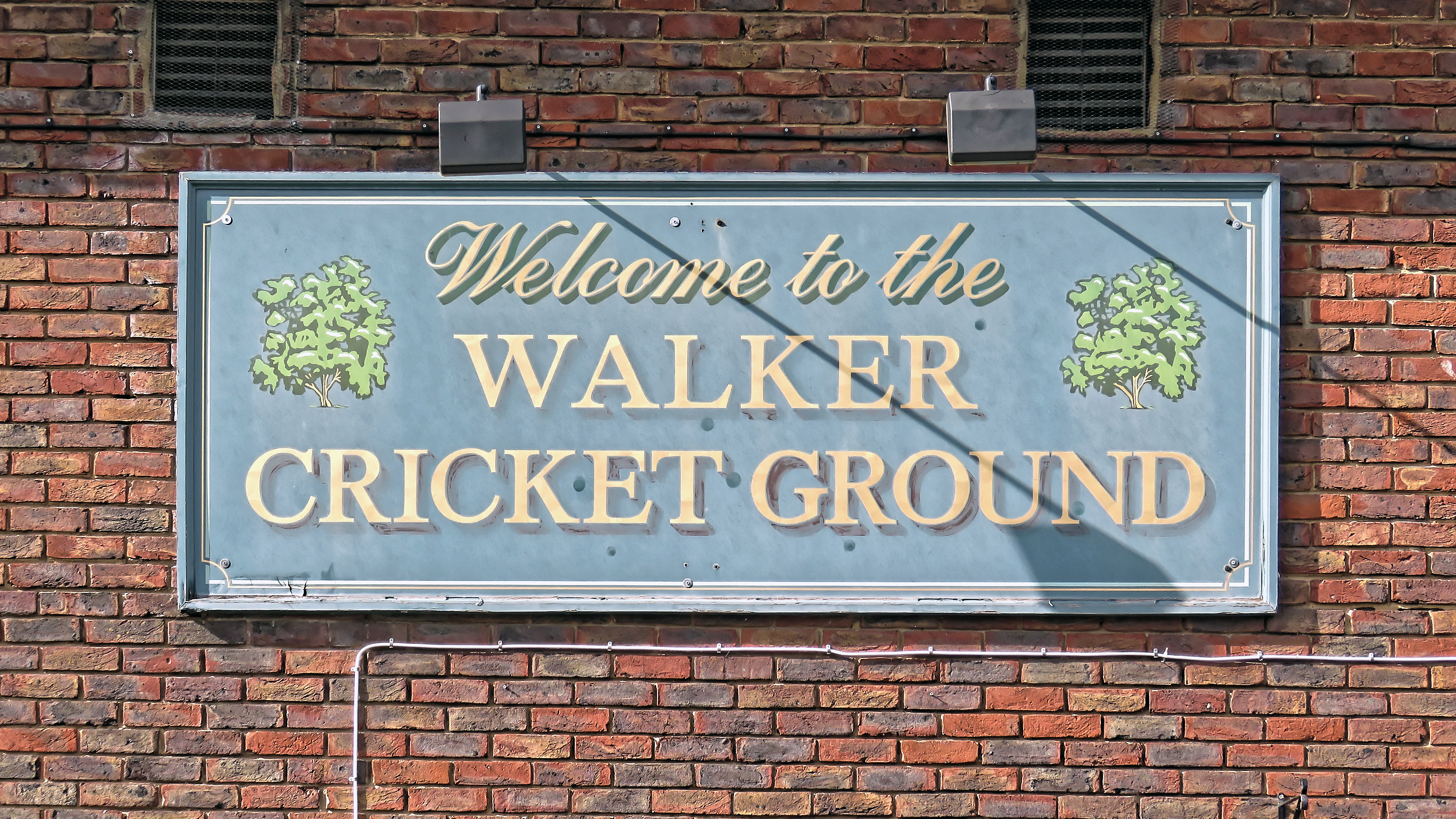

The Walker Cricket Ground is a trust-operated multi-sport ground at Southgate, in the borough of Enfield and the historic county of Middlesex, London, England. There are three cricket fields, cricket pavilions for two clubs. There are four outdoor tennis courts, and accommodation for rugby union, lacrosse, squash, racketball, hockey, junior-level football, and scout clubs.

The ground, previously Chapel Fields, is named after John Walker, the Middlesex player who founded the ground. It was first used by the Middlesex County Cricket Club 1st XI in 1859, but had to wait until 1991 for its next county match, and until 1998 to become a regular Middlesex venue. The ground is used by Southgate Cricket Club and Southgate Adelaide Cricket Club. Other tenants include Southgate Squash & Racketball Club, Southgate Rugby Club, Oakhill Tigers Football Club, Omonia Youth Football Club, Southgate Weld Tennis Club and Southgate Adelaide Hockey Club.

Game Information:

Game Type	No. of Games
County Championship Matches	18
limited-over county matches	20
Twenty20 matches	4

Game Statistics: first-class:

Category	Information
Highest Team Score	Middlesex (695/5dec against Leicestershire) in 2003
Lowest Team Score	Kent (47 against Middlesex) in 1859
Best Batting Performance	Mike Gatting (241 Runs for Middlesex against Essex) in 1998
Best Bowling Performance	George Wigzell (7/21 for Kent against Middlesex) in 1859

Game Statistics: one-day matches:

Category	Information
Highest Team Score	Middlesex (337/5 in 45 overs against Somerset) in 2003
Lowest Team Score	Somerset (58 in 28.3 overs against Middlesex) in 2000
Best Batting Performance	Owais Shah (125 Runs for Middlesex against Yorkshire) in 2004
Best Bowling Performance	Ashley Cowan (5/14 for Essex against Middlesex) in 2001

Game Statistics: Twenty20:

Category	Information
Highest Team Score	Middlesex (185/6 in 20 overs against Essex) in 2005
Lowest Team Score	Hampshire (111 in 19.3 overs against Middlesex) in 2006
Best Batting Performance	Owais Shah (79 Runs for Middlesex against Essex) in 2005
Best Bowling Performance	Johann Louw (4/18 for Middlesex against Hampshire) in 2006
