= 1972–73 Aston Villa F.C. season =

English football club season

Aston Villa
1972–73 season
- Chairman: Doug Ellis
- Manager: Vic Crowe
- Stadium: Villa Park
- Second Division: 3rd
- FA Cup: Third round
- League Cup: Third round

The 1972–73 English football season was Aston Villa's 74th season in the Football League, this season playing in the Football League Second Division. Under manager Vic Crowe Aston Villa won promotion in the previous season as champions with a record 70 points, and thus ended their two-year spell in the Third Division. By the end of the decade they would be firmly re-established as a First Division club.

The 1972 FA Charity Shield was contested between Manchester City and Aston Villa with City winning 1–0, following a penalty from striker Francis Lee. Normally, the Charity Shield would have been contested by the First Division champions and FA Cup holders, who were Derby County and Leeds United respectively, but both declined the chance to play in the Charity Shield. Instead, Manchester City, who had finished in fourth place in the First Division; and Aston Villa, who finished as Third Division champions accepted the invitation to play. The match was played at Villa Park.

There were debut appearances for John Gidman (197), John Robson (144) Alun Evans (60), Keith Leonard (38), and Bobby McDonald (39).

== Second Division ==
Pos	Team	Pld	W	D	L	GF	GA	GAv	Pts	Qualification or relegation
1	Burnley (C, P)	42	24	14	4	72	35	2.057	62	Promotion to the First Division
2	Queens Park Rangers (P)	42	24	13	5	81	37	2.189	61	Promotion to the First Division
3	Aston Villa	42	18	14	10	51	47	1.085	50	
4	Middlesbrough	42	17	13	12	46	43	1.070	47	
5	Bristol City	42	17	12	13	63	51	1.235	46	Qualification for the Watney Cup

Rules for classification: 1) Points; 2) Goal average; 3) Goals scored
(C) Champions; (P) Promoted

=== Matches ===
12 August 1972	Preston North End	0–1	Aston Villa
		Report	Willie Anderson

19 August 1972	Aston Villa	2–0	Huddersfield Town	Villa Park
	Geoff Vowden; Ray Graydon	Report

26 August 1972	Burnley	4–1	Aston Villa
		Report	Chico Hamilton

29 August 1972	Aston Villa	1–0	Carlisle United	Villa Park
	Bruce Rioch	Report

2 September 1972	Aston Villa	1–1	Brighton	Villa Park
	Andy Lochhead	Report

9 September 1972	Cardiff City	0–2	Aston Villa
		Report	Bruce Rioch; Andy Lochhead

16 September 1972	Aston Villa	2–1	Swindon Town	Villa Park
	Alun Evans; Andy Lochhead	Report

23 September 1972	Nottingham Forest	1–1	Aston Villa
		Report	Own goal

27 September 1972	Aston Villa	2–0	Sunderland	Villa Park
	Alun Evans; Bruce Rioch	Report

30 September 1972	Aston Villa	1–0	Millwall	Villa Park
	Bruce Rioch, pen	Report

7 October 1972	Fulham	2–0	Aston Villa
		Report

14 October 1972	Aston Villa	0–1	Queens Park Rangers	Villa Park
		Report

17 October 1972	Blackpool	1–1	Aston Villa
		Report	Alun Evans

21 October 1972	Portsmouth	0–1	Aston Villa
		Report	Geoff Vowden

28 October 1972	Aston Villa	1–1	Middlesbrough	Villa Park
	Geoff Vowden	Report

4 November 1972	Sunderland	2–2	Aston Villa
		Report	Bruce Rioch; Brian Little

11 November 1972	Aston Villa	0–0	Blackpool	Villa Park
		Report

18 November 1972	Aston Villa	0–2	Luton Town	Villa Park
		Report

25 November 1972	Oxford United	2–0	Aston Villa
		Report

2 December 1972	Aston Villa	2–0	Hull City	Villa Park
	Ray Graydon, pen; Chico Hamilton	Report

16 December 1972	Aston Villa	1–0	Leyton Orient	Villa Park
	Alun Evans	Report

23 December 1972	Sheffield Wednesday	2–2	Aston Villa
		Report	Ray Graydon (2)

26 December 1972	Aston Villa	2–2	Nottingham Forest	Villa Park
	Andy Lochhead; Alun Evans	Report

30 December 1972	Huddersfield Town	1–1	Aston Villa
		Report	Alun Evans

6 January 1973	Aston Villa	0–3	Burnley	Villa Park
		Report

20 January 1973	Brighton	1–3	Aston Villa
		Report	Alun Evans; Ray Graydon; Jimmy Brown

27 January 1973	Aston Villa	2–0	Cardiff City	Villa Park
	Ray Graydon, pen; Bruce Rioch	Report

10 February 1973	Swindon Town	1–3	Aston Villa
		Report	Alun Evans; Ray Graydon (2)

17 February 1973	Aston Villa	1–1	Preston North End	Villa Park
	Charlie Aitken	Report

24 February 1973	Leyton Orient	4–0	Aston Villa
		Report

3 March 1973	Aston Villa	2–3	Fulham	Villa Park
	Brian Little; Bruce Rioch	Report

10 March 1973	Queens Park Rangers	1–0	Aston Villa
		Report

17 March 1973	Aston Villa	2–0	Portsmouth	Villa Park
	Geoff Vowden; Pat McMahon	Report

24 March 1973	Middlesbrough	1–1	Aston Villa
		Report	Pat McMahon

27 March 1973	Bristol City	3–0	Aston Villa
		Report

31 March 1973	Aston Villa	2–1	Oxford United	Villa Park
	Pat McMahon; Geoff Vowden	Report

7 April 1973	Hull City	1–2	Aston Villa
		Report	Chico Hamilton; Brian Little

14 April 1973	Aston Villa	1–0	Bristol City	Villa Park
	Neil Rioch	Report

21 April 1973	Luton Town	0–0	Aston Villa
		Report

23 April 1973	Millwall	1–1	Aston Villa
		Report	Ray Graydon

24 April 1973	Aston Villa	2–1	Sheffield Wednesday	Villa Park
	Andy Lochhead; Chico Hamilton	Report

28 April 1973	Carlisle United	2–2	Aston Villa
		Report	Andy Lochhead; Chico Hamilton

Source: avfchistory.co.uk

== FA Cup ==
The 44 First and Second Division clubs entered the competition at the Third round. The matches were scheduled Saturday, 13 January 1973, with the exception of the Reading–Doncaster Rovers game, which was played on the following Wednesday. Eleven matches were drawn, of which two required a second replay.

The first attempted replay between Nottingham Forest and West Bromwich Albion was abandoned in the 81st minute with the score at 1–1 due to fog at the City Ground. It was successfully re-staged six days later but was drawn 0–0, necessitating a second replay at Filbert Street.

Barnet, Chelmsford City and Margate were the last non-league sides left in the competition.

Tie no	Home team	Score	Away team	Date
10	Everton	3–2	Aston Villa	13 January 1973

== League Cup ==
=== First round ===
Home team	Score	Away team	Date
Aston Villa	4–1	Hereford United	16 August 1972

=== Second round ===
Home team	Score	Away team	Date
Nottingham Forest	0–1	Aston Villa	5 September 1972

=== Third round ===
Home team	Score	Away team	Date
Aston Villa	1–1	Leeds United	4 October 1972

Replay

Home team	Score	Away team	Date
Leeds United	2–0	Aston Villa	11 October 1972

== FA Charity Shield ==
5 August 1972

Manchester City	1–0	Aston Villa
Lee	Report

Villa Park, Birmingham

Manchester City	Aston Villa
