= Hooper Glacier =

Glacier in Antarctica

- Location within Antarctica
- Location: Palmer Archipelago
- Coordinates: 64°44′S 63°37′W
- Length: 3 nmi (6 km; 3 mi)
- Thickness: unknown
- Terminus: Börgen Bay
- Status: unknown

Hooper Glacier (64°44′S 63°37′W) is a glacier 3 nautical miles (6 km) long, flowing from the col north of Mount William into the west side of Börgen Bay, Anvers Island, in the Palmer Archipelago, Antarctica. It was surveyed by the Falkland Islands Dependencies Survey (FIDS) in 1955, and named by the UK Antarctic Place-Names Committee for Peter R. Hooper of FIDS, leader and geologist at the Arthur Harbour station in 1955 and 1956. Gateway Ridge separates Hooper Glacier from William Glacier.

== See also ==
- List of glaciers in the Antarctic
- Glaciology
