= Mount Ancla =

Mountain in Palmer Archipelago

Mount Ancla (64°49′S 63°41′W) is a mountain, 815 m, which is snow-covered except for a rock ridge on its south side, standing 2 nautical miles (3.7 km) north of Cape Lancaster, Anvers Island, in the Palmer Archipelago. The mountain was surveyed by the Falkland Islands Dependencies Survey (FIDS) in 1944 and 1955. The name Monte Ancla ("anchor mountain") first appears on an Argentine government chart of 1950.

== See also ==
- Land Surveying
