= Wallace M. Greene =

United States Marine Corps general (1907–2003)

Wallace Martin Greene Jr.
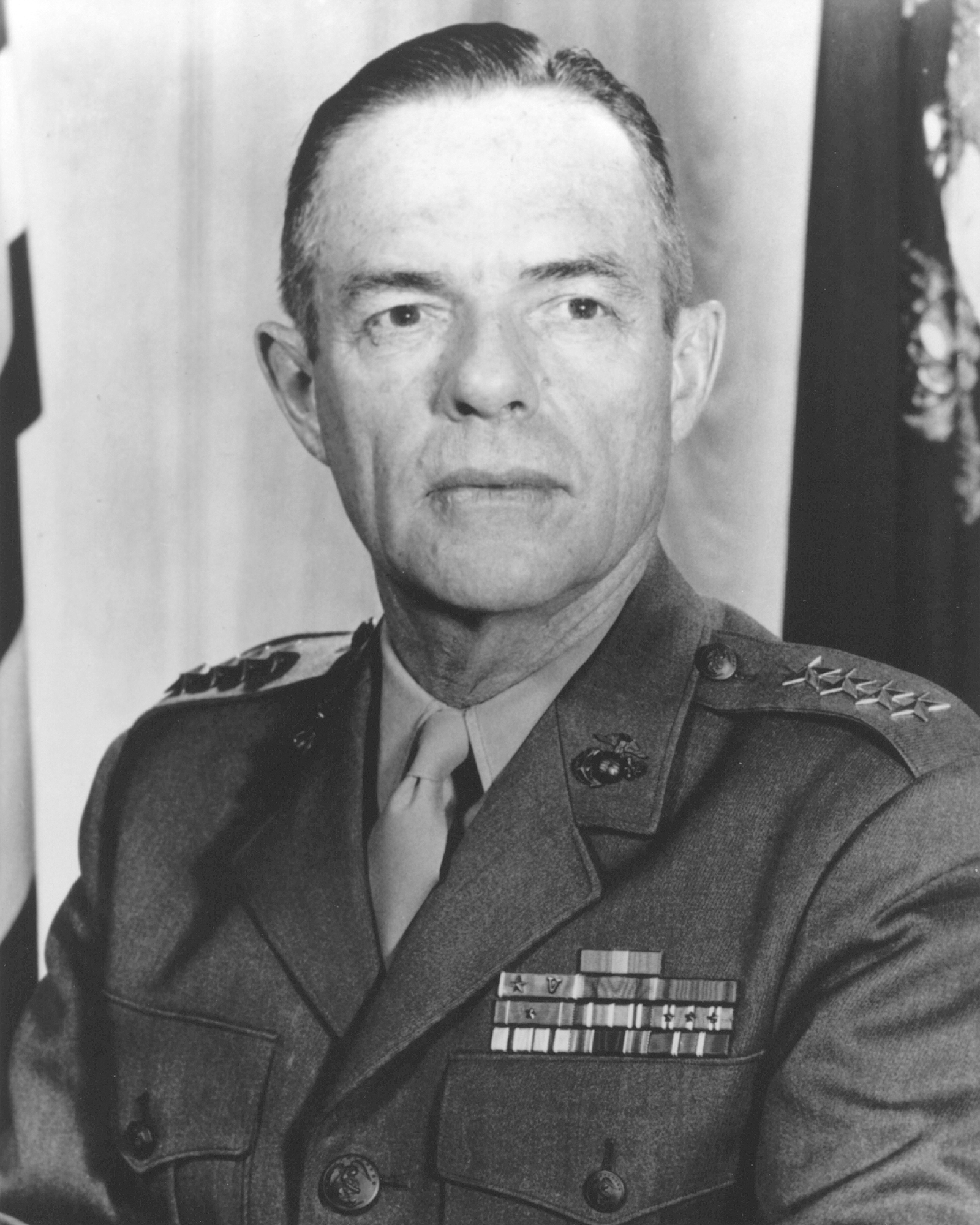
- General Wallace M. Greene Jr.
- Born: December 27, 1907; Waterbury, Vermont, U.S.
- Died: March 8, 2003 (aged 95); Alexandria, Virginia, U.S.
- Burial place: Arlington National Cemetery
- Military career
- Allegiance: United States of America
- Branch: United States Marine Corps
- Service years: 1927–1967
- Rank: General
- Commands: Commandant of the Marine Corps; Marine Corps Base Camp Lejeune; Marine Corps Recruit Depot Parris Island; Recruit Training Command, Parris Island
- Conflicts: World War II: Battle of Kwajalein; Battle of Saipan; Battle of Tinian
- Awards: Navy Distinguished Service Medal (2); Legion of Merit (2)

Wallace Martin Greene Jr. (December 27, 1907 – March 8, 2003) was a United States Marine Corps four-star general who served as the 23rd Commandant of the Marine Corps from January 1, 1964, to December 31, 1967.

Greene served in China in the 1930s, in the South Pacific in World War II, and was commandant during the military buildup in Southeast Asia and when the first United States troops entered South Vietnam. During Greene's tenure as commandant, the Marine Corps grew from 178,000 active-duty personnel to nearly 300,000. He retired at the end of his term as commandant, having served 40 years in the Marine Corps.

== Early life ==
Wallace Martin Greene Jr. was born on December 27, 1907, in Waterbury, Vermont. In 1925, he graduated from high school in Burlington, Vermont, then attended the University of Vermont for a year before entering the United States Naval Academy in Annapolis, Maryland.

== Marine Corps career ==
Upon graduation from the Naval Academy on June 5, 1930, Greene was commissioned a second lieutenant in the United States Marine Corps and ordered to Marine Officers' Basic School at the Philadelphia Navy Yard. After completing Basic School in June 1931, Greene served for a year at the Marine Barracks, Portsmouth Naval Shipyard, Kittery, Maine. In July 1932, he completed the Sea School at San Diego, California, and joined the Marine Detachment aboard the USS Tennessee. Returning from sea duty in March 1934, he served briefly at Pensacola, Florida, and Quantico, Virginia, before reporting to the Marine Barracks, Naval Air Station Lakehurst, New Jersey, that November. He was promoted to first lieutenant the same month.

Except for a temporary assignment at Edgewood Arsenal, Maryland, where he completed a course in the Chemical Warfare School, Greene remained stationed at Lakehurst until March 1936. After that, he served at Marine Corps Recruit Depot San Diego, until he sailed for Guam in October 1936. He was stationed there until June 1937, when he embarked for Shanghai, China, to join the 4th Marine Regiment. In September 1937, the 4th Marines became a part of the 2nd Marine Brigade and Greene was promoted to captain.

Along with his unit, Greene was commended for performance of duty while attached to the defense forces of the International Settlement during the Sino-Japanese hostilities of 1937 and 1938. Upon his return from China in August 1939, he entered the Junior Course, Marine Corps Schools, Quantico. He completed the course in May 1940, then took command of the 1st Chemical Company, 1st Marine Brigade, sailing with it that October for Guantanamo Bay, Cuba. While there, the brigade was redesignated the 1st Marine Division.

Returning with his unit in April 1941, Greene served at Quantico and New River (later Camp Lejeune), North Carolina, as assistant operations officer, 1st Marine Division. In November 1941, he was ordered to London, England, as a Special Naval Observer. During that assignment, he attended the British Amphibious Warfare School in Inverary, Scotland, and the Royal Engineer Demolitions School in Ripon, York. He was promoted to major in January 1942 and returned to the United States the following month.

Named Assistant Chief of Staff, G-3, 3rd Marine Brigade, in March 1942, Greene sailed with the brigade for Upolu, Western Samoa, the following month. He was promoted to lieutenant colonel in August 1942 and remained on Samoa until November 1943 when he joined the V Amphibious Corps in Hawaii.

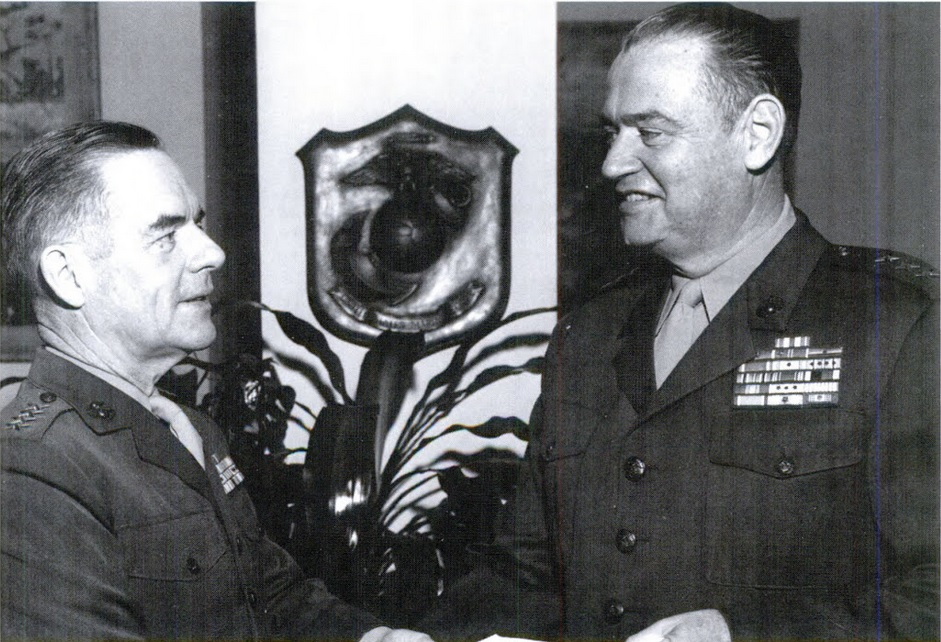
Commandant Wallace M. Greene congratulates Deputy Chief of Staff for Plans and Programs, Henry W. Buse Jr. on his promotion to lieutenant general on December 30, 1964.

For outstanding service as assistant chief of staff, G-3, Tactical Group One, during the planning and execution of the Marshall Islands invasion, Greene was awarded his first Legion of Merit with Combat "V". Following the disbanding of the group in March 1944, he joined the 2nd Marine Division as G-3, earning a second Legion of Merit for outstanding service in this capacity prior to and during combat on Saipan and Tinian. He remained with the 2nd Division until his return to the United States in September 1944.

In October 1944, Greene was appointed officer in charge, G-3, Operations, Division of Plans and Policies, Headquarters Marine Corps (HQMC). He held that post until July 1945, then served as executive officer, Special Services Branch, Personnel Department. In April 1946, he was ordered to Little Creek, Virginia, as G-3, Troop Training Unit, Amphibious Training Command, United States Atlantic Fleet. While there, he was promoted to colonel in February 1948, with rank from August 1947.

Detached from Little Creek in June 1948, Greene reported to Pearl Harbor that August as G-3, Fleet Marine Force (FMF), Pacific. He returned from that assignment in June 1950 and for the next two years was Chief of the Combined Arms Section, Marine Corps Schools, Quantico. He also served briefly as Chief of the Coordination and Evaluation Section there, before entering the National War College, Washington, in August 1952. He graduated in June 1953 and the following month became Staff Special Assistant to the Joint Chiefs of Staff for National Security Council Affairs. Prior to his departure from Washington, he was promoted to brigadier general on September 1, 1955. Later that September, Greene assumed duty as assistant commander, 2nd Marine Division, Camp Lejeune. In May 1956, he was transferred to the Marine Corps Recruit Depot Parris Island, South Carolina, where he served as commanding general, Recruit Training Command, until March 1957, when he became commanding general of the Recruit Depot. That July, he became commanding general of the Marine Corps Base, Camp Lejeune.

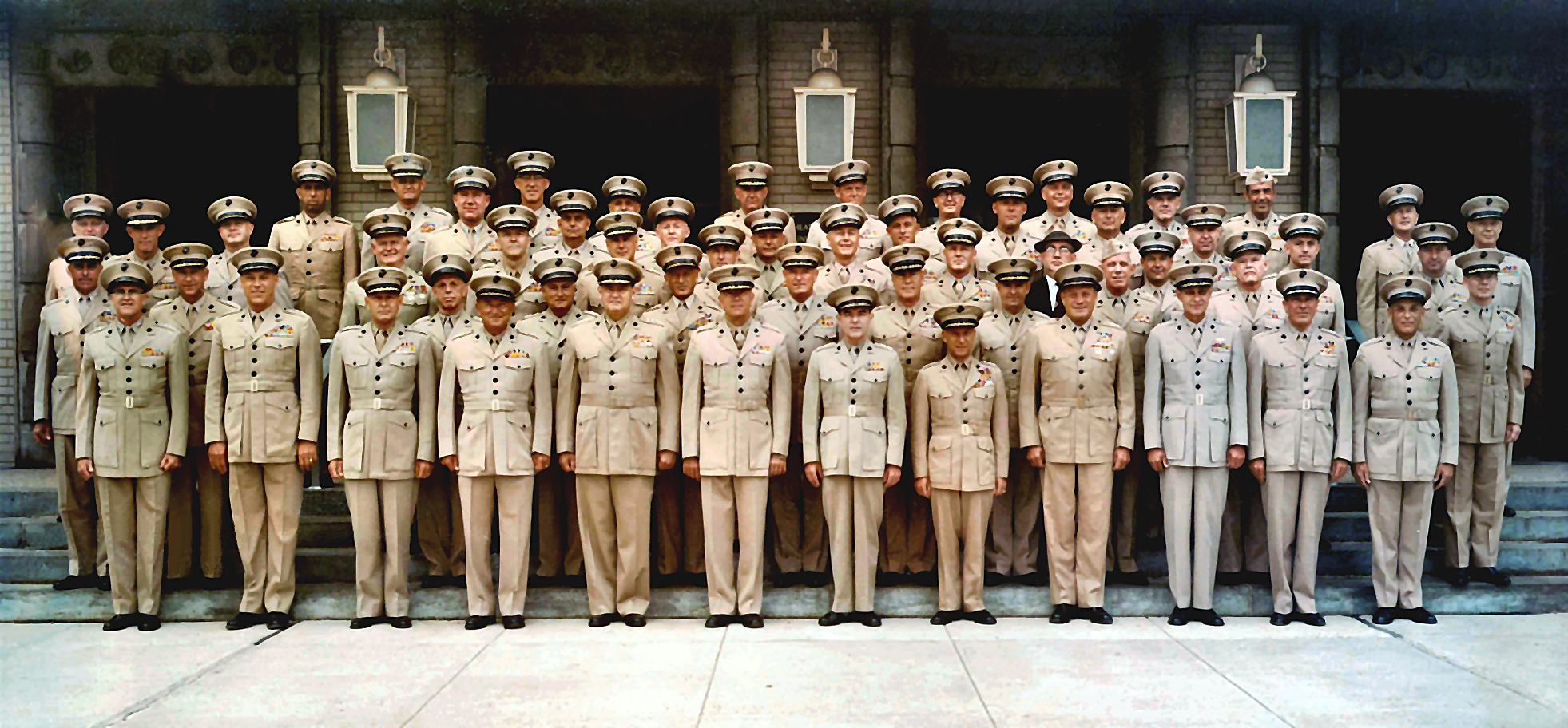
Greene (front row, 7th from left) at the 1967 General Officers' Symposium

In January 1958, Greene reported to HQMC as assistant chief of staff, G-3. While serving in this capacity, he was promoted to major general in August 1958. Following this assignment, he served from March through December 1959 as deputy chief of staff (plans) – an assignment for which he earned his first Navy Distinguished Service Medal. On January 1, 1960, he was designated as chief of staff, with the rank of lieutenant general.

Greene was nominated by President John F. Kennedy on September 24, 1963, to become the 23rd Commandant of the Marine Corps for a four-year term. Upon assuming his post as commandant on January 1, 1964, he was promoted to four-star rank. During his tenure, there was a proliferation of troops in Southeast Asia. In 1964, there were fewer than a thousand Marines in Vietnam but by 1968, the III Marine Amphibious Force in Vietnam numbered more than 100,000 Marines and sailors. During his tour as commandant, he was awarded a second Navy Distinguished Service Medal in December 1967.

== Post-military and legacy ==
Greene retired on December 31, 1967. He was a founding member of the Marine Corps Heritage Foundation. Greene died on March 8, 2003, in Alexandria, Virginia, at age 95. He was buried with full military honors in Arlington National Cemetery.

Beginning in 1987, the Marine Corps Heritage Foundation awarded the General Wallace M. Greene Jr. Award to an author of a nonfiction book, published during the preceding three years pertinent to Marine Corps history.

== Decorations and awards ==

Navy Distinguished Service Medal w/ 1 star	Legion of Merit w/ 1 star & valor device	Navy Unit Commendation	
China Service Medal	American Defense Service Medal w/ 1 star ("Base" clasp)	American Campaign Medal	European-African-Middle Eastern Campaign Medal
Asiatic-Pacific Campaign Medal w/ 3 stars	World War II Victory Medal	National Defense Service Medal w/ 1 star	Order of the Cloud and Banner, 2nd class (Grand Cordon)
The Order of Service Merit, First Class (Blue Stripes Medal)	Order of the Southern Cross, Grand Officer (Brazil)	Brazilian Order of Naval Merit, Grand Officer	National Order of Vietnam, Commander Grade

== Personal ==
Greene was married to the former Vaughn H. Emory (d. 2001) in 1931. They had two children, a son, retired Marine Lieutenant Colonel Wallace M. Greene III and a daughter, Vaughn.

== Education ==
- University of Vermont, 1925.
- U.S. Naval Academy, Annapolis, Maryland, graduated June 5, 1930.
- Marine Officers Basic School, Philadelphia Navy Yard, June 1931.
- Sea School, USN, San Diego, California, 1932.
- Chemical Warfare School, Edgewood Arsenal, Maryland.
- Junior Course, Marine Corps Schools, Quantico, Virginia, 1939–1940.
- British Amphibious Warfare School, Inverary, Scotland, 1941.
- Royal Engineer Demolitions School, Ripon, York, England, 1941.
- National War College, Washington, D.C., August 1952 – June 1953.

Military offices
Preceded by David M. Shoup	Commandant of the Marine Corps; 1964–1967	Succeeded by Leonard F. Chapman Jr.
