= John Walker (cricketer, born 1826) =

English cricketer

- Born: 15 September 1826; Palmers Green, Edmonton, England
- Died: 14 August 1885 (aged 58); Arnos Grove, Southgate, Middlesex, England
- Monuments: Walker Cricket Ground
- Education: Trinity College, Cambridge
- Relatives: The Walkers of Southgate
- Cricket career

Cricket information
- Batting: Right-handed
- Bowling: Underarm right-arm slow

Domestic team information
- Years: Team
- 1846–1849: Cambridge University
- 1847–1863: Marylebone
- 1850–1863: Middlesex XI
- 1864–1866: Middlesex

John Walker (15 September 1826 – 14 August 1885) was an English cricketer.

Walker was born in Palmers Green, the eldest of seven cricket playing brothers and four sisters - known historically as The Walkers of Southgate. He was educated in Stanmore and at Trinity College, Cambridge. He played as a right-handed batsman and an underarm right-arm slow bowler for Cambridge University (1846–1849), Marylebone Cricket Club (MCC) (1847–1863), a Middlesex XI (1850–1863) and Middlesex County Cricket Club (1864–1866).

His family owned a large estate at Arnos Grove and he founded the John Walker Cricket Ground, in Waterfall Road, Southgate. It is run today by the Walker Trust.

William Buttress, a fellow cricketer, was financially supported by Walker at certain times (due to the former's precarious career).

Walker died at Arnos Grove in 1885, aged 58.
