= Mount Camber =

Mountain in Graham Land, Antarctica

Mount Camber (64°41′S 63°16′W) is a mainly snow-covered mountain, 1,400 metres (4,600 ft) high, 1 nautical mile (2 km) northeast of Molar Peak in the Osterrieth Range of Anvers Island, in the Palmer Archipelago. It was first seen by the Belgian Antarctic Expedition, 1897–99, under Gerlache. The name High Peak was probably given to the feature by Lieutenant Commander J.M. Chaplin, Royal Navy, during a sketch survey in 1927 on the RRS Discovery. A resurvey in 1955 by the Falkland Islands Dependencies Survey found this descriptive name to be unsuitable. The new name, given by the UK Antarctic Place-Names Committee, is descriptive of the summit, which is long and gently sloping like a cambered road surface.

== See also ==
- Gerlache Strait Geology
- Anvers Island Geology
