= Clifford Peak =

Peak in Antarctica

Clifford Peak (64°34′S 62°53′W) is a peak, 1,160 metres (3,800 ft) high, at the northeast end of the Osterrieth Range, Anvers Island, in the Palmer Archipelago. It was probably first seen by the Belgian Antarctic Expedition, 1897–99, under Gerlache. The peak was named by members of HMS Snipe following an Antarctic cruise in January 1948, for Sir G. Miles Clifford.
