= Bonney Bowl =

Eastantarctica

Coordinates: 80°21′S 25°35′W

Bonney Bowl is a cirque to the southeast of Sumgin Buttress in the west-central part of the Herbert Mountains, Shackleton Range. It was photographed from the air by the U.S. Navy, 1967, and surveyed by the British Antarctic Survey, 1968–71. In association with the names of glacial geologists grouped in this area, it was named by the UK Antarctic Place-Names Committee in 1971 after the Reverend Thomas George Bonney (1833–1923), English geologist who worked on the origin of cirques; he was Professor of Geology, University College London, 1877–1901.
