= Green Spur =

Landform in Antarctica

Green Spur (64°43′S 63°20′W) is a green colored spur extending from Copper Peak, on the southeast side of Anvers Island, in the Palmer Archipelago of Antarctica. It was probably first seen by the Belgian Antarctic Expedition under Gerlache, 1897–99. The name appears on a map based upon a 1927 survey by Discovery Investigations personnel on the Discovery, but may reflect an earlier naming.
