= Bisco =

Bisco or BISCO may refer to:

People

- Joy Bisco (b. 1975), American actress
- Christie Bisco, the maiden name of Christie Colin (b. 1982), American archer
- Bisco Hatori (b. 1975), Japanese manga artist

Other

- BISCO, the abbreviation for British Iron & Steel Corporation
- BSSCO, pronounced "bisko," the abbreviation for bismuth strontium calcium copper oxide, a family of high-temperature superconductors
- Disco Biscuits, a Philadelphia-based Livetronica band

See also

- Biscoe (disambiguation)
- Bisko
