= Osterrieth Range =

Mountain range on Anvers Island, Antarctica

Osterrieth Range (64°40′S 63°15′W) is a mountain range extending in a NE-SW direction along the southeast coast of Anvers Island, in the Palmer Archipelago. Discovered by the Belgian Antarctic Expedition, 1897–99, under Gerlache, and named by him for Mme. Ernest Osterrieth, née Léonie Mols, a patron of the expedition.

== Peaks ==
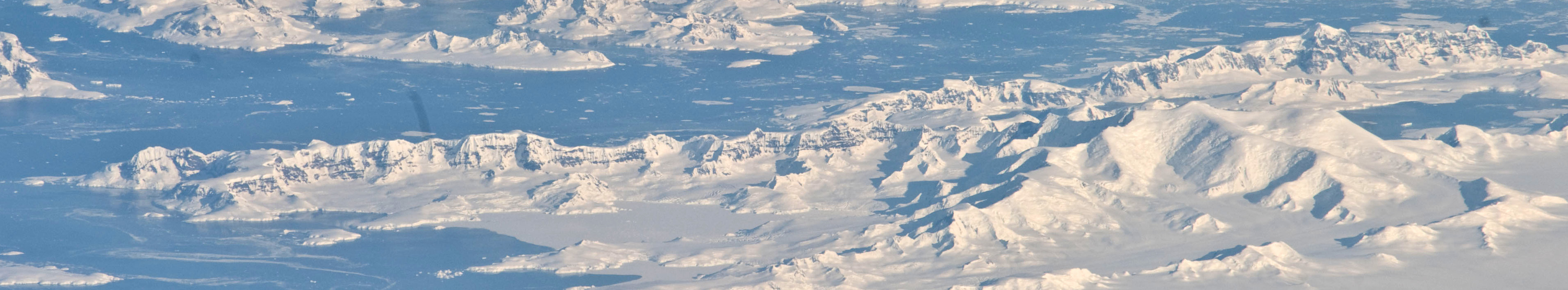
Osterrieth Range and Mount Français, Clifford Peaks (left in photo, taken from ISS)

- Mount Ancla
- Mount Camber
- Clifford Peak
- Mount Français
- Mount Moberly
- Mount Rennie
- Mount William
