= Neumayer Channel =

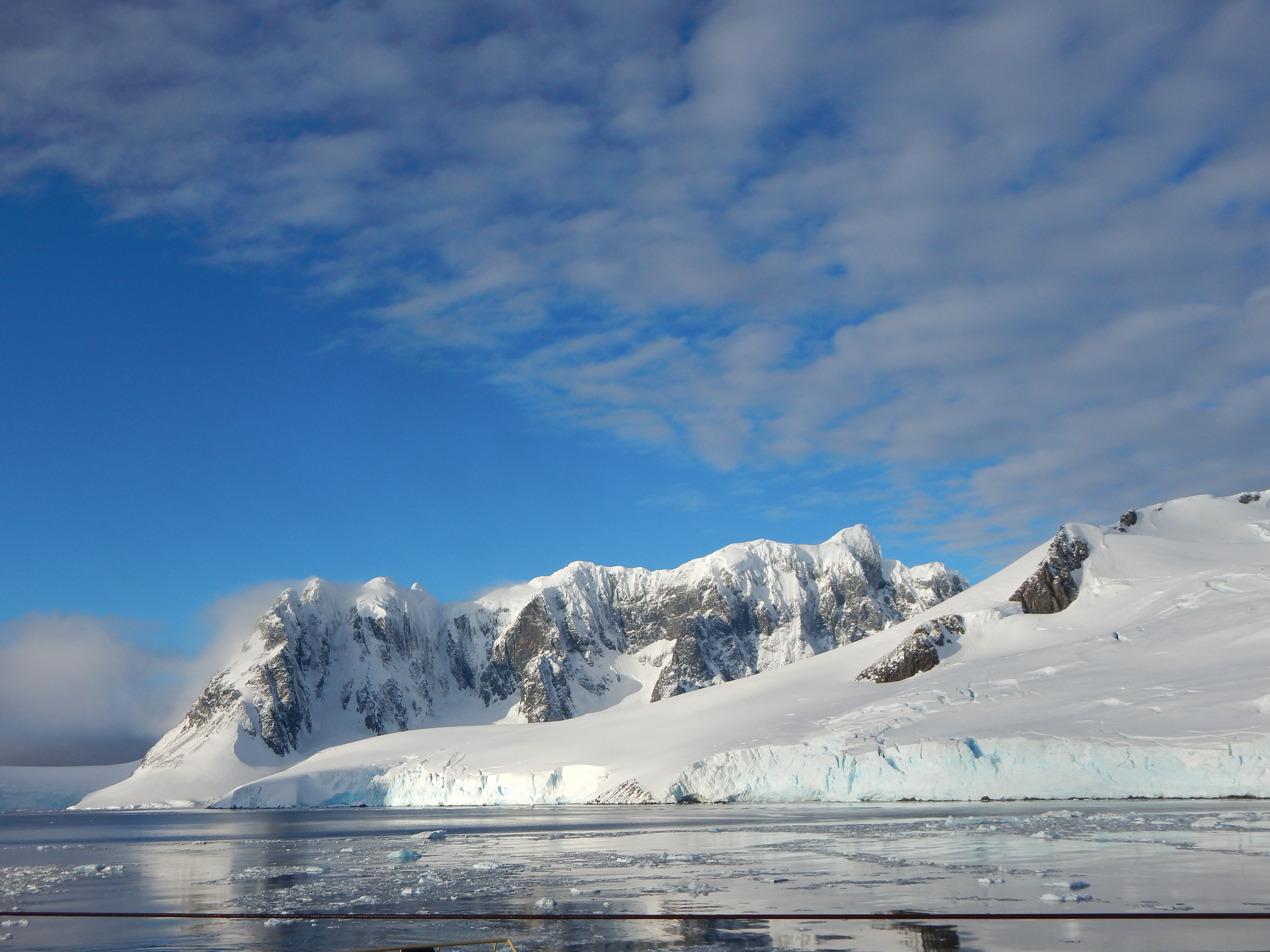
Neumayer Channel

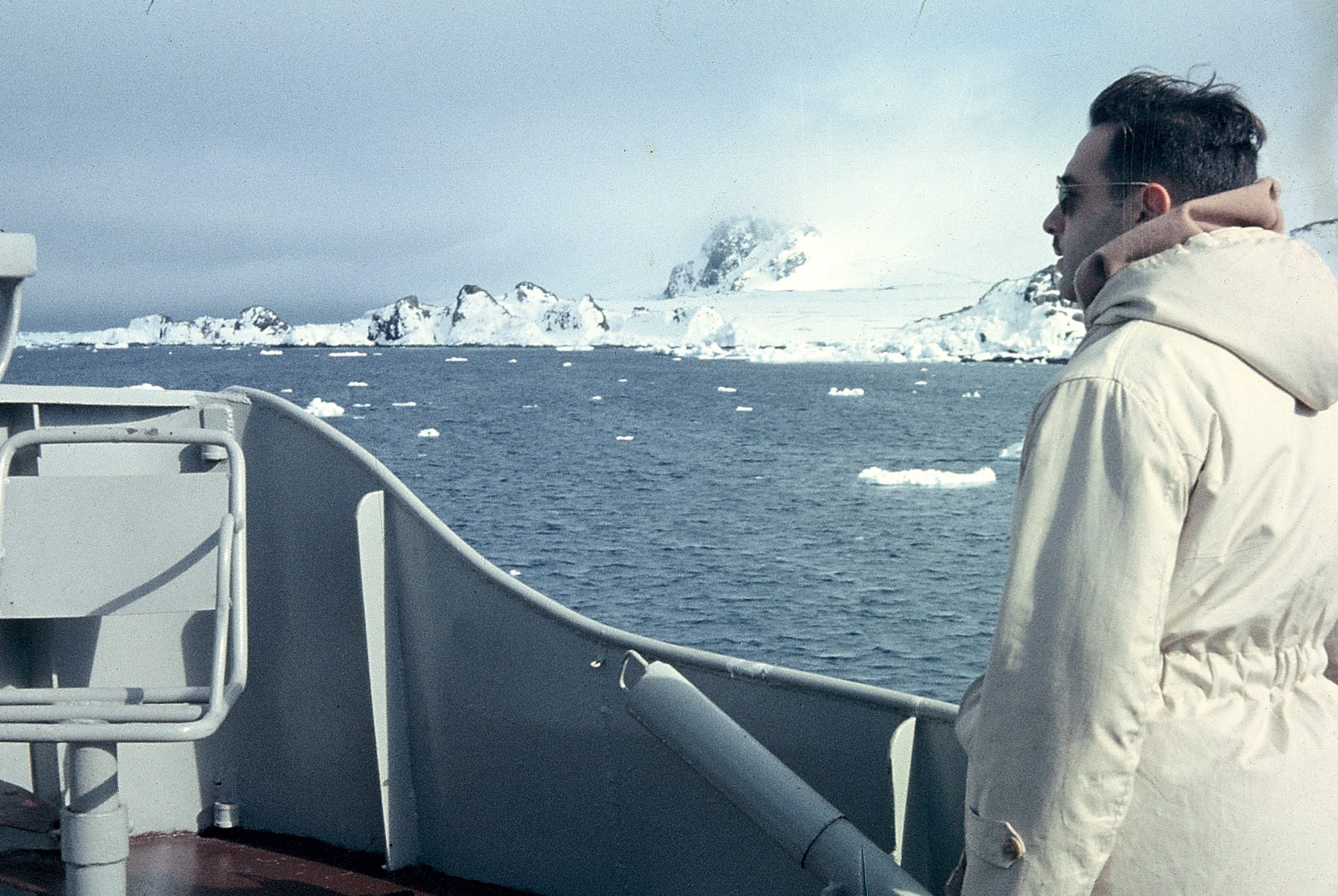
The Neumayer Channel

Neumayer Channel (64°47′S 63°27′W) is a channel 16 miles (26 km) long in a NE-SW direction and about 1.5 miles (2.4 km) wide, separating Anvers Island from Wiencke Island and Doumer Island, in the Palmer Archipelago. The southwest entrance to this channel was seen by Eduard Dallmann, leader of the German 1873-74 expedition, who named it Roosen Channel. The Belgian Antarctic Expedition, 1897–99, under Gerlache, sailed through the channel and named it for Georg von Neumayer. The second name has been approved because of more general usage.

Neumayer Channel is renowned for its dramatic cliffs, drawing tourists to the region. It is often likened to a maze due to its inverted S-shape, where both the entrance and exits feature sharp bends, creating a challenging and scenic navigational experience.

== Geology ==
The Neumayer Channel Tectonic Block is bounded by the Neumayer Fault and the Fournier Fault, which are parallel SW-NE trending strike-slip faults. The block consists of an Early Tertiary granite-granodiorite pluton intruded by a system of Early of Late Tertiary vertical dykes. These intrusive rocks are overlain by basaltic-trachyandesitic lavas and tuffs.

== See also ==
- Gerlache Strait Geology
- Green Reef
