= Mount William (Antarctica) =

Mountain in Antarctica

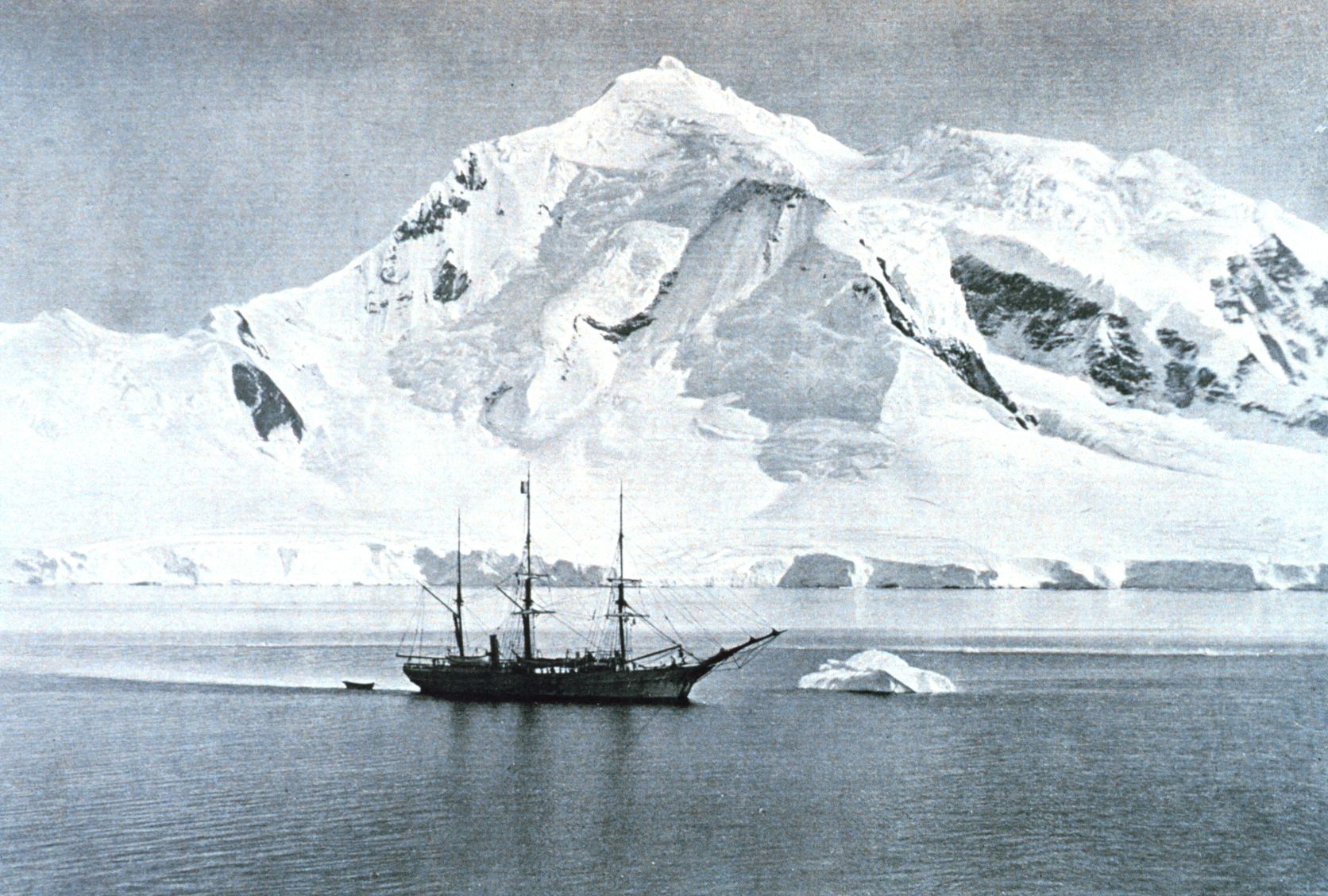
- RV Belgica anchored at Mount William circa 1898.

Highest point
- Elevation: 1,520 m (4,990 ft)
- Prominence: 1,017 m (3,337 ft)
- Listing: Ribu
- Coordinates: 64°47′S 63°41′W

Geography
- Location: Anvers Island, Antarctica

Mount William is a prominent snowy mountain in Antarctica, standing 1,520 metres (4,990 ft) tall, and located 6 kilometres (3.7 mi) north-northeast of Cape Lancaster which is the south extremity of Anvers Island, in the Palmer Archipelago. This is the tallest mountain visible from Biscoe Bay, near the south end of the island's Osterrieth Range which also includes Mount Français (the tallest mountain on the island).

This mountain was discovered on February 21, 1832, by John Biscoe who incorrectly believed it to be part of the mainland of Antarctic Peninsula, instead of on an island. He named it for William IV, then King of the United Kingdom.

Mountain climbers from the U.K. were the first to ascend this peak, in 1956. In 2003, after climbing this mountain, two Americans skied down.

A rock ridge leading northwest from Mount William leads to Shewry Peak.
