= Shewry Peak =

Mountain in Antarctica

- Location within Antarctica

Highest point
- Elevation: 1,065 metres (3,494 ft)
- Coordinates: 64°45′S 63°38′W

Geography
- Location: Antarctica

Shewry Peak is a peak marking the end of the rock ridge which extends northward from Mount William in the south part of Anvers Island, in the Palmer Archipelago. It was surveyed from the east by the Falkland Islands Dependencies Survey (FIDS) in 1944 and resurveyed and photographed in 1955. It was named by the United Kingdom Antarctic Place-Names Committee (UK-APC) for Arthur L. Shewry of FIDS, general assistant at the Arthur Harbor station in 1955.
