= William S. Fellers =

United States Marine Corps general

William Stanley Fellers
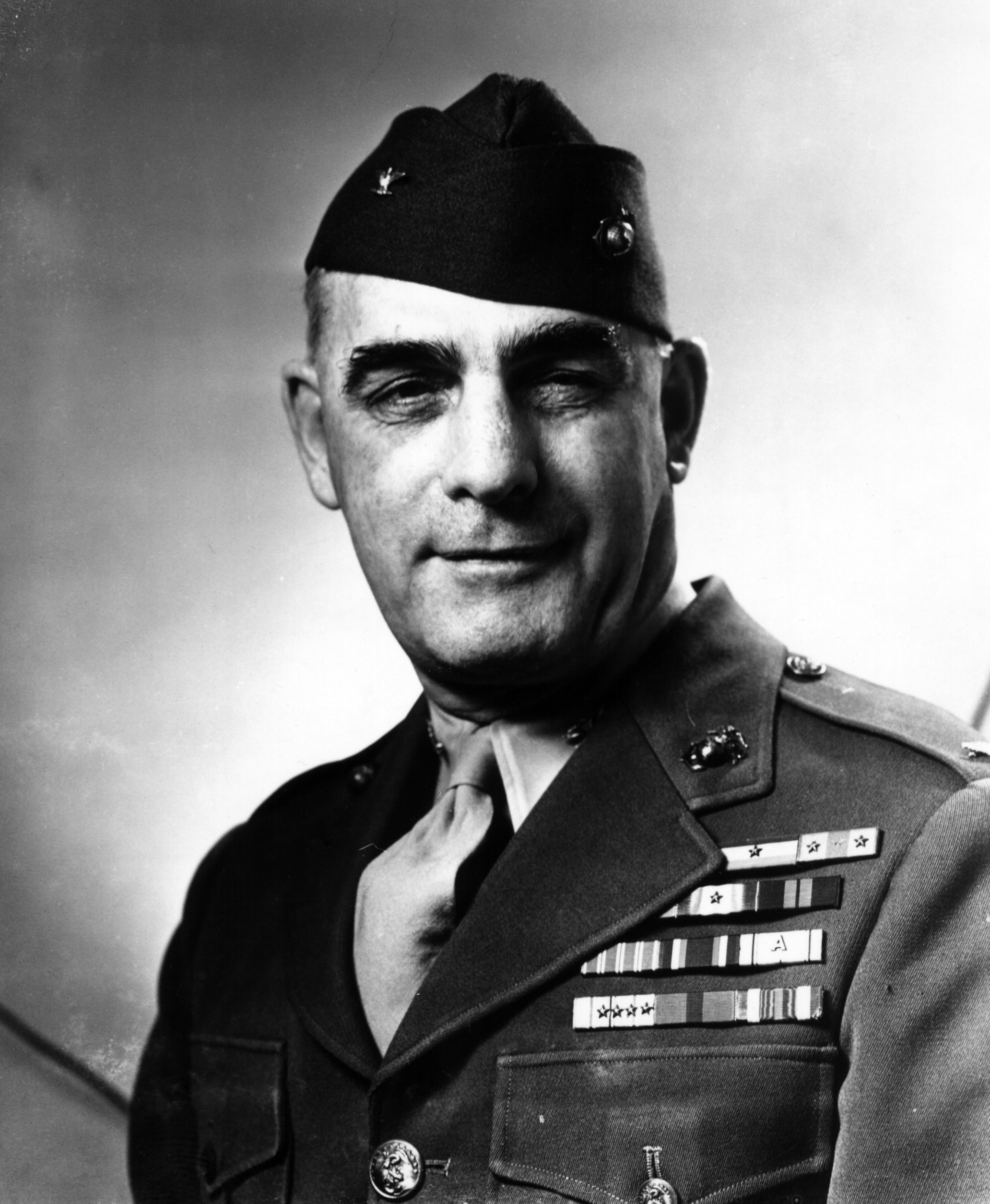
- Fellers as colonel, USMC
- Born: December 16, 1895; Cincinnati, Ohio, U.S.
- Died: November 24, 1973 (aged 77); Rome, Georgia, U.S.
- Military career
- Allegiance: United States
- Branch: United States Marine Corps
- Service years: 1917–1954
- Rank: Major general
- Service number: 0-285
- Commands: 5th Marine Regiment; XO of the 5th Marine Regiment; S-4 of 1st Marine Division; Troop Training Unit, Naval Amphibious Base Coronado
- Conflicts: World War I Haitian Campaign; Yangtze Patrol; Nicaraguan Campaign; World War II: Battle of Guadalcanal; Solomon Islands campaign; New Guinea campaign; New Britain campaign; Battle of Cape Gloucester; Korean War
- Awards: Legion of Merit (2)

William Stanley Fellers (December 16, 1895 – November 24, 1973) was a decorated officer of the United States Marine Corps with the rank of major general. He is most noted as Director of the Staff of the Inter-American Defense Board or as Supply officer of the 1st Marine Division during World War II.

== World War II ==
Fellers was subsequently appointed commanding officer of the 1st Battalion, 2nd Marines and served in this capacity until June 1942, when he was reassigned as executive officer of the 2nd Marine Regiment. Lieutenant Colonel Fellers served in this capacity until October 1942, when he was appointed executive officer of the 5th Marine Regiment. While served in this capacity, he was responsible for establishing of the Supply base at Espiritu Santo, from where Marine units on Guadalcanal were supplied. Fellers was later decorated with the Legion of Merit with Combat "V" for his efforts during Guadalcanal Campaign.

He was promoted to the rank of colonel in May 1943 and appointed assistant chief of staff and supply officer of 1st Marine Division. Fellers served in this capacity during New Britain campaign under Major General William H. Rupertus, and, following the Battle of Cape Gloucester, he received his second Legion of Merit.

On 21 May 1944, Fellers was transferred back to 5th Marine Regiment and succeeded temporary commanding officer, Lieutenant Colonel Henry W. Buse. Colonel Fellers supervised the training and preparation of the regiment for Peleliu operation; however, the division assistant commander, Brigadier General Oliver P. Smith (who personally served as 5th Marines Commander until 9 April 1944), was not satisfied with the way Fellers led the training of the regiment and how he treated the junior officers. Everything escalated after the complaint made by 5th Marines executive officer, Lieutenant Colonel Lewis William Walt, to Colonel John T. Selden. Selden, who served as 1st Marine Division Chief of Staff and was Walt's close friend, got a report that officers within the regiment were losing confidence in Colonel Fellers. The unofficial complaint was forwarded to General Smith, who decided to focus more on Fellers.

General Smith later came to conclusion that it would be in the best interest of the 5th Marine regiment to relieve Colonel Fellers. Smith asked for that division commander, Major General Rupertus, who relieved Fellers under rotation policy on 17 August 1944. Fellers was finally relieved by Colonel Harold D. Harris and sent home.

Upon his return to the United States, Colonel Fellers was assigned to the Headquarters Marine Corps in Washington, D.C., and appointed officer in charge of the Rehabilitation Division, Personnel Department. He was later appointed officer in charge of the Procurement Division and served in this capacity for the duration of the War.

== Later service ==
Fellers served in this capacity until April 1946, when he was transferred to Okinawa, where he was appointed commanding officer of Marine barracks within Naval Base Okinawa. His tour of duty ended in May 1947, when he was appointed commander of Marine barracks within United States Fleet Activities Yokosuka.

He returned to the United States at the beginning of July 1948, when he was appointed chief of staff, troop training unit at Naval Amphibious Base Coronado under Major General John T. Walker. Fellers has been promoted to the rank of brigadier general in July 1949 and relieved Walker at the same time.

In January 1950, Supreme Commander for the Allied Powers, General Douglas MacArthur, requested amphibious training for occupation troops in Japan under his command. Fellers sent Colonel Edward H. Forney and Mobile Training Team Able from his troop training unit to Japan at MacArthur's request. During the following months, Fellers traveled to Japan for inspection tours of his unit and later participated in the planning of the Inchon landing on the staff of Commander of the Naval Amphibious Command, Vice admiral James H. Doyle.

Fellers returned to the United States in August 1950 and was succeeded by Major General John T. Selden. He was subsequently assigned to Camp Lejeune, North Carolina, as deputy commander. Fellers served in this capacity until June 1953, when he was appointed Director of the Staff of the Inter-American Defense Board. He finally retired from the Marine Corps on June 30, 1954, and was advanced to the rank of major general on the retired list for having been specially commended in combat.

== Life in retirement ==
Upon retirement from the Marine Corps, Fellers resided in Rome, Georgia, where he was active in Rome Rotary Club and also as communicant of St. Peter's Episcopal Church. He and his wife Ellison Bedell Fellers had together one daughter, Peggy Fellers (1923–1968), and one son, William S. Fellers Jr. (1927–2001), who also served with the Marine Corps and retired as master sergeant.

Fellers died on November 24, 1973.

== Decorations ==
Here is the ribbon bar of Major General William S. Fellers:

1st row	Legion of Merit with Combat "V" and one 5/16" gold star		Navy Presidential Unit Citation with one star	
2nd row	Navy Unit Commendation	Marine Corps Good Conduct Medal	Marine Corps Expeditionary Medal with two stars	World War I Victory Medal with West Indies Clasp
3rd row	Haitian Campaign Medal	Second Nicaraguan Campaign Medal	Yangtze Service Medal	American Defense Service Medal with "A" Device
4th row	Asiatic-Pacific Campaign Medal with four 3/16 inch service stars	American Campaign Medal	World War II Victory Medal	Navy Occupation Service Medal
5th row	National Defense Service Medal	Korean Service Medal	Nicaraguan Cross of Valor and Diploma	United Nations Korea Medal

Military offices
Preceded by Henry W. Buse Jr.	Commanding Officer of the 5th Marine Regiment; 21 May 1944 – 17 August 1944	Succeeded by Harold D. Harris
