= Jake Findlay =

Scottish footballer (1954–2025)

Personal information
- Full name: John Williamson Findlay
- Date of birth: 13 July 1954
- Place of birth: Blairgowrie, Scotland
- Date of death: 3 May 2025 (aged 70)
- Position: Goalkeeper

Youth career
- 1968–1975: Aston Villa

Senior career*
Years	Team	Apps	(Gls)
1975–1977	Aston Villa	14	(0)
1977–1985	Luton Town	167	(0)
1983	→ Barnsley (loan)	6	(0)
1983	→ Derby County (loan)	1	(0)
1985	Swindon Town	4	(0)
1985	Portsmouth	0	(0)
1986	Peterborough		
1986–1987	Coventry City	0	(0)
Total		192	(0)
- * Club domestic league appearances and goals

John Williamson "Jake" Findlay (13 July 1954 – 3 May 2025) was a Scottish footballer who played as a goalkeeper, notably for Aston Villa and Luton Town.

== Career ==
Born in Blairgowrie, Findlay was signed by Aston Villa a month before his 15th birthday.

Only making 14 appearances for Villa, he was sold to David Pleat's Luton Town in 1977 as a replacement for Milija Aleksic. He starred for Luton as they won the Second Division in 1981–82.

Findlay was constantly tipped to play for Scotland, but was never called up. Findlay fractured his thumb in 1983, and by the time he had recovered, Luton had signed Les Sealey. Findlay moved on to Swindon Town in 1985, and after spells with Portsmouth, Peterborough, and Coventry, he retired in 1987.

== Personal life and death ==
Findlay was a supporter of Rushall Olympic. He died on 3 May 2025, at the age of 70.
