= Palindrome Buttress =

Rock formation on Alexander Island, Antarctica

Palindrome Buttress (71°6′S 70°27′W) is a conspicuous rock buttress, rising to about 905 m, marking the southern extremity of the north group of the Walton Mountains, in central Alexander Island, Antarctica. The buttress was first sighted from the air by Lincoln Ellsworth on November 23, 1935, and roughly mapped from photos obtained on that flight by W.L.G. Joerg. Remapped in greater detail from air photos taken by the Ronne Antarctic Research Expedition (RARE), 1947–48, by Searle of the Falkland Islands Dependencies Survey (FIDS) in 1960. So named by the United Kingdom Antarctic Place-Names Committee because the characteristic shape of the buttress is recognizable at a considerable distance from all quarters.
