= Biscoe (surname) =

Biscoe is a surname. Notable people with the surname include:

- Bert Biscoe, Cornish bard
- Charles Biscoe (1875–1948), British fencer
- Chris Biscoe (1947 - ), English jazz multi-instrumentalist
- Donna Biscoe (born 1955), American actress
- John Biscoe (1794 - 1843), nineteenth-century English explorer
- John Biscoe (MP) (1613–1672), English politician and colonel in the New Model Army
- Maurice B. Biscoe (1871–1953), American architect
- Patsy Biscoe (1946 - ), Australian singer
- Richard Biscoe (died 1748), English clergyman and dissenting minister

== See also ==
- Alec Julian Tyndale-Biscoe (1906–1997), Rear Admiral and naval engineer
- Cecil Tyndale-Biscoe (1863–1949), British missionary and educationist
