= Börgen Bay =

Bay in Antarctica

Börgen Bay (64°45′S 63°30′W) is a bay 4 nautical miles (7 km) wide, indenting the southeast coast of Anvers Island in the Palmer Archipelago of Antarctica. Canty Point marks the west side of the entrance to Börgen Bay, while Bay Point marks the east entrance. Billie Peak stands 1.5 nautical miles (3 km) east-northeast of Bay Point.

The bay and its headlands were first charted by the Belgian Antarctic Expedition, 1897–99. The bay was named by the expedition's leader, Adrien de Gerlache, for Karl Börgen, the German astronomer. Canty Point was later surveyed by the Falkland Islands Dependencies Survey (FIDS) in 1955. It was named by the UK Antarctic Place-Names Committee for John Canty of FIDS, radio operator/mechanic at the Arthur Harbour station in 1955 and a member of the sledging party which visited the point. Bay Point is first named on a chart based on a 1927 Discovery Investigations survey, but may reflect an earlier naming.

Both Hooper Glacier and William Glacier flow into the bay from inland. Gateway Ridge separates them from one another.
