= Lundström Knoll =

Rock knoll in the Shackleton Range, Antarctica

Lundström Knoll (80°31′S 20°25′W) is a rock knoll rising to about 1,400 metres (4,600 ft) to the northeast of the Chevreul Cliffs in Pioneers Escarpment, Shackleton Range, Antarctica. It was photographed from the air by the U.S. Navy, 1967, and surveyed by the British Antarctic Survey, 1968–71. The knoll was named by the UK Antarctic Place-Names Committee in association with the names of pioneers of polar life and travel grouped in this area, after Johan E. Lundström, the Swedish inventor of the first true "strike-on-box safety match" in 1855.
