= Biscoe, Virginia =

Unincorporated community in Virginia, United States

- Unincorporated community
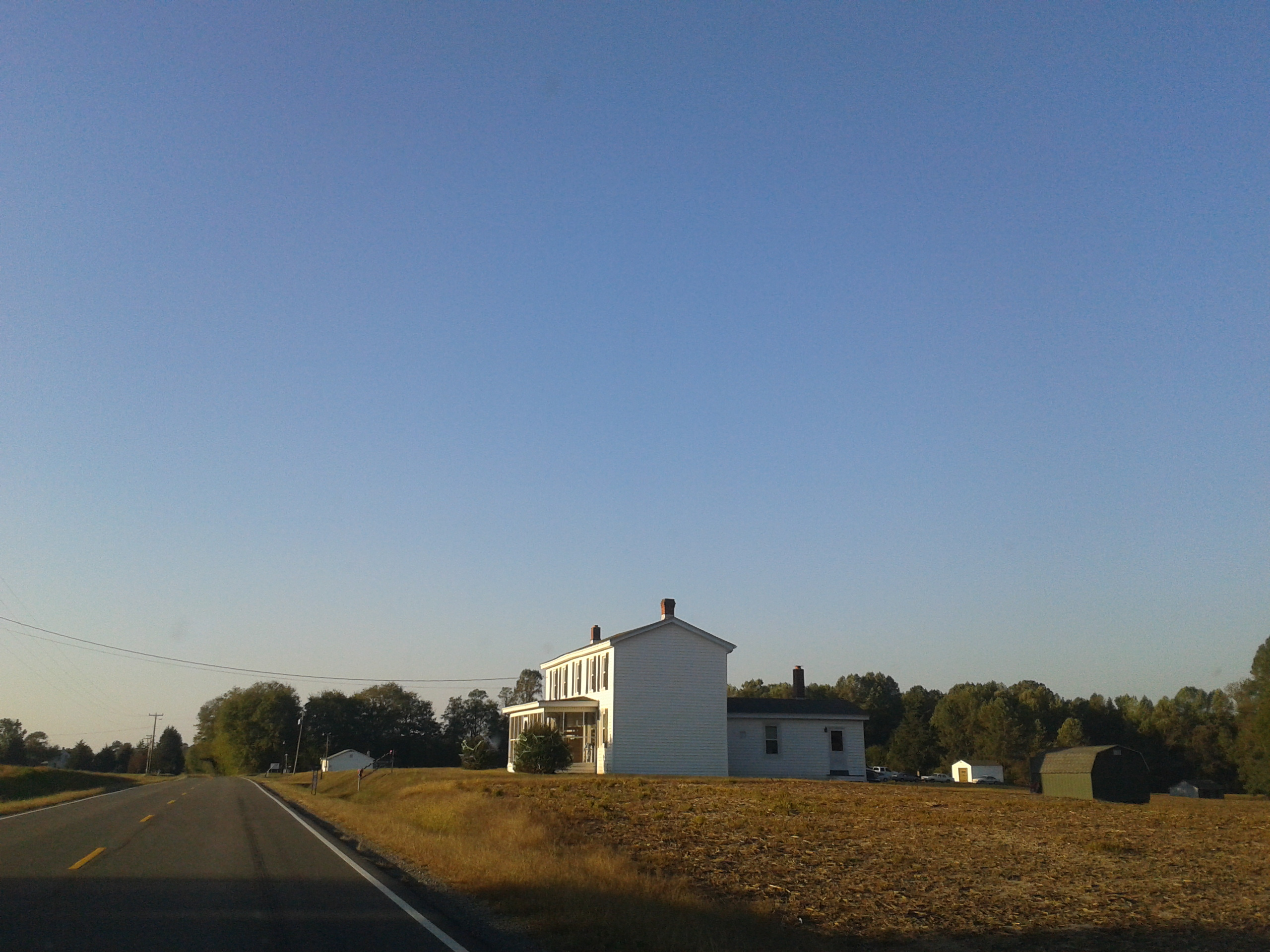
- Biscoe near dusk, October, 2016

- Location in Virginia, United States Biscoe (the United States)
- Coordinates: 37°49′5″N 77°3′28″W
- Country: United States
- State: Virginia
- County: King and Queen County

Biscoe is an unincorporated community in King and Queen County, Virginia, United States.
