= RRS John Biscoe =

RRS John Biscoe may refer to the following British survey ships:

- RRS John Biscoe (1944), in use 1944–1982
- RRS John Biscoe (1956), decommissioned in 1991. During her maiden voyage in the 1956/57 season, the vessel carried Prince Philip, the Duke of Edinburgh, who used the ship to visit several research stations in the Falkland Islands Dependencies.
