= Taylor Buttresses =

Taylor Buttresses (70°8′S 67°23′W) is an oval shaped, whale-back shaped hill with its smooth contours broken at the northern end by three rock buttresses which are conspicuous from the north, located near the heads of Riley Glacier and Chapman Glacier in western Palmer Land. Named by UK Antarctic Place-Names Committee (UK-APC) for Brian J. Taylor, British Antarctic Survey (BAS) geologist at Fossil Bluff station, 1961–63.
