= Access Point (Antarctica) =

Coordinates: 64°50′S 63°47′W

Access Point is a rocky point immediately southeast of Biscoe Point and 2 miles (3 km) northwest of Cape Lancaster on the south side of Anvers Island, in the Palmer Archipelago. First charted by the French Antarctic Expedition under Jean-Baptiste Charcot, 1903–05. Surveyed in 1955 by the Falkland Islands Dependencies Survey (FIDS) and so named because there is a landing place for boats on the northwest tip of the point which provides access to the inland parts of the island.
