= Sumgin Buttress =

Sumgin Buttress (80°18′S 25°44′W) is a prominent elevated rock mass 2.5 nautical miles (4.6 km) southwest of Charpentier Pyramid, rising to about 1,100 m on the west side of Herbert Mountains, Shackleton Range. It was roughly surveyed by the Commonwealth Trans-Antarctic Expedition of 1957 and was photographed from the air by the U.S. Navy in 1967. It was resurveyed by the British Antarctic Survey (BAS) between 1968 and 1971. In association with the names of glacial geologists grouped in this area, it was named by the United Kingdom Antarctic Place-Names Committee (UK-APC) in 1971 after Mikhail Ivanovich Sumgin (1873–1942), a Russian pioneer in permafrost research.
