= Buchia Buttress =

Buchia Buttress (67°17′S 68°13′W) is a rock buttress at the southwest end of Mount Bouvier on eastern Adelaide Island. This geological locality was investigated by the British Antarctic Survey, 1980–81, and found to contain marine fossils, including a bivalve species of the genus Buchia. The buttress was so was named by the UK Antarctic Place-Names Committee in 1982.
