= Peter R. Hooper =

Peter R. Hooper (1931 - April 21, 2012) was a British geologist, author, and professor in the Department of Geology at Washington State University. He was best known for his research on the Columbia River Flood Basalt Province (CRFBP).

== Hooper Glacier ==
Hooper Glacier is a glacier in the Palmer Archipelago, Antarctica. It was named after Peter R. Hooper by the UK Antarctic Place-Names Committee.

== Notable works ==
Petrology and Chemistry of the Rock Creek Flow, Columbia River Basalt, Idaho
