= William Glacier =

Glacier in Antarctica

- Location within Antarctica
- Location: Palmer Archipelago
- Coordinates: 64°43′S 63°27′W
- Thickness: unknown
- Status: unknown

William Glacier (64°43′S 63°27′W) is a glacier flowing south from the interior highlands of Anvers Island to the head of Börgen Bay on the southeast coast of the island, in the Palmer Archipelago. Discovered by the Belgian Antarctic Expedition, 1897–99, under Gerlache, and charted by them simply as a "grand glacier." The name William Glacier first appears on a chart based upon a 1927 survey by DI personnel on the Discovery. Gateway Ridge separates William Glacier from Hooper Glacier.

== See also ==
- List of glaciers in the Antarctic
- Glaciology
