= William Buttress =

English cricketer

- Born: 25 November 1827; Cambridge, England
- Died: 25 August 1866 (aged 38); Cambridge, England
- Spouse: Sarah Mott (m. 1848)
- Children: 4
- Cricket career

Cricket information
- Batting: Right-handed
- Bowling: Right-arm slow medium

Domestic team information
- Years: Team
- 1849–61: Cambridgeshire; Suffolk; Norfolk; Huntingdonshire; Leicestershire; Devon; Dorset; Cheshire; Bedfordshire; Shrewsbury
- 1852-53: Shropshire

William Buttress (25 November 1827 – 25 August 1866) was an English first-class cricketer active 1849–61 who played for Cambridge Town Club (aka Cambridgeshire) as a right-arm slow medium pace bowler.

== Cricket ==
In 17 first-class matches, he took 83 wickets with a best return of seven for 35. He achieved five wickets in an innings nine times and ten in a match twice. He batted right-handed as a tailender and held eleven catches as a fielder.

He played county cricket for Cambridgeshire, Suffolk, Norfolk, Huntingdonshire, Leicestershire, Devon, Dorset, Cheshire, Bedfordshire and (in 1852–53) Shropshire while being professional at Shrewsbury Cricket Club.

== Personal life ==
Buttress married Sarah Mott, a laundress, in Cambridge on 25 June 1848. The pair went on to have four children. Researcher Willie Sugg indicates that he was a keen practical joker, and that he struggled financially later for long periods of his career, being apparently assisted by John Walker (a former Cambridge University cricketer).

Buttress was born in Cambridge and died there aged 38, due to tuberculosis.
