= David Hughes (footballer, born 1958) =

English footballer (1958–2023)

Personal information
- Full name: David Thomas Hughes
- Date of birth: 19 March 1958
- Place of birth: Birmingham, England
- Date of death: September 2023 (aged 65)
- Position: Midfielder

Youth career
- 1974–1976: Aston Villa

Senior career*
Years	Team	Apps	(Gls)
1976–1977	Aston Villa	4	(1)
1977–1981	Lincoln City	62	(1)
1981–1982	Scunthorpe United	21	(0)
1982–1985	Worcester City	94	(7)
- * Club domestic league appearances and goals

David Thomas Hughes (19 March 1958 – September 2023) was an English footballer who made 87 appearances in the Football League playing for Aston Villa, Lincoln City and Scunthorpe United, before moving into non-league football with Worcester City. He played as a midfielder. Hughes died in September 2023, at the age of 65.

== Early life and career ==
Hughes was born in Birmingham on 19 March 1985. After joining Villa as an apprentice in July 1974, Hughes graduated from the youth team to play his first game for the reserves against Derby County in December that year.

Later on in Hughes' career, he spent the 1981/82 campaign with Scunthorpe United and finished his career with three years of non-League football for Worcester City.
