= Henriksen Buttress =

Henriksen Buttress (54°23′S 36°33′W) is a prominent rock buttress, 1,970 metres (6,460 ft) high, standing 2 nautical miles (4 km) southeast of Mount Sugartop in the central part of the Allardyce Range of South Georgia. It was surveyed by the South Georgia Survey in the period 1951–57, and was named by the UK Antarctic Place-Names Committee for Henrik N. Henriksen who, in 1909, built the South Georgia Whaling Company station at Leith Harbour, and was manager there from 1909 until 1920.
