= Biscoe Point =

Coordinates: 64°49′6.85″S 63°46′32.29″W

Biscoe Point is a rocky point forming the south-eastern side of Biscoe Bay, immediately north of Access Point on the south side of Anvers Island, in the Palmer Archipelago of Antarctica.

== History ==
The French Antarctic Expedition under Jean-Baptiste Charcot roughly surveyed the south-west coast of Anvers Island in 1904. They gave the name "Presqu'ile de Biscoe" to a small peninsula on the south-eastern side of Biscoe Bay, honouring John Biscoe who may have landed in the vicinity in 1832. When the coast was resurveyed by the Falkland Islands Dependencies Survey in 1955, two rocky points were found in approximately that location; the name Biscoe Point was applied to the more prominent of the two.

== Antarctic Specially Protected Area ==
A 63 ha site at the point has been designated an Antarctic Specially Protected Area (ASPA 139) for its biological values. It contains significant stands of the continent's two flowering plant species, Antarctic hair grass and Antarctic pearlwort, with several species of mosses and lichens. There are also colonies of Adélie and gentoo penguins.
