= Charpentier Pyramid =

Mountain peak in Antarctica

Charpentier Pyramid (80°16′S 25°37′W) is a pyramid-shaped peak rising to 1,080 metres (3,540 ft) in the northwest part of the Herbert Mountains, Shackleton Range. In association with the names of glacial geologists grouped in this area, it was named by the UK Antarctic Place-Names Committee in 1971 after Jean de Charpentier, a Swiss engineer and mineralogist who in 1835 gave additional proof on the former extension of glaciers.
