= Copper Peak (Antarctica) =

Mountain in Antarctica

Copper Peak (64°43′00″S 063°21′00″W) is a peak, 1,125 metres (3,691 ft) high and vivid green in color, standing 2 nautical miles (3.7 km) north-northeast of Billie Peak on the southeast side of Anvers Island, in the Palmer Archipelago off the Antarctic Peninsula.

It was first seen by the Belgian Antarctic Expedition of 1897–1899 under Adrien de Gerlache. The descriptive name appears on a chart based on a 1927 survey by Discovery Investigations personnel on the RRS Discovery.
