= Mount Rennie =

Mountain in Antarctica

Mount Rennie (64°41′S 63°35′W) is a snow-covered mountain, 1,555 m, forming the central part of the ridge which extends southwestward from Mount Francais, in the south part of Anvers Island in the Palmer Archipelago. Roughly surveyed by the Falkland Islands Dependencies Survey (FIDS) in 1944 and resurveyed by them in 1955. Named by the United Kingdom Antarctic Place-Names Committee (UK-APC) for Alexander J. Rennie of FIDS, assistant surveyor at the Arthur Harbor station in 1955.
