= Mike Buttress =

English footballer

Personal information
- Date of birth: 5 March 1958 (age 68)
- Place of birth: Peterborough, England
- Position: Defender

Senior career*
| Years | Team | Apps | (Gls) |
| 1976–1978 | Aston Villa | 3 | (0) |
| 1978 | Gillingham | 7 | (0) |
- Telford United
| Total | | 10 | (0) |
- * Club domestic league appearances and goals

Mike Buttress (born 5 March 1958) is an English former footballer who played in the Football League for Aston Villa and Gillingham.
