= Biscoe Bay =

Bay in Antarctica

Coordinates: 64°48′0″S 63°50′0″W

Biscoe Bay is a bay which indents the southwest coast of Anvers Island immediately north of Biscoe Point, in the Palmer Archipelago, Antarctica. First charted by the Belgian Antarctic Expedition, 1897–99, under Adrien de Gerlache, and named by him for John Biscoe, who may have landed there in February 1832.
