= Billie Peak =

Peak on Anvers Island, Palmer Archipelago, Antarctica

Billie Peak (64°45′S 63°23′W) is a peak, 725 metres (2,380 ft) high, which rises 1.5 nautical miles (3 km) east-northeast of Bay Point on the southeast coast of Anvers Island, in the Palmer Archipelago. It was discovered by the Belgian Antarctic Expedition, 1897–99, under Gerlache. The name appears on a chart based on a 1927 Discovery Investigations survey, but may reflect an earlier naming.
