= Cape Lancaster =

Cape in the Palmer Archipelago, Antarctica

Cape Lancaster (64°51′S 63°44′W) is a cape forming the southern extremity of Anvers Island, in the Palmer Archipelago, Antarctica. It was discovered by a German expedition under Eduard Dallmann, 1873–1874. The cape was later sighted by the Belgian Antarctic Expedition, 1897–1899, under Gerlache, who named it for Albert Lancaster, Scientific Director of the Meteorological Service of the Royal Observatory of Belgium and a supporter of the expedition.
