= Phils Island =

Island in Palmer Archipelago, Antarctica

- Location within Antarctica

Geography
- Location: Antarctica
- Coordinates: 64°30′S 63°0′W

Administration
- Administered under the Antarctic Treaty System

Demographics
- Population: Uninhabited

Phils Island is the southern of two small islands lying immediately south of Guepratte Island in Discovery Sound, in the Palmer Archipelago. Charted and named in 1927 by DI personnel on the Discovery.

== See also ==
- List of Antarctic and sub-Antarctic islands
