= Chilean transport Piloto Pardo =

Chilean Navy auxiliary ship from 1959 until 1997

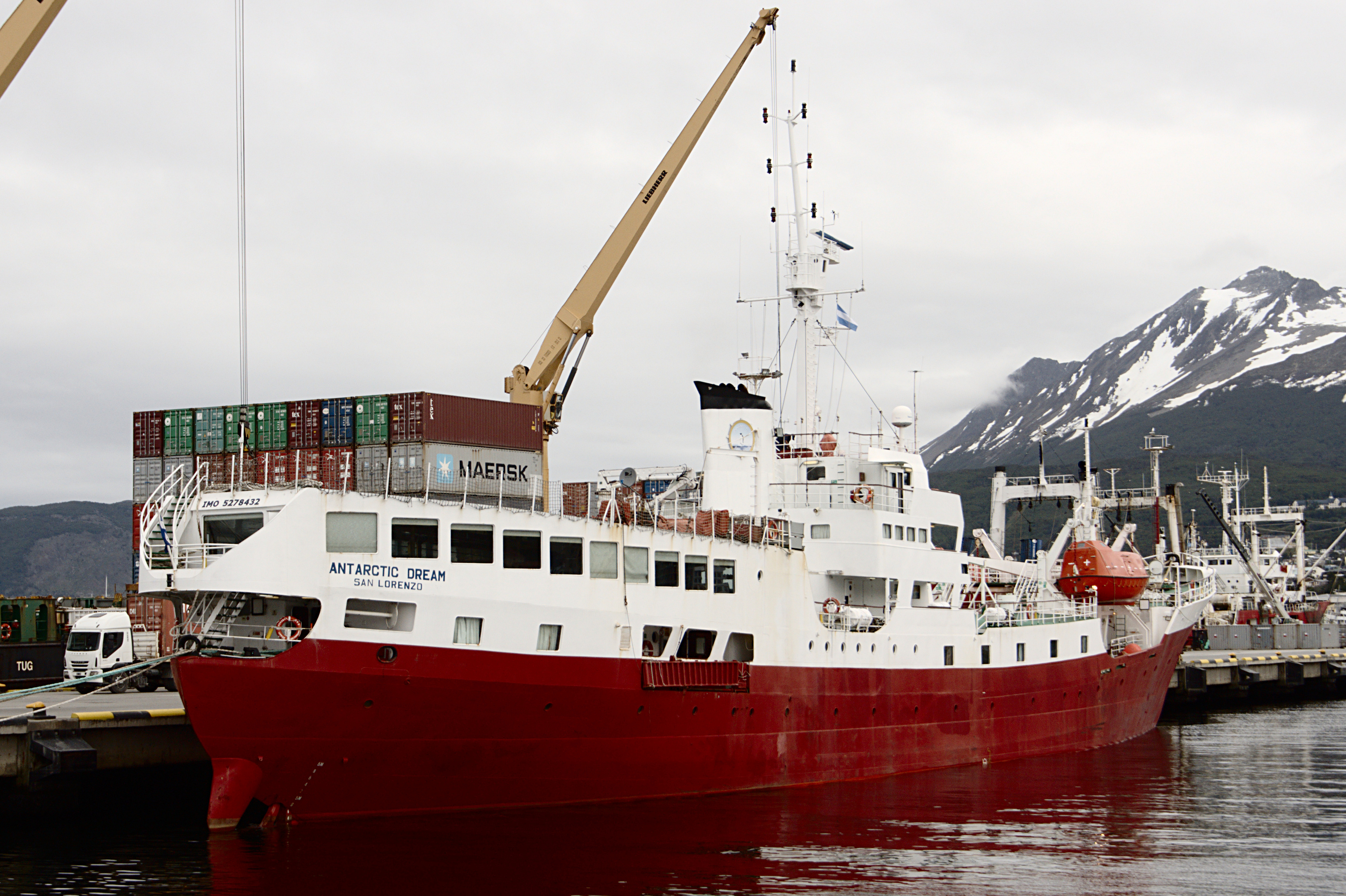
- MV Antarctic Dream in the port of Ushuaia (2013)

History

Chile
- Name: Piloto Pardo (AP-45)
- Namesake: Luis Pardo
- Builder: Haarlemsche Scheepsbouw Maatschappij, Haarlem, Netherlands
- Launched: 11 June 1958
- Commissioned: 7 April 1959
- Decommissioned: January 1997
- Fate: Sold into commercial service, 1998
- Name: Hotu Matua (1998-2003); Antarctic Dream (2003-2012)
- Owner: Orlando Paoa, Easter Island, (1998-2003); Antarctic Shipping SA, Chile (2003-2012)
- Identification: IMO number: 5278432; Call sign: HQXJ2; MMSI number: 334984000
- Status: In service

General characteristics
- Type: Polar cruise ship
- Tonnage: 2,180 GRT
- Length: 83 m (272 ft 4 in) o/a
- Beam: 11.9 m (39 ft 1 in)
- Draught: 4.6 m (15 ft 1 in)
- Ice class: 1A
- Propulsion: Diesel-electric, 1,850 kW (2,481 hp)
- Speed: 12 knots (22 km/h; 14 mph)
- Capacity: 80 passengers
- Crew: 43
- Aviation facilities: Helipad

Piloto Pardo was a Chilean Navy auxiliary ship from 1959 until 1997. After decommissioning she was converted to an Antarctic expedition cruise ship and operated as such until 2012 under the name MV Antarctic Dream.

== Ship history ==
The vessel was built for the Chilean Navy by the Haarlemsche Scheepsbouw Maatschappij ("Haarlem Shipbuilding Company") of Haarlem, Netherlands, launched on 11 June 1958, and commissioned on 7 April 1959. She was constructed specifically for servicing the scientific bases established in the Chilean Antarctic Territory. The ship measures 83 meters overall length and 11.9 meters wide, with a gross tonnage of over 2,000 metric tons and a draught of 4.60 meters, with an ice-strengthened hull for polar navigation. The ship was christened Piloto Pardo, after Luis Pardo, the captain of the cutter Yelcho, which rescued the stranded men of Sir Ernest Shackleton's Endurance Expedition from Elephant Island, Antarctica, in August 1916.

She was decommissioned in January 1997.

In 1998 she was sold to Orlando Paoa of Easter Island, and renamed Hoto Matua. In 2003 she was sold to Antarctic Shipping SA and converted into an Antarctic cruise ship in the Astilleros y Maestranzas de la Armada Chilena (ASMAR) shipyard, and renamed Antarctic Dream. The refurbishing allowed a capacity of 80 passengers; 40 double cabins, all with exterior views.

On 4 December 2008, the ship MV Ushuaia grounded at position 64°35.5'S 62°25'W, at the entrance of Wilhelmina Bay, near Cape Anna. The Antarctic Dream was the first vessel on the scene to assist passengers. Other vessels to assist were the National Geographic Explorer, Professor Multanovskiy and Polar Star.

Antarctic Shipping SA suspended operations in July 2012.

The boat complies with MARPOL and is ISM and ISPS certified. Antarctic Shipping SA was a member of the International Association of Antarctic Tour Operators (IAATO).

The ship was operated by Oceanwide Expeditions in Arctic waters, and by tour operators Adventure Smith Explorations, Adventure Life, Southern Explorations, Explore! in Antarctica.

Since 2019 the ship was used as a sleeping and working place for UN personal during the UNMHA mission in Yemen, stationed in the harbor of Hodeida. In May 2020 the Antarctic Dream left Hodeida in regard of the security situation, heading towards Amman (Jordania).
