= RRS Discovery =

Wooden barque museum ship built (1901) for Antarctic research

Coordinates: 56°27′25″N 2°58′0″W

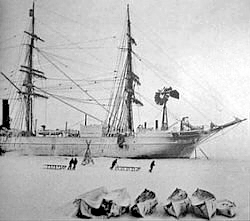
- RRS Discovery in Antarctica c. 1902

History

United Kingdom
- Owner: Dundee Heritage Trust (since 1985)
- Builder: Dundee Shipbuilders Company, Dundee
- Yard number: 133
- Laid down: 1900
- Launched: 21 March 1901
- Sponsored by: Lady Markham
- Christened: Lady Markham
- Status: Museum ship in Dundee, Scotland

General characteristics
- Class & type: Wooden barque; 1 funnel, 3 masts
- Tonnage: 736 GRT
- Displacement: 1,570 tonnes
- Length: 172 ft (52 m)
- Beam: 33 ft (10 m)
- Propulsion: Coal-fired 450 hp (340 kW) steam engine and sail
- Speed: 8 knots (15 km/h)
- Crew: 11 officers and 36 men

RRS Discovery is a barque-rigged auxiliary steamship built in Dundee, Scotland, for Antarctic research. Launched in 1901, she was the last traditional wooden three-masted ship to be built in the United Kingdom. Her first mission was the British National Antarctic Expedition, carrying Robert Falcon Scott and Ernest Shackleton on their first, and highly successful, journey to the Antarctic, known as the Discovery Expedition.

After service as a merchant ship before and during the First World War, Discovery was taken into the service of the British government in 1923 to carry out scientific research in the Southern Ocean, becoming the first Royal Research Ship. The ship undertook a two-year expedition – the Discovery Investigations – recording valuable information on the oceans, marine life and being the first scientific investigation into whale populations. From 1929 to 1931 Discovery served as the base for the British Australian and New Zealand Antarctic Research Expedition (BANZARE) under Douglas Mawson. This was a major scientific and territorial quest in what is now the Australian Antarctic Territory.

On her return from the BANZARE, Discovery was moored in London as a static training ship and visitor attraction until 1979. That year she was placed in the care of the Maritime Trust as a museum ship. In 1986 she was moved to Dundee, the city where she was built. After an extensive restoration, Discovery is now the centrepiece of a visitor attraction in the city. She is one of only two surviving expedition ships from the Heroic Age of Antarctic Exploration, the other being the Norwegian ship Fram.

== Design and construction ==
With increasing scientific and political attention being turned to the uncharted continent of Antarctica during the late 19th century, numerous proposals arose for a British-mounted expedition to the continent. The Royal Navy had been something of a pioneer with Antarctic exploration, mounting the Ross expedition in 1839 which discovered the Ross Ice Shelf. Attention had turned northward to the Arctic and attempts to reach the North Pole. The RN mounted the British Arctic Expedition in 1874.

Towards the turn of the century, there was increasing pressure for a similar expedition to the southern polar region. The British government and the Admiralty stopped short of organising a government expedition but agreed to partially fund a project led by the two main interested scientific organisations, the Royal Geographical Society and the Royal Society. The Admiralty would provide practical support in designing and crewing a purpose-built ship for the expedition, while the ship would be owned by the RGS.

Early discussions on building a dedicated polar exploration ship considered replicating Fridtjof Nansen's ship Fram, but that vessel was designed specifically for working through the pack ice of the Arctic. The British ship would have to cross thousands of miles of open ocean before reaching the Antarctic, so a more conventional design was chosen. In charge of her overall design was W.E. Smith, one of the senior naval architects at the Admiralty. The ship's engine, boilers and other machinery were designed by Fleet Engineer Philip Marrack.

Smith borrowed many elements of his design from the Bloodhound, a Dundee-built whaling ship taken into Royal Navy service as HMS Discovery for the Arctic Expedition. By 1900 few shipyards in the United Kingdom had the capability to build wooden ships of the size needed – only two shipbuilders submitted bids for the contract. The designers deemed it essential that the ship be made from wood, both for strength and ease of repair, and to reduce magnetic interference from a steel hull. They wanted to gain the most accurate navigation and surveying.

The main compass was mounted perfectly amidships, and there were to be no steel or iron fittings within 30 ft (9.1 m) of this point. The original cushions for the wardroom (just aft and below the main bridge) were changed when it was found they included steel-backed buttons. Similarly some of the wardroom cabins fell within this area, and their occupants had to sleep on mattresses stuffed with horsehair. Others located at a distance had more modern types of mattresses with steel springs inside. For the same reason of navigation, the boilers and engine were mounted towards the stern of the ship, a feature which also provided maximum space for equipment and provisions. A special laboratory for taking magnetic field measurements was provided below the bridge.

The ship committee considered having the ship built in Norway by Framnæs, the yard which would later build Endurance. But supporters believed that the British government's money should be spent at a British yard. The new Discovery was built by the Dundee Shipbuilders Company, which primarily made smaller vessels such as trawlers, tugboats and steam yachts. The yard was previously owned by Alexander Stephen and Sons and had built the Terra Nova, purchased by Scott for his last expedition, in 1884. The committee responsible for the ship's construction offered a separate tender for her boilers, engine and auxiliary machinery in an effort to reduce costs. Dundee Shipbuilders also won that order, but sub-contracted the work to Gourlay Brothers, another Dundee engineering firm.

The ship cost £34,050 to build, plus another £10,322 to be fitted with engines and machinery, and more than £6000 for other equipment and fittings. The total cost for the Discovery was £51,000, equivalent to £4.1m in modern currency. Much of the detail work of fitting out the ship's interior spaces, scientific equipment and provisions was overseen directly by Scott and the ship's newly appointed engineer Reginald Skelton.

Discovery was fitted with a 450-horsepower coal-fired triple expansion steam engine, but had to rely primarily on sail because the coal bunkers did not have sufficient capacity to take the ship on long voyages. At her economical cruising speed of 6 kn (11 km/h), Discovery carried enough coal for only 7,700 nmi (14,300 km) of steaming; the voyage to New Zealand covered over 12,000 nmi (22,000 km). At 8 kn (15 km/h), she could steam only 5,100 nmi (9,400 km).

The ship was considered to be a sailing vessel with auxiliary steam propulsion: when first registered in 1900 Discovery was classified as a sailing ship. Her legal owners were the Royal Geographical Society. As its president, Sir Clements Markham, was a member of the Royal Harwich Yacht Club, Discovery was registered as a private sailing yacht of the RHYC. She carried the official name and prefix 'S.Y. Discovery'. She flew the RHYC's burgee, the emblem of the RGS as a house flag, and the Blue Ensign throughout her first expedition.

She was rigged as a barque (the fore- and mainmasts being square rig and the mizzen mast carrying a fore-aft sail), and the total maximum sail area was 12,296 sq ft (1,142.3 m^{2}). Following the practice of the most modern sailing ships of the time, the windjammers, she carried split topsails to reduce the size of the deck crew needed to handle them. Her spars and sails on the foremast and mainmast were identical to reduce the amount of spares carried and allow easier repairs.

The ship was rigged to carry several large staysails. The funnel was hinged at the base so it could be laid on the deck when the mizzen staysail was rigged once at sea. The Discovery was marginally faster under sail than she was under engine power – her record for distance travelled in 24 hours is 223 nautical miles (413 kilometres), equivalent to 9.2 kn (17.0 km/h).

The ship has a massively built wooden hull designed to withstand being frozen into pack ice and resist crushing. At the time of her launch, Discovery was widely held to be the strongest wooden ship ever built. The hull frames, placed much closer together than was normal, were made of solid sections of oak up to 11 in (28 cm) thick. The outer hull was formed from two layers – one 6 in (15 cm) thick and an outer skin some 5 in (13 cm) thick.

A third lining was laid inside the frames, forming a double bottom and skin around almost the entire hull. This meant that in places the hull was over 2 ft (61 cm) thick, providing not only formidable strength but excellent insulation against the cold. The construction made it impossible to install portholes (and fitting them would have weakened the hull), so the crew relied on 'mushroom vents' on the deck to allow air and light into the interior.

The wood used for the planking varied depending on where in the ship it was laid and what structural purpose it served: the inner layer is Scots pine while the 6 in (15 cm) skin is made of pitch pine, Honduras mahogany or oak. The outer hull is made of English elm and Greenheart. Oak beams run across the hull forming three decks – the lower deck beams are 11 in (28 cm) square in cross-section and are placed less than 3 ft (91 cm) apart along the ship's length. Seven transverse bulkheads, also of wood, provide additional strength and ensured that any ice damage would not flood the entire ship.

To prevent damage from ice floes or crushing, the two-blade propeller could be hoisted out of the way and the rudder could be easily detached and stored aboard. A second rudder and spare propeller blades were carried, and the ship could be steered by use of her sails if her rudder or steering gear was completely disabled. Iron-shod bows were severely raked so that when ramming the ice, they would ride up over the margin and crush the ice with deadweight.

The coal bunkers on each side contained a steel compartment, each of which could hold 60 tons of fresh water. These would be filled on the long ocean trip to and from New Zealand but for the Antarctic expedition the extra coal capacity was more important as ice and snow could be melted each day to provide water, so the tanks would be filled with coal. The metal tanks also contributed to the strength of the lower hull around the boiler and engine spaces.

On 16 March 1900, in the context of significant donations to the approaching expedition by patrons Llewellyn W. Longstaff and the British Government, construction on the Discovery began in Dundee, Scotland, by the Dundee Shipbuilders Company. She was launched into the Firth of Tay on 21 March 1901 by Lady Markham, the wife of Sir Clements Markham, President of the Royal Geographical Society.

== History ==
=== British National Antarctic Expedition ===
The British National Antarctic Expedition departed the UK less than five months after the Discovery was launched and only a week after the ship left Dundee. With limited time between the ship's launch and her departure for Antarctica there was limited time for sea trials. Her speed under steam was tested and proved better than expected – her averaged maximum speed during trials was 9 knots instead of the planned 8 knots. Without a full crew available and short of time neither her builders nor Scott were able to test her performance or handling under sail.

Much of her equipment was also untested, so the long voyage to New Zealand, made via Madeira and Cape Town, would also be the new vessel's shakedown cruise. Before reaching London from Dundee a leak was found from her stern around the rudder post. There was no time to dry dock the ship for a full repair, with Skelton having to make do with applying extra caulking.

The ship was berthed in London loading supplies and equipment until July 1901, when she sailed to Cowes on the Isle of Wight where she anchored during August. In this time she served as the yacht of the RGS during Cowes Week and was toured by several dignitaries, culminating in a visit by King Edward VII and Queen Alexandra on 5 August. The expedition left from Cowes the next day, 6 August 1901.

Scott's first impression of the ship was poor, considering her slow and unresponsive while the shallow hull, built with no protuberances to work well in ice, provided minimal stability. Discovery rolled heavily once in the open sea (she was recorded rolling through 94 degrees – 47 degrees either side of vertical – in the Southern Ocean) and tended to 'gripe' (a strong tendency to turn up into the wind). Shackleton described the ship as a bad sailer, carrying too much sail aft and not enough forward while Scott also worried that the design of the ship's hull was unsuitable for work in pack ice.

But once the expedition reached the Roaring Forties the ship proved to have excellent seakeeping qualities, and because she was heavy and carried relatively little sail area for her size, she could make good progress in high winds and heavy seas without having to reef. The Discovery's unusual rounded, overhanging stern (one of the main changes from the original Bloodhound design) not only provided more protection for the rudder but also prevented all but the largest following seas breaking over the back of the ship and kept the decks dry, although the stern was prone to 'slamming' into waves, making the officers' accommodation and wardroom noisy.

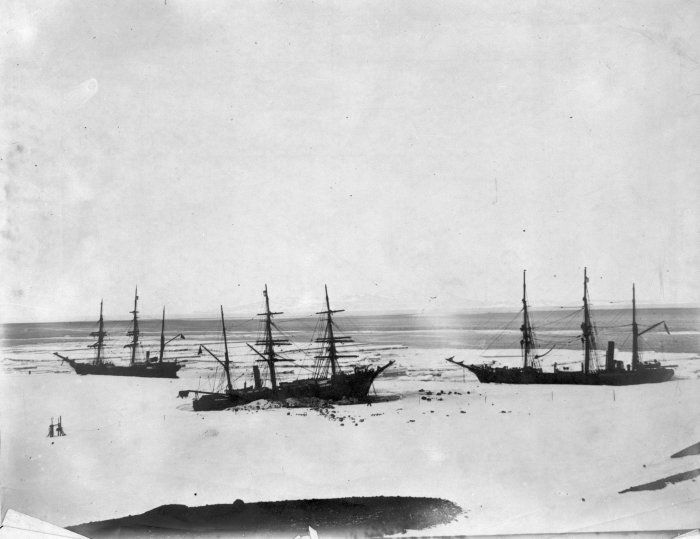
Discovery (centre) trapped by the ice in McMurdo Sound, accompanied by Morning (left) and Terra Nova (right) in February 1904

The expedition travelled to New Zealand via Madeira and Cape Town for resupplying. The ship was put in dry dock for the first time at Lyttelton and the carpenter, Frederick Dailey, prepared a lengthy report detailing the numerous empty bolt holes and slack hull fittings he found. 6 ft (1.8 m) depth of water had seeped into the ship's bilges and lower hold through badly-sealed joints in the planking. While these were repaired there was considerable dispute between the RGS and Dundee Shipbuilders as to who was responsible for the defects, but the Discovery left for the Antarctic on 21 December 1901, after three weeks in New Zealand.

The Antarctic coastline was sighted on 8 January 1902. During the first month Scott began charting the coastline. Then, in preparation for the winter, he anchored in McMurdo Sound in a bay sheltered from the prevailing west wind by the Hut Point Peninsula. The Discovery was moored directly to the ice shelf by anchors and Scott used explosives to blow away part of the shelf so the ship could be protected on three sides.

On 8 February Discovery was surrounded by pack ice on all sides. The expedition divided itself between the ship and the shore, with Discovery being used for accommodation and the prefabricated hut, intended to be the expedition's winter living quarters, was used as a laboratory. Although surrounded by ice the ship was not yet frozen in. In increasingly strong gales the ship would bump, slam and grind against the ice shelf but her strong multi-layered wooden hull withstood the forces which would have ripped open a conventional ship.

By the end of March Discovery was fully frozen into the ice-covered sound. The ship would remain there, locked in ice, for the next two years; the expedition had expected to spend the winter there and to move on in the spring. Despite this, the ship's routine and work continued through the Antarctic winter. The Expedition was able to determine that Antarctica was indeed a continent, and they were able to relocate the South magnetic pole. Scott, Shackleton and Edward Wilson also achieved a Furthest South of 82 degrees 18 minutes.

Discovery proved to be a superb accommodation vessel. The only recurring complaint was that the officers' cabins were extremely cold. They were placed amidships either side of the wardroom and above the boilers and coal bunkers. Once the boilers were extinguished the unheated and deep-frozen mass of coal in the bunkers made it hard to keep heat in the rooms. Ice frequently formed on the cabin walls and Scott reported that, sat at his desk, he had to have his feet in a box of straw to keep warm.

In January 1903 the Morning, commanded by William Colbeck, arrived in McMurdo Sound with extra supplies for the expedition. It was hoped (by both the expedition in Antarctic and the organisers in London) that Discovery would be freed as the ice broke up in the Antarctic summer, allowing her to continue her voyage. But she remained icebound, and the ship and her crew had to overwinter for a second year as the Morning left in March.

Another land expedition was organised over the spring of 1903, with Scott again confident that a second summer would allow Discovery to leave the Sound. In January 1904 a second relief expedition, commanded again by Colbeck, arrived consisting of the Morning and the Terra Nova, with orders to extract the entire expedition and abandon Discovery if the ship was not free of the ice by 25 February.

The two relief ships slowly broke a path through the ice while Scott organised work parties at the Discovery to use saws and pickaxes to cut the ice away from the hull. However, by 10 February the research ship was still locked in the ice and the relief ships were two miles (3.2 kilometres) from the beleaguered ship. Scott began evacuating his equipment and samples from Discovery in preparation to abandon her but on 16 February 1904 the ice suddenly began to break up. After carrying out a number of controlled explosions with dynamite Discovery was freed from the pack and soon afterwards the relief ships were able to draw alongside.

Fifty tons of coal was transferred from the Terra Nova, which had carried extra fuel for the purpose, and the captain of the Morning gave an extra 25 tons. Steam began to be raised on the Discovery on 17 February but before the ship was fully prepared for sea a gale blew up. The ship dragged at her anchor and only just had enough pressure in her boilers to prevent her being blown back onto the ice shelf which had provided her shelter for two years.

Scott attempted to round Hut Point in the teeth of the gale at 11 am on a slight ebb tide but the ship grounded on an uncharted shoal. Attempts were made to force the ship ahead over the obstruction and back her off but the engine lacked the power and the water intakes for her condenser became blocked by ice and churned-up dirt. The ship spent nearly ten hours aground, being bodily slammed and pounded into the ground by the action of the waves and wind.

The captains of the relief ships stood by in preparation for a rescue and the crew feared that their ship would be at best dismasted and at worst split apart. Scott described that evening as "truly the most dreadful" he had spent during the expedition. At 3 am on 18 February the wind moderated, the tide turned and the ship began to slide astern off the shoal under her own weight. Once the stern was afloat the water intakes were cleared and the engine was able to pull the bow off. Inspections showed that Discovery had come through the ordeal almost entirely without damage, losing only some of her external sheathing of greenheart and incurring some minor damage to the rudder. By dawn the ship was clear of the land.

The extra coal taken on from the relief ships meant that Scott did not have to take a direct route back to New Zealand, instead proceeding north via Cape North and the Balleny Islands, a route which also proved the non-existence of land charted by the United States Exploring Expedition in 1840. Off Cape Adare the damaged rudder broke free and the spare had to be fitted.

The three ships regrouped at the Auckland Islands and docked at Lyttelton on 1 April. Discovery then headed east following the clipper route back to the UK, taking some oceanographic soundings and searching for the 'phantom' Dougherty Island as she did so. After passing through the Strait of Magellan she stopped at the Falkland Islands to make magnetic surveys. Discovery arrived back at Spithead on 10 September 1904, 1131 days after her departure.

=== Cargo vessel ===
The British National Antarctic Expedition was acclaimed upon its return but was also in serious financial trouble, and so in 1905, Discovery was sold to the Hudson's Bay Company for £10,000 (a fifth of her original build cost) which used her as a cargo vessel between London and Hudson Bay, Canada. The HBC heavily remodelled the ship for her new purpose, stripping all the accommodation and other rooms below her weather deck in order to maximise cargo space. Features such as her lifting propeller, dredging winches and her original galley stove were removed and sold. The ship's officers were now accommodated in the deckhouses which had housed the ship's laboratories and scientific storerooms while the crew berthed in the focsle.

Discovery made an annual transatlantic trip for the HBC between 1905 and 1911 carrying food, fuel, building materials and gunpowder from London to Charlton Island in Canada (near the HBC's large depot at Moose Factory). The ship was laden with the season's haul of fur hides for the return voyage. Each round trip took around two months and was made in the summer, although the ship often still had to break through ice in the Davis and Hudson Straights.

From the 1912 season Discovery and the other HBC ship, the Pelican, were replaced by a brand new and much larger steam-powered icebreaker, the Nascopie, and the vessel was laid up in London. In October 1913 she was sold for £9,500 to Joseph Foster Stackhouse, a fellow of the Royal Geographical Society who was planning another research expedition to Antarctica. Stackhouse paid the HBC a £1000 initial deposit on the ship but was unable to raise the funds to pay the balance.

=== During and after World War I ===
The start of the First World War saw the planned expedition postponed and Stackhouse died in the sinking of the Lusitania in May 1915, while returning from a fundraising trip to New York City. Following Stackhouse's death the HBC kept his £1000 deposit to cover the interim costs of maintaining Discovery.

The following month she was drydocked and re-rigged at the cost of £55 as part of a scheme financed and run by the HBC to carry wartime supplies from around the world to France – Discovery would be one of around 300 ships chartered via 6600 contracts under the scheme (she was Steamer #141), managed by a specially-formed shell company called the Bay Steamship Company. Discovery sailed from London bound for New York in April but had to put in at Falmouth due to a large leak around her rudder.

The journey took 27 days in bad weather and the ship was found to be in poor condition with many leaking deck seams and a number of mechanical failures. Her eastbound trip was made to La Rochelle carrying caustic soda, sacking and corduroy. More leaks occurred, flooding the cabins and store rooms. Some of her timbers were found to have dry rot and her condenser failed, requiring sea water to be used in her boilers which then needed repairs.

Another refit and repair was made in Swansea in August 1915 and then the ship sailed for Arkhangelsk via the French ports of Nantes, Bordeaux and Brest. Her cargo was 500 tons of French munitions being carried to support the Russian Empire, with Arkhangelsk on the White Sea being the only Russian port in European waters free of German blockade.

The voyage via North Cape brought up more examples of the ship's poor condition as she suffered further leaks and rigging damage. Her return cargo was 557 barrels of methanol, which she carried to Le Havre. Discovery's infamous roll in heavy seas caused some damage to the barrels and her lack of a dedicated cargo deck hatch meant that loading and unloading took much longer than in a purpose-made cargo vessel.

In 1916, Discovery was loaned to the British government to rescue Shackleton's party marooned on Elephant Island. Discovery was refitted in Plymouth and departed on 11 August 1916. Due to the ship's notoriously slow speed she was towed by the collier Polesley until she reached the favourable trade winds. With the First World War still raging, the tow was escorted by two Royal Navy destroyers.

Just four weeks after leaving the UK Discovery reached Montevideo, to learn that Shackleton had effected his crew's own rescue in the Yelcho while Discovery was en route. In order to cover some of the costs of the abortive voyage, Discovery took on a cargo of 5943 sacks of wheat at commercial carriage rates for her return voyage. She returned to Plymouth in November where she was handed back to the HBC. She sailed to Lorient where she unloaded the cargo of grain.

Between January 1917 and March 1918 Discovery carried cargo along the French coast of the Bay of Biscay between Brest and Bayonne. She was released from convoy duty back to the HBC in April 1918 and in June made her last transatlantic voyage, sailing from Cardiff to Charlton Island via Montreal. She twice became stuck in ice in the Hudson Straight near Cape Chidley and Charles Island.

Her condition was such that she was not permitted to carry the valuable furs on the eastbound voyage, taking them only as far as Newfoundland in special wrappings to protect them from water leaks. With a cargo of general goods loaded at St John's, Discovery arrived back at Liverpool in January 1919. Between then and July that year she made further coastal voyages along the French Atlantic coast, through the English Channel to Antwerp.

In July 1919, Discovery was taken up again by the British government for another voyage to Russia, this time in support of the White Russians in the Russian Civil War. With the Red Army in control of Russia's major northeastern cities and ports, the only supply route was via ports on the Black Sea. Discovery departed from Kingston upon Hull and travelled to Gibraltar and across the Mediterranean Sea, reached Istanbul in late August and passed through the Dardanelles and docked at Novorossiysk in September. Here she transferred cargo from another HBC supply ship on the same run (Pelican) and proceeded to Rostov-on-Don, which she reached on 6 October.

A three-week wait for cargo followed before Discovery was loaded with a cargo of nearly 4000 barrels of cement. This was taken to Piraeus (reached on 1 December) and then the ship returned to Istanbul where she loaded a general cargo including bags of nuts, linseed, rugs and carpets, caviar, mohair and copper sheet. She departed for London in mid-February 1920 and refuelled at Gibraltar on 28 February. She unloaded at the East India Docks in London in mid-March.

The progress of the conflict in Russia meant that no further voyages were possible. A slump in the shipping business and the purchase of new, more modern ships by the HBC meant that Discovery was surplus to requirements. She spent a month moored to a buoy in the Thames at Deptford while she was offered for charter but in June was laid up in the South West India Dock. All her equipment was removed to be stored or sold while her machinery was preserved in a layer of grease.

She was still at her berth in South West India Dock in early 1922 when the HBC agreed to loan the ship as a temporary headquarters for the 16th Stepney Sea Scouts.

=== Discovery investigations ===
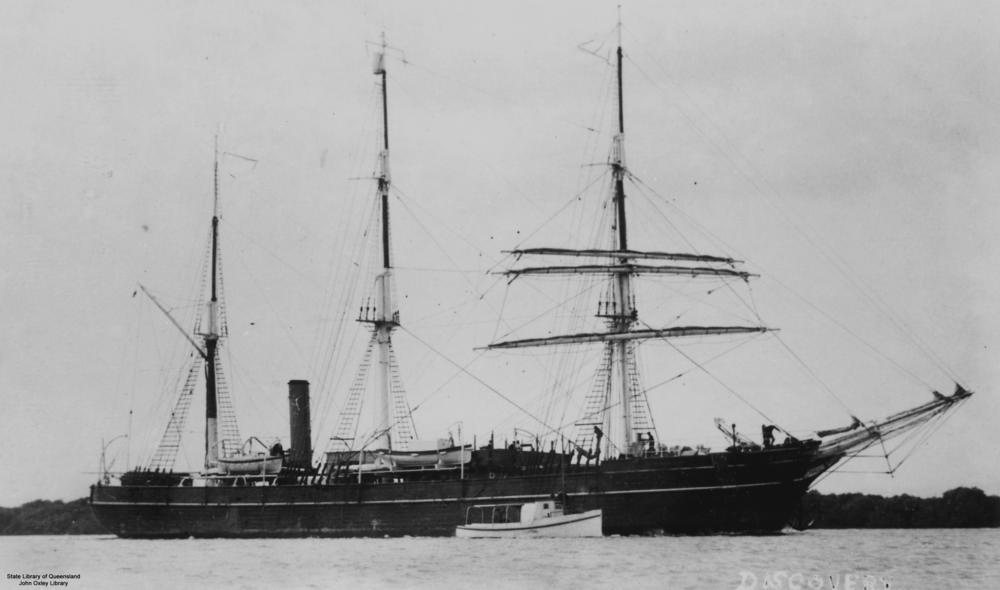
Discovery in Australia

In 1923 her fortunes were revived when the Colonial Office of the British government purchased her for further research work. The Hudson's Bay Company sold Discovery for £5000 and retained a right of first refusal to re-purchase the ship if she was sold in order to prevent a rival firm using her to compete on the Canadian fur trade. The government had bought the vessel to mount long-term projects investigating, charting and analysing the whale populations of the Southern Ocean.

Discovery underwent a £114,000 refit at Vosper & Company which amounted to a rebuilding to put right years of wear and tear and equip the ship for her new purpose. Much of the cost was borne by the Government of the Falkland Islands as the territory was increasingly dependent on whaling for its economy and the voyage would provide essential information on the location, size and management of the whale stocks. Because of this, ownership of the Discovery was vested in the Falkland Islands executive council and her port of registration was changed from London to Port Stanley. Now in the official service of the British government she was also designated as a Royal Research Ship.

Because her new role would require many thousands of miles of open-ocean travel, changes were made to improve Discovery's handling and sailing performance. As suggested by Scott and Shackleton in 1900 her fore- and mainmasts were moved forward (by 4 and 8 feet (1.2 and 2.4 metres) respectively) to make her more balanced and steady on a course while new yards and the addition of split topgallant sails increased her sail area by 20 percent to improve her speed. As built the ship's helm was positioned near the stern and connected to the rudder via chains, while the ship was conned from the bridge forward of the mainmast, creating communication problems between those commanding the ship and those actually steering it.

In her refit a second wheel was positioned on the bridge, operating the rudder via a newly fitted steam-powered steering engine. The original helm and steering gear was retained as an emergency system. All three of her hull skins were extensively re-planked and parts of her keel were replaced with new sections of imported Quebec oak, it proving impossible to obtain English oak of the required shape, size and strength. New cabins and other rooms were built both below deck and in deckhouses. These included biological and chemical laboratories, a library, a darkroom and new cabins and other facilities, including a new wardroom.

The ship was fitted with several winches for handling sounding lines and deep-water trawling nets with cables totalling thousands of fathoms in length, plus an early electronic echo sounder. This allowed the ship to not only chart the depth of the ocean as she travelled but recover samples of the seabed, seawater and specimens of deep-sea fish. She was fitted with electric lighting powered by both a steam generator and a paraffin engine for use when under sail and also now boasted a refrigerated store for fresh provisions. She carried four motorboats of various sizes. In her new form she was re-registered as a steamship.

Stanley Wells Kemp was appointed the project's director of research while Joseph Stenhouse, veteran of the drift of the Aurora, was made captain of Discovery. The ship left Portsmouth in July 1925. The final aspects of the refit and trials had been rushed in order to reach the Southern Ocean before the start of the whaling season in November, which led to a number of faults developing in the ship as she sailed through the Bay of Biscay and she had to put into Dartmouth for repairs and modifications which took two months.

She made her final departure on 24 September and reached Cape Town on 20 December, having stopped only at Ascension Island. She resupplied and took on cargo and mail to be delivered to Tristan da Cunha on her way to South Georgia. During all her movements beyond this point Discovery stopped regularly to take oceanographic surveys which could take up to six hours to complete at each pre-set position.

The ship reached South Georgia on 20 February and was based there for two months while her crew of scientists and seamen worked alongside the whalers, both on shore at Grytviken and at sea, examining the remains of the caught and processed whales and observing their numbers and movements. Discovery herself made hydrographic and oceanographic surveys of the seas around South Georgia and surveys of the poorly-charted island itself and its wildlife were also made.

Due to her delayed departure from Britain these voyages were made in the depths of the South Atlantic winter and the ship's excessive roll, high windage and limited engine power all caused difficulties in her work. On 17 April 1926, Discovery left Grytviken and sailed for the Falkland Islands before returning to Cape Town on 29 June, having taken five weeks to make the eastbound voyage in heavy seas while carrying out her research work.

The difficulties encountered led to Discovery being placed in dry dock at the Simon's Town naval base for three months to be fitted with bilge keels to improve her stability. For the same reason her foremast topgallant and all the yards and topmasts on the mainmast were removed to reduce the weight she carried high up and 'stiffen' the ship. Her donkey boiler, mounted in the forecastle, was removed for the same reason.

For the next season of work Discovery was joined by the British government's brand new purpose-built research steamer, RRS William Scoresby. She returned to South Georgia on 15 December, with her crew finding the alterations had greatly improved her seakeeping and reduced the pronounced roll. She carried out a plankton survey of the surrounding seas until February 1927, when she headed to the South Shetland Islands, where she carried out a programme to 'tag' whales in order to track their movements.

In March Discovery visited Deception Island, which at the time served as a natural harbour to eight large factory ships for further studies. During the southern winter the ship travelled down the coast of the Antarctic Peninsula, carrying out surveys to draw and correct nautical charts. Discovery Sound was explored and surveyed for the first time and was named after the ship. She was at Cape Renard on 24 March, before working back north to Deception Island, still taking regular oceanographic surveys and biological samples.

Discovery was the first ship to take oceanographic readings in the stormy and dangerous Drake Passage, including one survey station just a few miles off Cape Horn. This sequence provided the missing data to construct the first complete view of the Antarctic currents. After anchoring off the Hermite Islands and transiting the Le Maire Strait, Discovery anchored at Port Stanley on 6 May 1927.

A final surveying trip was made back to Cape Town before the expedition's work was concluded and Discovery sailed for Britain. She arrived at Falmouth on 29 September 1927. Sidney Frederic Harmer called the voyage "the most important scientific expedition that has left our shores since the time of the Challenger."

=== BANZARE ===
While Discovery was in the Southern Ocean, the 1926 Imperial Conference considered the question of British imperial sovereignty in Antarctica. At the time only two territories in the Antarctic were formally part of the British Empire – the Falkland Islands and the Ross Dependency. The conference identified seven other parts of the continent, totalling over 3 million square miles (8 million square kilometres) which could be claimed by Britain on the grounds of first-discovery.

With the increasing economic and strategic importance of Antarctica and its waters, it was deemed vital that the British claim be formalised. An expedition would be sent with officers authorised to claim land in the government's name while also carrying out further surveying, exploration and scientific work. The expedition would be the joint responsibility of Britain, Australia and New Zealand, thus becoming the British Australian and New Zealand Antarctic Research Expedition, frequently abbreviated to BANZARE.

The Australian government was to be in charge of the practical aspects of the expedition, under the leadership of the Australian National Research Council. The ANRC identified Discovery as the only suitable vessel to accommodate the expedition. The ship was still under the control of the committee for the Discovery Investigations and owned by the government of the Falkland Islands, who were initially reluctant to part with the ship as their work was still ongoing.

When the Norvegia expedition annexed Bouvet Island for Norway in December 1927, political pressure meant that it was swiftly arranged for Discovery to be leased to Australia free of charge. Antarctic veteran Douglas Mawson was appointed leader of the BANZARE, and he assigned John King Davis, of Shackleton's Nimrod expedition and Mawson's own Australasian Antarctic Expedition as captain of Discovery.

Discovery left London on 1 August 1929, carrying a complement of 25 officers and men, some scientific equipment and a partially-dismantled de Havilland DH.60 Moth light aircraft on her deck, which was to be used for aerial survey work. After loading with coal and further supplies in Cardiff, the ship headed into the Atlantic to follow the clipper route to Cape Town, where Mawson and the scientific staff (most of whom were Australian) would join the ship.

Like Scott, and despite the vessel's modifications made during the 1923 rebuilding, Davis was not initially impressed with Discovery as a sailing vessel, finding her sluggish and awkward in the light winds of the Doldrums and often being unable to point closer than 75 degrees off the wind. He also struggled with the inexperience of the crew, with none of the officers and (despite his efforts) few of the crew having experience in ocean-going sailing ships.

As with her previous captains, Davis' opinion of the ship changed as they reached the strong winds of the higher latitudes. In a gale on 1 October Discovery was able to carry all her sail and was logged as travelling at 10 knots. The ship reached Cape Town on 5 October, making the journey in three days less than she had on her maiden voyage under Scott.

Preparations for the expedition proper included (following Stenhouse's experiences in the same waters) removing all the yards from the ship's mainmast and taking down the fore topgallant yards and storing them on the deck to both reduce the centre of gravity, lessen the roll and hopefully improve performance when steaming. Two new boats, including a motor-whaler, were added to the ship, as well as 40 tons of food and supplies, a library of 100 books, 2000 cases of scientific equipment and over 300 tons of coal.

The twelve scientists, including zoologists, biologists, an ornithologist, a cartographer and a hydrologist, as well as veteran Antarctic photographer Frank Hurley, also joined the ship here. Discovery departed Cape Town on 19 October and called at Île de la Possession, the Kerguelen Islands and Heard Island – the latter reached on 26 November, with parties going ashore to study the wildlife and carry out geographical surveys at each location. The weather was nearly perpetually stormy and after leaving Heard Island the ship was pummelled by three days of continuous gale.

The weather calmed as they headed south and on 8 December Discovery reached the Antarctic ice field and entered the pack ice three days later. The ship continued to work through dense field ice, heavily populated by penguins and seals. The aircraft, fitted as a seaplane was used for scouting and survey work, becoming the first aircraft to be operated in Antarctica. Oceanographic work and trawls of sealife at various depths were made at regular intervals.

A flight on 1 January 1930, with Mawson on board, sighted new land and mountains, which were named Mac. Robertson Land. Davis refused to draw the ship near enough for a landing – an attitude that would be a regular source of conflict between the captain and Mawson. On 4 January, the ship reached Kemp Land, confirming its presence as it had been unseen since its initial discovery in the 1830s. On 12 January Discovery sighted Enderby Land. The first landfall was made the next day, with the Union Jack being planted on Proclamation Island by Mawson.

Two days later Discovery encountered her fellow expedition ship, the Norvegia, still engaged in similar exploratory and territorial work on behalf of Norway. Mawson had been sent regular wireless messages informing of his rival's whereabouts. The Norwegian leader, Hjalmar Riiser-Larsen, was received aboard Discovery. The longitude of the meeting – 44°38′E – became the boundary between the subsequent Australian and Norwegian territorial claims.

After the ships had parted Discovery was swept 150 miles to the west before a fierce storm, once again impressing those aboard with her seaworthiness. Captain Davis was beginning to worry about his coal supplies, leading to more disagreements with Mawson who refused to let up on the expedition's scientific work which added greatly to the fuel consumption and distance travelled.

Working back eastwards, the expedition surveyed and photographed Cape Ann and confirmed it to be the headland recorded by John Biscoe in 1831. Unknown to the BANZARE crew, the Norwegians had also made aerial photographs of the same point and had reached the same conclusion just a few weeks before. With Davis still refusing to risk the ship close inshore, Mawson made a flight over Enderby Land on 25 January and dropped a second flag three miles (4.8 km) inland.

The next day Davis informed Mawson that there were only 120 tons of coal left in Discovery's bunkers and that they had to turn for home. Mawson felt that they should stay until they were down to 80 tons given that, despite the removal of some of her yards and rigging, Discovery was still fully capable of voyaging under sail. Davis was backed up by W. Griggs, his engineer, who felt that the boilers would need cleaning within three weeks.

Reluctantly Mawson agreed to head north. Some oceanographic work was carried out on the return voyage to the Kerguelen Islands, where 190 tons of coal were taken aboard and the boilers washed out. Severe weather meant that Mawson had to abandon his plans for a cruise to Queen Mary Land and instead Discovery carried out a month of biological and oceanographic work in the waters around the islands until she headed for Australia, reaching Adelaide on 1 April 1930.

A second year of research was authorised soon after the expedition's return and the British government's free loan of Discovery was extended. Mawson was still in command. Captain Davis showed no interest in returning for the second expedition but personally recommended the first officer, Kenneth N. MacKenzie, as captain. The second expedition left Hobart on 22 November 1930. She carried 73 tons of supplies, which included 20 live sheep (accommodated in a pen on top of the sounding winch deckhouse) with a ton of fodder. There was also two tons of butter plus an 'electric cow' which would mix water and powdered milk, six tons of potatoes, 7800 eggs, half a ton of fresh meat in the refrigerated locker and 30 tons of fresh water (loaded aboard from a single hosepipe on the dockside). She also carried 430 tons of coal.

With a standard load Discovery normally drew 13 feet (4.0 m) of water but on leaving Hobart she drew 19 feet (5.8 metres). Five days out of port the expedition made its first discovery – an under-ocean ridge rising 6,000 feet (1,800 metres) out of a flat sea floor. This would later be found to be part of the Macquarie Fault Zone.

On 1 December the ship anchored off Macquarie Island, where shore parties were put ashore to study wildlife, the inland lakes and plants while Discovery made soundings and surveys in the coastal waters. On 15 December the expedition rendezvoused with a whaling ship to take on 100 tons of coal and 25 tons of fresh water – an operation which took 16 hours. Scientific records were made of the whales being processed on the factory ship while the transfer was being carried out.

The expedition headed towards a small sliver of known coastline called Adélie Land, hoping to discover and claim land on either side. The southern summer of 1930 proved to be one of extremely heavy ice, with 111 icebergs being sighted from the ship in one day (21 December) alone. Snow flurries, fog and gales hampered navigation but on fine days Discovery could make nearly 150 miles a day but over the Christmas period the ship was blocked in by pack ice. A Norwegian whaler was met on 29 December, which gifted the Discovery a further 50 tons of coal.

On 31 December the ship was struck by a violent storm with winds of up to 70 mph (Force 11 on the Beaufort Scale). The ship was driven against the ice, while larger bergs were blown onto the ship by the wind. For eight hours Discovery was repeatedly slammed into and onto thick ice and battered by bergs but MacKenzie was able to slowly work the ship offshore by use of the engine and, despite the fierce wind, sails. The ship found safe anchorage at Mawson's old base camp site at Cape Denison, where the wind moderated to Force 9. Here readings of the magnetic field were taken over 18 hours, which relocated the South Magnetic Pole and showed it had moved to the northwest since Mawson's previous readings in 1913.

On 5 January 1931, another flag-planting ceremony and proclamation was made as Mawson claimed the newly surveyed coast, Cape Denison and all the land between the coast and the pole for the British Empire as George V Land. During the rest of the month Discovery continued to work westward, prevented by heavy ice from approaching closer than around 100 miles from the coast. Most survey and photography work was carried out by aircraft while the shipboard team continued their oceanographic and biological work.

The aerial team relocated a coastline originally found by the United States Exploring Expedition in 1840 and renamed it and the newly surveyed land around it as the Banzare Coast. The work was still frequently interrupted by gales and storms, which brought many large icebergs and floes around the ship.

On 11 February both the weather and the seas cleared, allowing Discovery to edge in to less than 10 miles from the coast, allowing surveying from the ship and inland flights by the aircraft. This land, entirely unknown before the BANZARE's arrival, was named Princess Elizabeth Land, which was claimed by means of the flag being dropped from the air. The Murray Monolith was discovered and claimed a few days later. By now the ship was back at the coast of Mac. Robertson Land which had been charted the previous year. Now conditions were right to send a party ashore to undertake another flag-planting ceremony.

On 18 February the coal bunkers had only 100 tons of fuel left, which both Mawson and MacKenzie had agreed would be the minimum for the ship's return voyage. The next day Discovery sheltered in the lee of a large iceberg while the topgallant yards were rigged to ready the ship for the ocean crossing. The early days of the northward journey were in the teeth of another furious gale. With only two sails carried on the foremast Discovery still averaged 8.5 knots (15.7 km/h) over 24 hours, in seas with waves over 100 feet (30 metres) high and with crests 1,300 feet (400 metres) apart.

In his diary recording these days MacKenzie called Discovery "my wonderful little ship". The weather eased after three days and Discovery arrived back at Hobart on 19 March 1931, having covered 10,557 miles (16,990 km) since she left.

The ship and most of her crew still had to return to Britain. She did so via the traditional clipper route via Cape Horn, which was rounded on 1 June. She arrived back at her usual berth in London's East India Docks on 1 August 1931, exactly two years after her departure.

=== Boy Scouts/Sea Cadet Corps ===
Having returned to Britain, Discovery's research days were now over. As well as RRS William Scoresby; the British government also had a brand new steamship available for research work. RRS Discovery II had been launched in 1929, partially to tide over the Discovery Committee (still continuing the whale and ocean research started in 1923 – the Discovery Investigations would not conclude until 1951) while the original Discovery was undertaking the BANZARE but also in recognition of the original ship's age.

She had now had thirty years of hard work in some of the most punishing seas in the world. Her limitations, not being originally designed for open-ocean research work, were clear – despite improvements she was still slow, ponderous and notoriously prone to rolling. As both Davis and MacKenzie found, it was increasingly difficult to find crew with sufficient experience to man traditional sailing vessels and when used purely as a steamship Discovery lacked the engine power and bunker capacity for the work required.

In the years following her return from Australia Discovery was laid-up and offered for charter. Several proposed expeditions were either offered to the ship (often at little or no charge) or expressed interest in using her, but none came to fruition. Either the proposed expedition failed to raise the required funds in the years of the Great Depression or the organisers felt that Discovery was unsuitable for their purpose.

The Crown Agents, the statutory corporation which was the ship's ultimate legal owner, made moves to sell or dispose of the ship in 1935. Two members of the Discovery Committee worked to find a means to ensure the ship's survival and recognition of her national importance. The solution was found in 1936 when she was presented to the Boy Scouts Association as a static training ship for Sea Scouts in London. She was kept at a mooring in the centre of London on the Victoria Embankment near Westminster Bridge.

During the Second World War Discovery served as the headquarters and depot ship for the River Emergency Service, a network of first aid stations and 'floating ambulances' using requisitioned pleasure craft. In 1941 a barrage balloon broke its moorings and became entangled in the ship's main course yardarm. When the balloon was cut free it was found that the yard was rotten and all the yards and spars were removed. In 1943 her boilers and machinery were removed.

Previously it was thought these had been scrapped to provide material for the war effort, but in 2016 a 1943 advert by a salvage firm was found offering the entire contents of the engine room for sale as a single lot, suggesting the equipment was removed for reuse although its ultimate fate is unknown.

To maintain the ship's trim and stability with the loss of her machinery the bilges and shaft tunnel were filled with ballast in the form of small rocks (shingle). The former engine space became a mess hall and the boiler room and coal bunkers became a classroom. During the Festival of Britain in the summer of 1951 (held at South Bank just across the river from Discovery's mooring), the ship hosted an exhibition on Antarctica and the history of its exploration. This required opening much of the existing crew quarters as public exhibition space and the former water tanks were removed and replaced with new crew quarters.

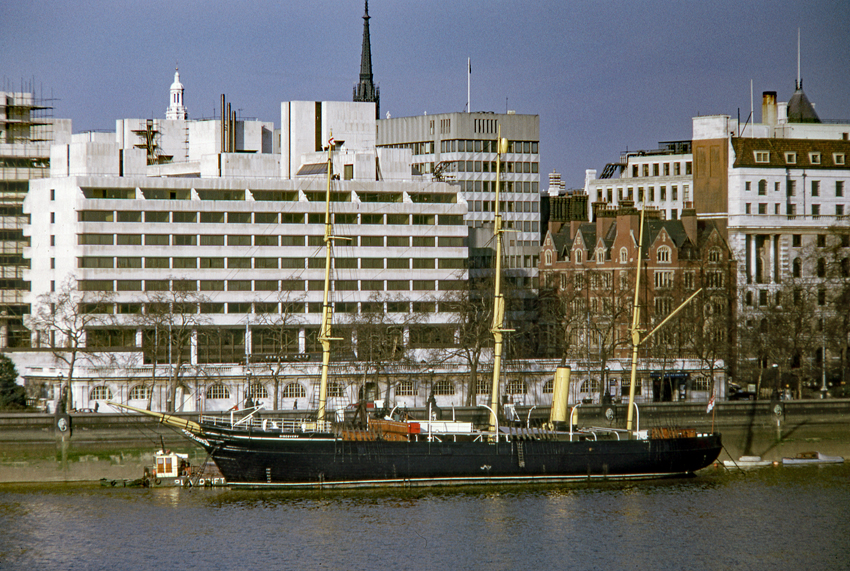
RRS Discovery moored on the Embankment in London

In the 1950s the ageing ship proved too costly for the Scout Association to maintain and she was transferred to the Admiralty in 1954 and formally commissioned as HMS Discovery for use as a drill ship for the Royal Naval Volunteer Reserve and the Royal Naval Auxiliary Service, and also as a training ship for the Westminster Sea Cadet Corps.

The RN carried out another refitting which saw virtually all the remaining accommodation and fittings from the ship's original 1900 build and the 1923 Vospers rebuild removed or remodelled. In 1960, following reforms to the reserve forces, HMS Discovery became part of the newly unified Royal Naval Reserve and was the flagship of the Admiral Commanding, Reserves, thus becoming one of only two sailing ships to fly the White Ensign and an Admiral's flag during the 20th century, along with HMS Victory.

The Navy maintained the ship but this was rarely in a manner primarily concerned with retaining her historical fabric or her integrity as a sailing vessel, and as the wooden ship passed her 70th birthday (and 40 years moored in the Thames without dry-docking) her condition deteriorated. When no longer of use to the Navy, she was in danger of being scrapped.

The Maritime Trust, into whose care she passed in 1979, saved her from the breaker's yard. Her future secured, she was berthed first on the River Thames next to HMS Chrysanthemum and HMS President, and later in St Katharine Docks. During this time, she remained the home and training ship of the Westminster Sea Cadet Corps. Despite significant superficial deterioration and some rotten timbers in her outer and upper hull, Discovery was found to be sound below the waterline and structurally solid.

She reverted to the Royal Research Ship (RRS) designation and was open to the public as a museum. The Sea Cadets unit eventually relocated to onshore premises in Pimlico situated in the converted basement of a local council estate. The Maritime Trust spent some £500,000 on essential restoration until she was passed into the ownership of the Dundee Heritage Trust in 1985.

=== Transportation from London to Dundee ===
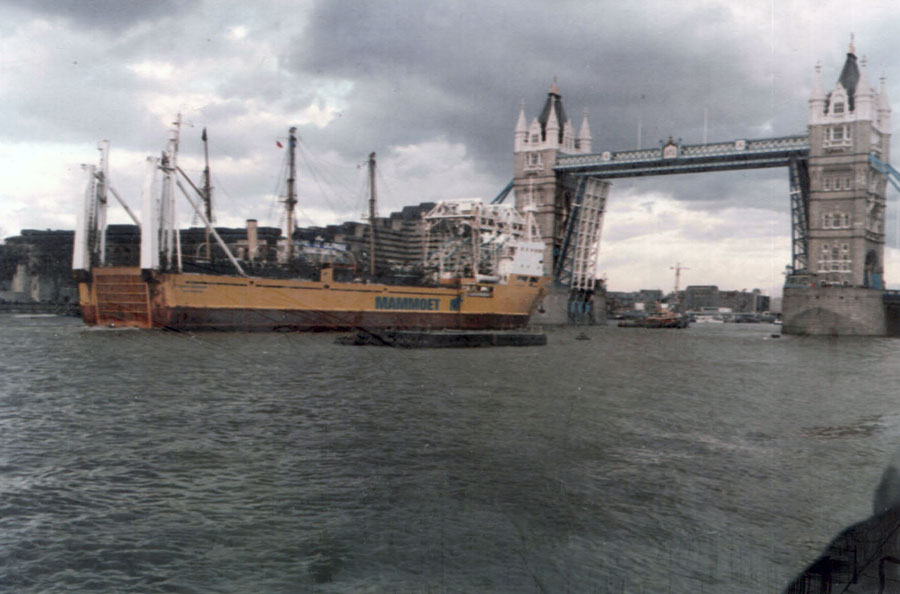
RRS Discovery aboard Happy Mariner about to pass eastwards through the open Tower Bridge

On 28 March 1986, Discovery left London aboard the semi-submersible docklift ship Happy Mariner to make her journey home to the Scottish city that had built her. She arrived at Victoria Dock on the River Tay on 3 April – the first time she had been back to Dundee since her construction.

=== Discovery Point, Dundee ===
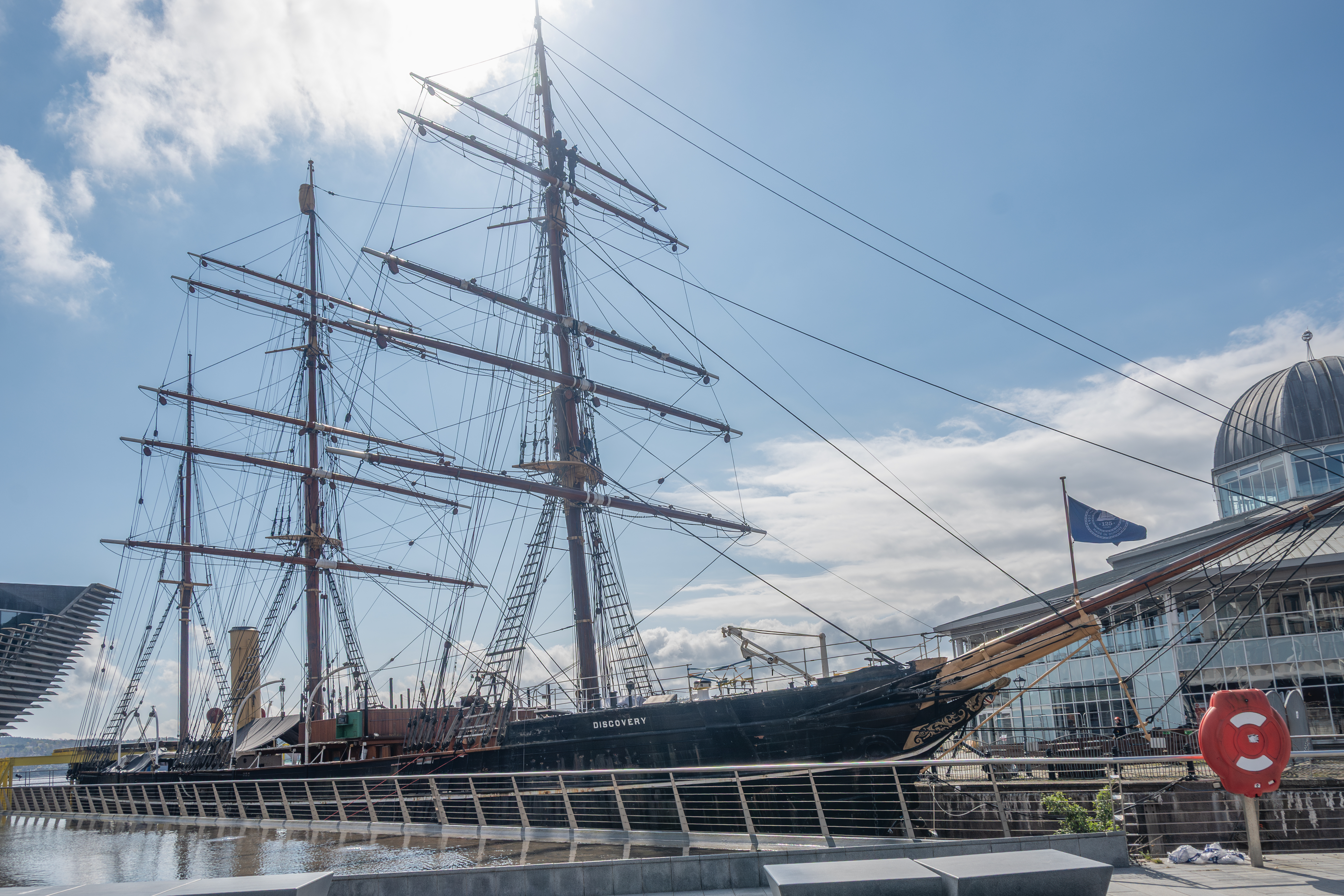
RRS Discovery on display at Discovery Point, Dundee

Placed in a custom-built dock in 1992, Discovery is now the centrepiece of Dundee's visitor attraction Discovery Point. She is one of only two surviving expedition ships from the Heroic Age of Antarctic Exploration, the other being the Norwegian ship Fram. The ARA Uruguay, which survives and sailed in the Antarctic in 1903, is excluded from this group, as it was not built specifically for Antarctic Exploration.

She is displayed in a configuration as near as possible to her 1923 state, when she was refitted in the Vosper yard at Portsmouth. She is listed as part of the National Historic Fleet. Discovery Point is a fully accredited museum and has won numerous national awards, as well as being a 5-star rated tourist attraction with VisitScotland. In 2008, Discovery and the associated polar collections were named as a Recognised Collection of National Significance.

Since the 1990s, the Discovery Point museum has concentrated on interpreting the vessel on all of her voyages, with personal items from the ship's crew as well as information on her scientific activities. Items range from the games played by the crew on her first expedition to examples of sea fauna. Star objects on display include Captain Scott's rifle and pipe.

Discovery's three main voyages, the National Antarctic Expedition (1901–1904), the Discovery Oceanographic Expedition (1925–1927) and the BANZARE expedition (1929–31), are all explored in the museum through film and photographic evidence with artefacts from each era represented. The museum also holds other pieces from Scott's subsequent Terra Nova expedition and Shackleton's Endurance expedition.

The ship also features on the crest of the coat of arms of the British Antarctic Territory.

== Subsequent ships ==
There have been three subsequent royal research ships named Discovery. The second, RRS Discovery II (1929), and third, RRS Discovery (1962), subsequently left service. A fourth ship is the current RRS Discovery, which was built in 2013.

The spaceship Discovery One in Arthur C. Clarke's 1968 novel 2001: A Space Odyssey was named by Clarke after RRS Discovery; Clarke used to eat his lunch aboard her, as she was moored near the office where he worked in London.

The Space Shuttle Discovery is named for RRS Discovery, and other famous ships of the same name, particularly Captain Cook's HMS Discovery and Henry Hudson's Discovery.

== See also ==
- List of Antarctic exploration ships from the Heroic Age, 1897–1922.
