= 1830 in the United Kingdom =

Events from the year 1830 in the United Kingdom. This year sees a change of monarch.

== Incumbents ==
- Monarch – George IV (until 26 June), William IV (starting 26 June)
- Prime Minister – Arthur Wellesley, 1st Duke of Wellington (Tory) (until 16 November); Charles Grey, 2nd Earl Grey (Whig) (starting 22 November)
- Foreign Secretary – George Hamilton-Gordon, 4th Earl of Aberdeen (until 22 November) Henry John Temple, 3rd Viscount Palmerston (from 22 November)
- Home Secretary – Robert Peel (until 22 November) William Lamb, 2nd Viscount Melbourne (from 22 November)
- Secretary of War – George Murray (until 22 November) Earl of Ripon (from 22 November)

== Events ==
- 2 February – Yorkshire Museum opened by Yorkshire Philosophical Society in York.
- 5 February – A fire destroys the Argyll Rooms in London, where the Philharmonic Society of London presents concerts, but firemen are able to prevent its further spread by use of their new equipment, steam-powered fire engines.
- May – The first portion of Southend Pier is completed.
- 24 June – Last person to stand in the pillory in England, Peter Bosse, for perjury.
- 26 June – King George IV dies and is succeeded by his younger brother William IV. From this time, the sum voted by Parliament for the civil list is restricted to the expenses of the Royal Household, removing any residual Crown responsibilities for the cost of civil government.
- 28 June – First police officer to be killed on duty in the UK, Joseph Grantham of the new Metropolitan Police Service in London.
- 23 July – Beerhouse Act 1830 liberalise regulations on the brewing and sale of beer by individuals.
- August – General election results in a Tory victory, but with a reduced majority.
- 28 August – Machine-breaking Swing Riots break out in Kent and spread across southern and eastern England.
- 31 August – Edwin Budding is granted a patent for the invention of the lawnmower.
- 6 September – Otmoor riots: mass demonstration against enclosure of Otmoor in Oxfordshire.
- 15 September – Liverpool and Manchester Railway opens, the world's first intercity passenger railway operated solely by steam locomotives. At the opening, Liverpool MP William Huskisson is accidentally killed by Stephenson's Rocket, thereby becoming the first railway casualty. The works include notable tunnels at Edge Hill, Liverpool.
- 11 November – The Liverpool and Manchester Railway begins carrying mail.
- 22 November – The Whig Earl Grey succeeds the Duke of Wellington as Prime Minister and forms the Grey Ministry.
- 16 December – Last hanging for piracy at Execution Dock, Wapping in London.

=== Ongoing ===
- First Anglo-Ashanti war (1823–1831)

=== Undated ===
- Southern Ocean Expedition: John Biscoe sets out on an expedition to find new seal-hunting grounds in the Southern Ocean.
- Geographical Society of London established.
- First brine bath opened at Droitwich Spa.
- Sir Jonah Barrington (being resident in France to avoid his creditors) is removed from the Irish judiciary following an Address to the King by both Houses of Parliament, a unique event.
- Austins of Derry established in Northern Ireland. At closure in 2016 it will be the world's oldest independent department store.
- McVitie's founded as McVitie & Price's biscuit bakery in Edinburgh.
- Price's Patent Candles founded by William Wilson at Vauxhall, London.

== Publications ==
- Edward Bulwer's (anonymous) novel Paul Clifford.
- The first volume of Charles Lyell's work Principles of Geology.
- Alfred Tennyson's collection Poems, Chiefly Lyrical.

== Births ==
- 3 February – Robert Cecil, afterwards Marquess of Salisbury, Prime Minister (died 1903)
- 11 April – John Douglas, architect (died 1911)
- 22 April – Emily Davies, pioneer of women's rights and education (died 1921)
- 20 July – Clements Markham, geographer, explorer and writer (died 1916)
- 5 December – Christina Rossetti, poet (died 1894)
- 23 December – Charlotte Alington Barnard ('Claribel'), ballad composer (died 1869)

== Deaths ==
- 7 January – Sir Thomas Lawrence, painter (born 1769)
- 16 March – Sir Robert Farquhar, colonial administrator (born 1776)
- 26 June – King George IV (born 1762)
- 15 September – William Huskisson, Member of Parliament (born 1770)
- 18 September – William Hazlitt, essayist (born 1778)
- 7 December – Joseph Stannard, marine and landscape painter (born 1797)
