= Douglas Peak =

Douglas Peak may refer to:

- Douglas Peak (Antarctica), a 1,525 metres (5,000 ft) peak in Antarctica,
- Douglas Peak (New Zealand), a 3,077 metres (10,095 ft) mountain on the South Island of New Zealand

== See also ==
- Douglas Peaks, a group of peaks in the Heritage Range, Ellsworth Mountains, Antarctica
