= Nimrod Islands =

Phantom islands

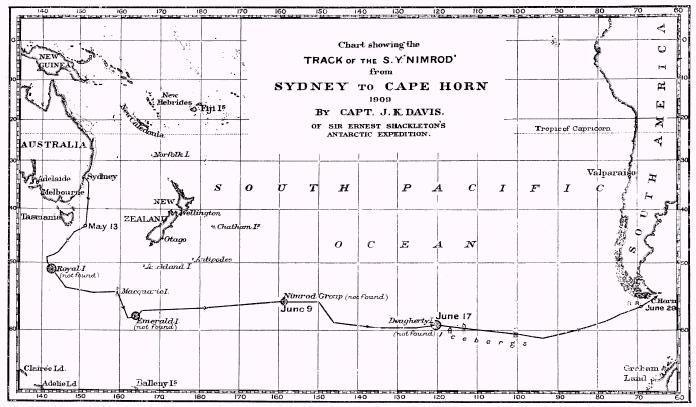
1909 search for Nimrod Group and other phantom islands

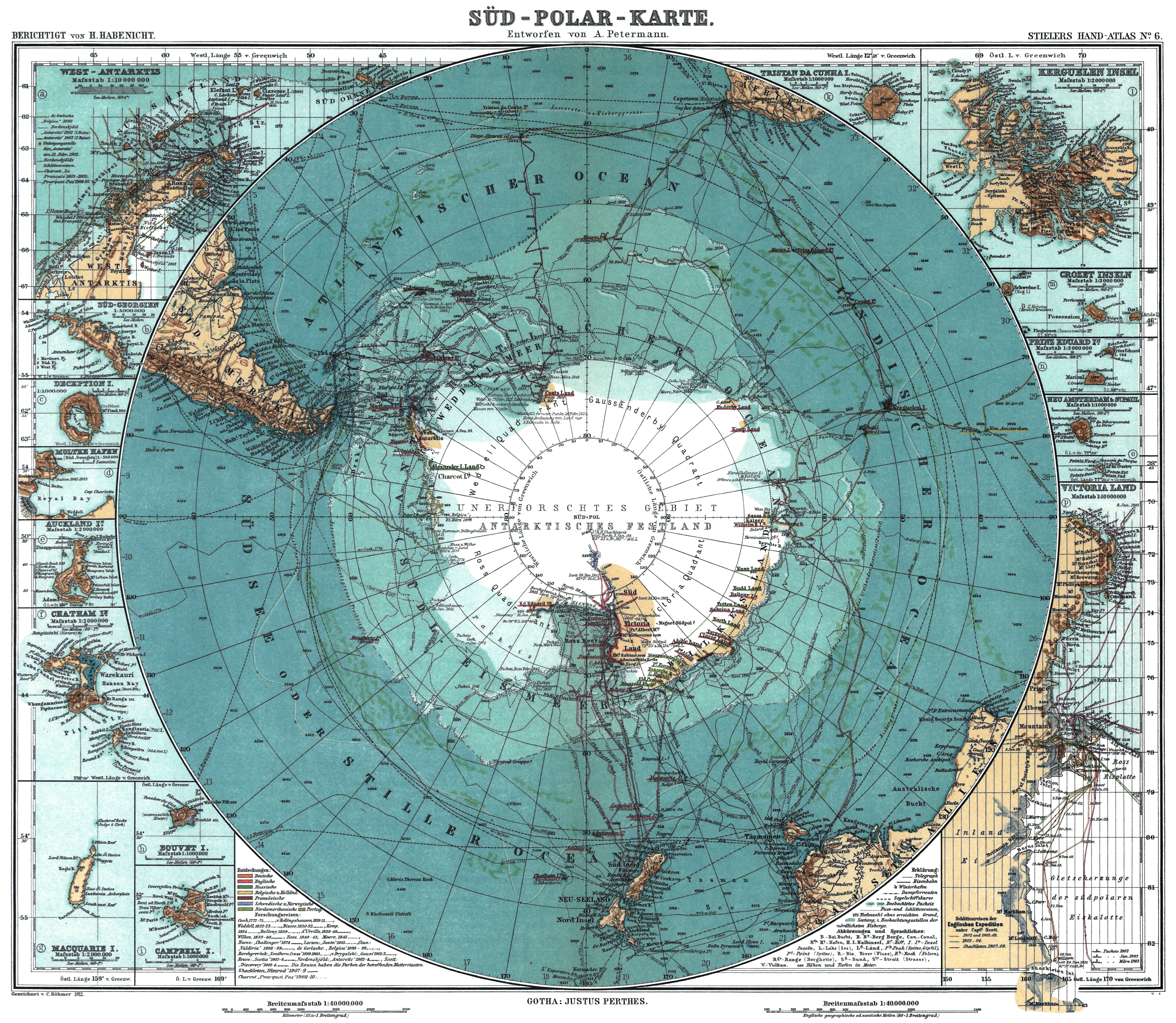
Historic Antarctic map of 1912 with "Nimrod Gruppe"

The Nimrod Islands were a group of islands first reported in 1828 by Captain Eilbeck of the ship Nimrod while sailing from Port Jackson around Cape Horn. Their reported location was east of Emerald Island and west of Dougherty Island, at approximately 56°S 158°W. They are now considered phantom islands.

The explorer John Biscoe in the brig Tula searched for the Nimrod Group without success in 1831 during the Southern Ocean Expedition. John King Davis, sailing aboard a different Nimrod, searched the location in June 1909 following Shackleton's famous Nimrod Expedition to Antarctica, and the Norwegian vessel Norvegia outfitted by Lars Christensen searched again in 1930; both expeditions reported empty seas. Captain J.P. Ault of the magnetic survey vessel Carnegie attempted to approach the location in December 1915 but was deterred by weather.

== See also ==
- 1906 German map showing Nimrod Group
- Royal Company's Islands
- Emerald Island (phantom)
- Dougherty Island
- New Zealand Subantarctic Islands, real islands in the same general region.
