= Wordie Nunatak =

Nunatak in Enderby Land, Antarctica

Wordie Nunatak (66°16′S 51°31′E) is a rock outcrop 4 nautical miles (7 km) southeast of Mount Biscoe and 4 nautical miles (7 km) east-northeast of Mount Hurley. Discovered in January 1930 by the British Australian New Zealand Antarctic Research Expedition (BANZARE), 1929–31, under Mawson, and named for James M. Wordie.
