= McDonald Ridge =

McDonald Ridge (66°20′S 52°15′E) is a mostly ice-covered ridge between Johnston Peak and Douglas Peak, about 22 nautical miles (41 km) southeast of Mount Biscoe in Enderby Land, Antarctica. It was plotted from air photos taken from Australian National Antarctic Research Expeditions aircraft in 1956, and was named by the Antarctic Names Committee of Australia for K.R. McDonald, a radio officer at Mawson Station in 1961.
