= Southern Ocean Expedition =

The Southern Ocean Expedition (1830–1833) was an expedition to Antarctica.

== Background ==
In 1830, the English whaling company Samuel Enderby & Sons appointed John Biscoe master of the brig Tula and leader of an expedition to find new seal-hunting grounds in the Southern Ocean. Accompanied by the cutter Lively, the Tula left London and by December had reached the South Shetland Islands. The expedition then sailed further south, crossing the Antarctic Circle on 22 January 1831, before turning east at 60°S.

Just over a month later, on 24 February 1831, the expedition sighted bare mountain tops through the ocean ice. Biscoe correctly surmised that they were part of a continent and named the area Enderby Land in honour of his patrons. On 28 February a headland was spotted, which Biscoe named Cape Ann; the mountain atop the headland would later be named Mount Biscoe. Biscoe kept the expedition in the area while he began to chart the coastline, but after a month his and his crews' health were deteriorating. The expedition set sail toward Australia, reaching Hobart, Tasmania in May, but not before two crew members had died from scurvy.

The expedition wintered in Hobart before heading back toward the Antarctic. On 15 February 1832 Adelaide Island was discovered, and two days later the Biscoe Islands. A further four days later, on 21 February, more extensive coastline was spotted. Surmising again that he had encountered a continent, Biscoe named the area Graham Land, after First Lord of the Admiralty Sir James Graham. One source suggests John Biscoe had sighted Anvers Island rather than the Antarctic continent and another that the expedition made a landing there.

Before heading homeward, Biscoe again began charting the new coastline the expedition had found and by the end of April 1832 he had become the third man (after James Cook and Fabian von Bellingshausen) to circumnavigate the Antarctic continent. On the journey home, one calamity befell the expedition: in July, the Lively was wrecked at the Falkland Islands. The expedition nonetheless returned to London safely by the beginning of 1833.

As well as exploring the Antarctic coastline, the expedition had also tried in vain to rediscover the Aurora Islands and Nimrod Islands. These were islands in the Southern Ocean that other mariners had claimed to have found, but eventually, during the twentieth century, they were declared to be phantoms.

== See also ==
- List of Antarctic expeditions
