= Mount Biscoe =

Mountain in Enderby Land, Antarctica

Coordinates: 66°13′24″S 51°21′28″E

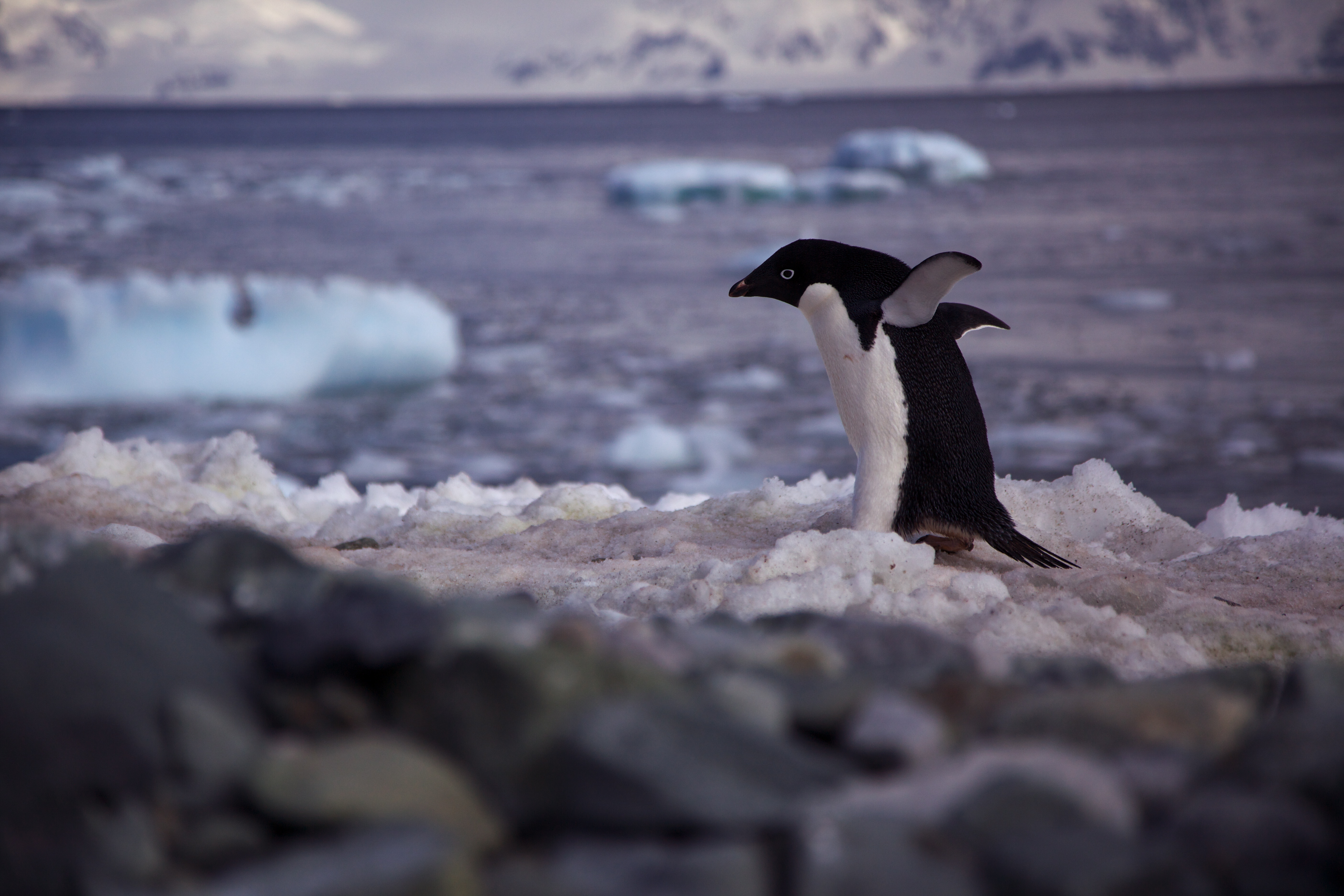
Adélie penguins breed in the IBA

Mount Biscoe is a distinctive black peak, the easternmost and largest of two ice-free rock massifs located 6 km south-west of Cape Ann on the coast of Enderby Land in Antarctica. About 700 m in height, it lies 7 km north-west of Wordie Nunatak, and 7 km north-east of Mount Hurley.

== Discovery and naming ==
The mountain was seen from the Discovery by the British Australian and New Zealand Antarctic Research Expedition (1929-31) and named by Sir Douglas Mawson on 13 March 1931, after explorer John Biscoe who is thought to have discovered the feature a century earlier and called it Cape Ann after his wife. Mawson applied the name Cape Ann to the nearby headland. The mountain's position was fixed by an ANARE survey party in 1957.

== Important Bird Area ==
A 361 ha site covering the beaches, and extending up the lower slopes of the mountain to an altitude of 200 m, has been designated an Important Bird Area (IBA) by BirdLife International because it supports about 29,000 breeding pairs of Adélie penguins, based on 2011 satellite imagery. Thousands of Antarctic petrels breed on the slopes above the Adélie colony.
