= Johnston Peak =

Mountain in Antarctica

Johnston Peak (66°16′S 52°6′E) is a sharp dark peak in Antarctica, 7 nautical miles (13 km) north of Mount Marr and 11 nautical miles (20 km) northwest of Douglas Peak. It was discovered in January 1930 by the British Australian New Zealand Antarctic Research Expedition under Mawson, who named it for Professor Thomas Harvey Johnston, the chief biologist to the expedition.

== See also ==
- McDonald Ridge, ice-covered ridge between Johnston Peak and Douglas Peak
