= Dundee Shipbuilders Company =

Scottish shipbuilding company

- Defunct: Unknown
- Fate: Defunct in end of Dundee Shipbuilding
- Headquarters: Dundee, Scotland

Dundee Shipbuilders Company (also known as the Dundee Shipbuilding Company) was a Scottish shipbuilding company, renowned for building the RRS Discovery (1901).

The Dundee Shipbuilders Company took purchase of the Dundee yards of Alexander Stephen and Sons in 1893. This included the Terra Nova then under construction and launched in 1894.

The company built and repaired ship at the Panmure Shipyard in Dundee. The marine works brick buildings are still extant and now converted to residential use.

Reductions in the volumes of shipbuilding in Dundee and Scotland forced the company into loss and subsequent liquidation in 1906.
