= Emerald Island (phantom) =

Nonexistent subantarctic South Pacific island

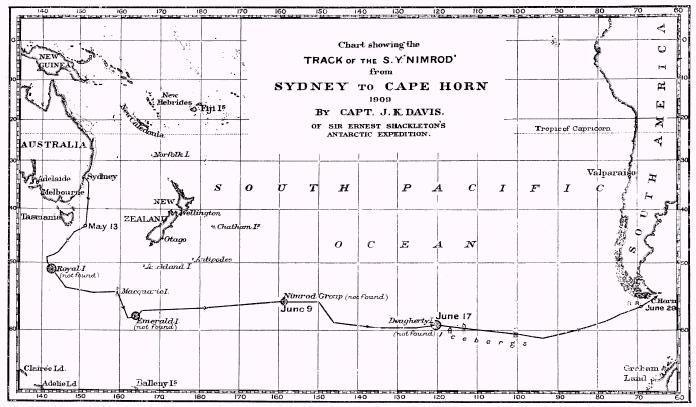
1909 search for Emerald and other phantom islands

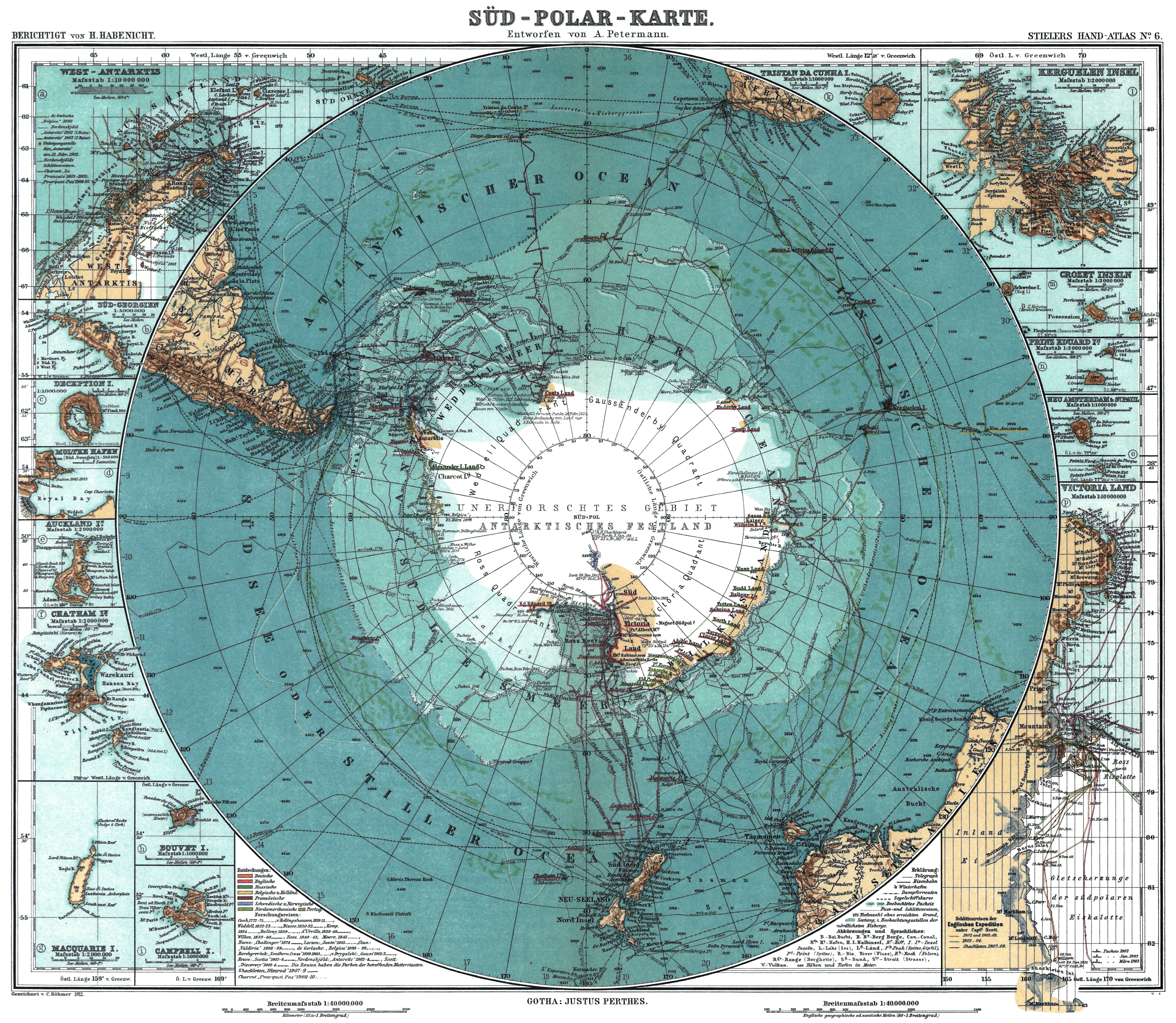
1912 German map showing Emerald Island south of Macquarie Island

The Emerald Island is a phantom island reported to lie between Australia and Antarctica and south of Macquarie Island. It was first sighted by the British sealing ship Emerald, captained by William Elliot, in December 1821, and the name of the supposed island is derived from the name of this ship. It was presumed to be a small (but high and mountainous) island located at 57°30′S 162°12′E.

No trace of the island was found by the 1840 United States Exploring Expedition. Although a captain visiting Port Chalmers reported seeing it sometime before 1890, a search by the Nimrod in 1909 turned up nothing. Nevertheless, it appeared on a map as late as 1987 in a desk calendar book (with atlas) published by American Express.

The abyssal plain on the ocean floor beneath the supposed location of this phantom island is named Emerald Basin.

== See also ==
- Royal Company's Islands
- Nimrod Islands
- Dougherty Island
