= Mount Hurley =

Mountain in Enderby Land, Antarctica

Mount Hurley (66°17′S 51°21′E) is a snow-covered massif with steep bare slopes on the west side, standing 7 nautical miles (13 km) south of Cape Ann and 3 nautical miles (6 km) south of Mount Biscoe, Antarctica. It was discovered in January 1930 by the British Australian New Zealand Antarctic Research Expedition of 1929–31 under Mawson, who named it for Captain James Francis (Frank) Hurley, a photographer with the expedition. Hurley also served with the Australasian Antarctic Expedition under Mawson, 1911–14, and with the Imperial Trans-Antarctic Expedition under Ernest Shackleton, 1914–17.

== See also ==
- Rudmose Brown Peak
