= Discovery Sound =

Antarctica Strait

Discovery Sound or Pinochet Strait (64°31′S 63°1′W) is an east-west trending channel 0.5 nautical miles (1 km) wide, between Guepratte Island and Briggs Peninsula, on the northeast side of Anvers Island, in the Palmer Archipelago. The channel was discovered by a German expedition under Eduard Dallmann, 1873–74, and in 1903–05 was charted by the French Antarctic Expedition under Jean-Baptiste Charcot. During 1927 it was explored by Discovery Investigations personnel on the Discovery who applied the name.
