= Royal Company's Islands =

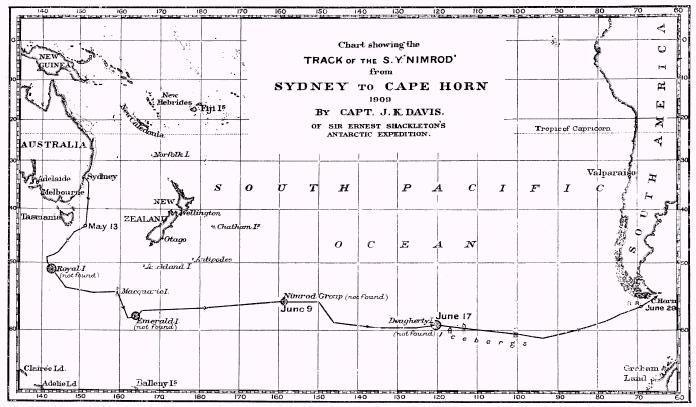
1909 search for Royal Company and other phantom islands

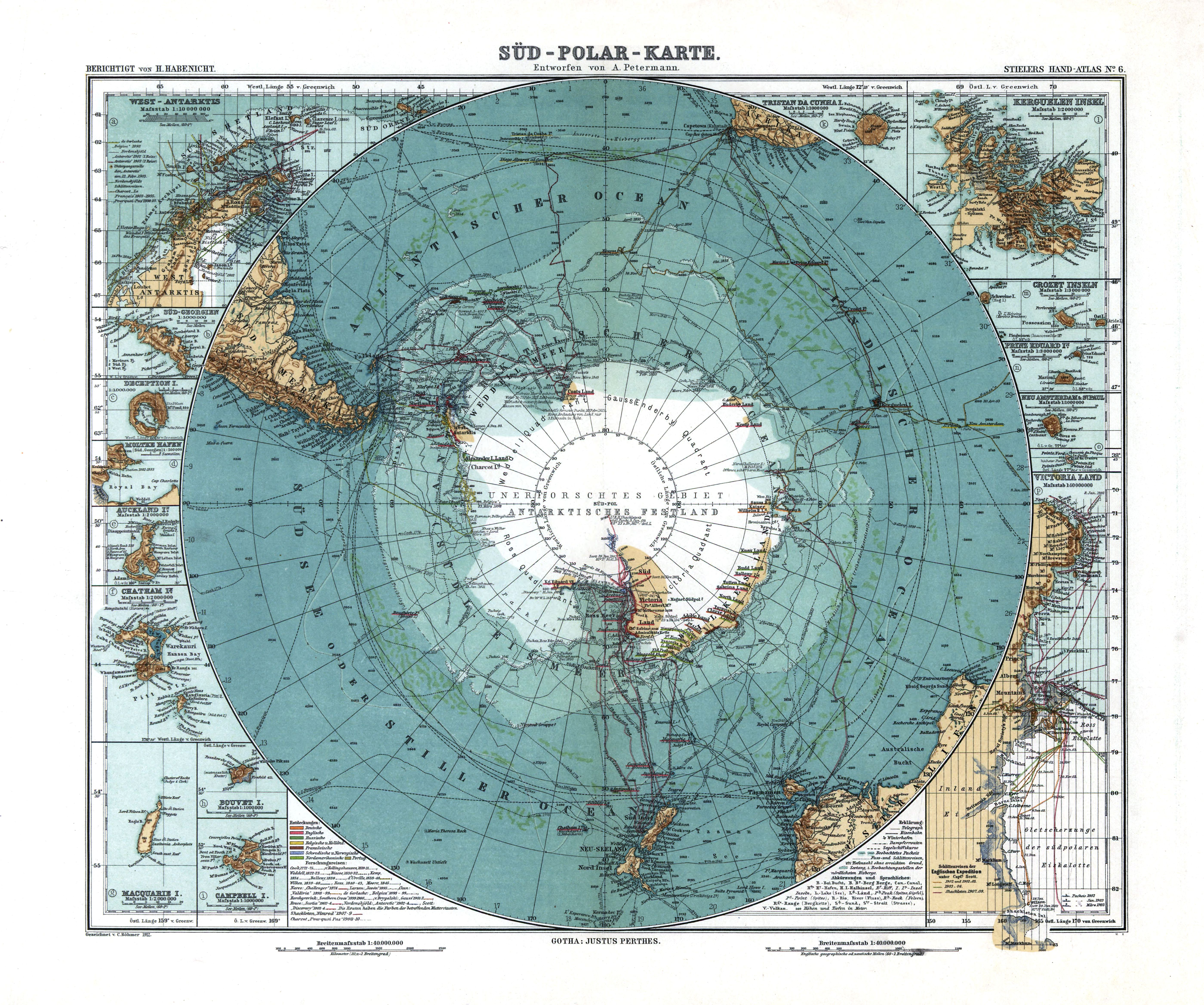
1912 German map showing Royal Company Islands southwest of Tasmania

The Royal Company's Islands are a group of phantom islands reported by some early explorers to lie southwest of Tasmania. They were first heard of before 1840, but the original report cannot be traced. Many old charts show them at 50°20′S 140°0′E or 52°20′S 143°0′E.

The islands' existence was disproved as early as 1840 by the United States Exploring Expedition. From 1889 to 1902 several vessels passed through the islands' vicinity without noting any landforms, and in 1904 the UK Hydrographic Office finally decided to remove them from all Admiralty charts.

In October 1894 the 'Antarctic' (H. Bull's exploratory whaling expedition sponsored by Svend Foyn) steered for the Royal Company's Islands "supposed to be situated in about lat. 51 degrees S,. and long. 142 E." They searched for a couple of days, but met with gales. Not finding any islands, they headed for Macquarie Island. Further searches by the Nimrod in 1909 and the Aurora in 1912 turned up nothing.

== See also ==
- Emerald Island (phantom)
- Nimrod Islands
- Dougherty Island

== References and sources ==
Sources

- Bayldon, Francis J. (July 1935). "The royal company islands". The Australian Geographer. 2 (7): 27–30. doi:10.1080/00049183508702139.
