= Rudmose Brown Peak =

Mountain in Antarctica

Rudmose Brown Peak (66°22′S 51°4′E) is a peak 7 nautical miles (13 km) south of the coast and 8 nautical miles (15 km) southwest of Mount Hurley. It was discovered in January 1930 by the British Australian New Zealand Antarctic Research Expedition (BANZARE) of 1929-31 under Mawson, who named this feature for Dr. Robert Neal Rudmose-Brown, a naturalist of the Scottish National Antarctic Expedition of 1902–04, a member of the Scott Polar Research Committee of 1939–41, and author of numerous books and articles on Antarctica.
