= Latham Peak =

Mountain in Antarctica

Latham Peak (66°21′S 51°48′E) is an Antarctic peak projecting through the icecap 16 nautical miles (30 km) southeast of Cape Ann and 8 nautical miles (15 km) northwest of Mount Marr. It was discovered in January 1930 by the British Australian New Zealand Antarctic Research Expedition under Mawson, who named it for Rt. Hon. Sir John Greig Latham, Minister for External Affairs in the Australian Government, 1931–34, and later Chief Justice of Australia.
