= Mount Marr =

Mountain in Enderby Land, Antarctica

Mount Marr (66°24′S 52°7′E) is a rock peak which rises above the surrounding ice surface 8 nautical miles (15 km) south of Johnston Peak and 8 nautical miles (15 km) west of Douglas Peak, in Enderby Land, Antarctica. It was discovered in January 1930 by the British Australian New Zealand Antarctic Research Expedition (BANZARE) under Douglas Mawson and was named after James W.S. Marr, a zoologist on the expedition, whose services were lent to BANZARE by the British Discovery Investigations Committee.

== See also ==
- Latham Peak
