= Luis Pardo =

Chilean naval officer

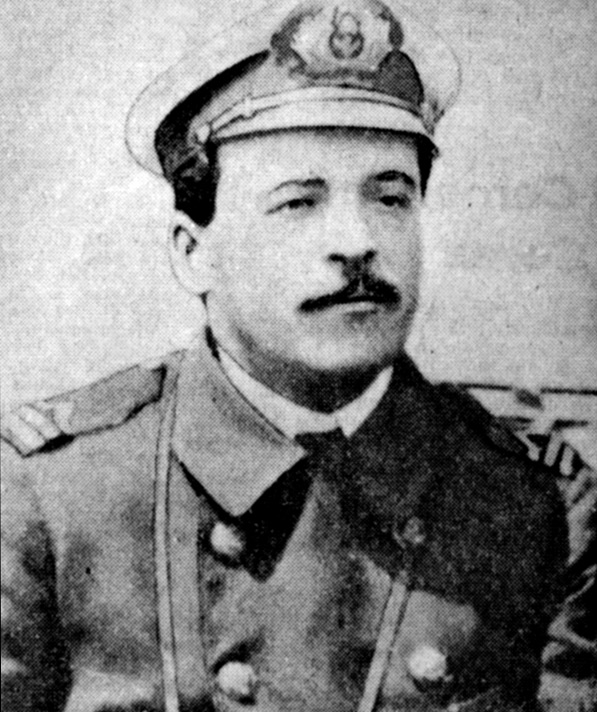
- Born: Luis Alberto Pardo Villalón; 20 September 1882; Santiago, Chile
- Died: 21 February 1935 (aged 52); Santiago, Chile
- Military career
- Branch: Chilean Navy
- Service years: 1900–1919
- Rank: Senior lieutenant

Luis Alberto Pardo Villalón (20 September 1882 – 21 February 1935) was a Chilean Navy officer who, in August 1916, commanded the steam tug Yelcho to rescue the 22 stranded crewmen of Sir Ernest Shackleton's ship, Endurance, part of the Imperial Trans-Antarctic Expedition. The crewmen were stranded on Elephant Island, an ice-covered mountainous island off the coast of Antarctica in the outer reaches of the South Shetland Islands, in the Southern Ocean.

== Early life ==
Pardo entered the Chilean Naval Pilot's School in July 1900, and joined the Chilean Navy as a pilot third class in June 1906. He was promoted to pilot second class in September 1910, and assigned to the Magallanes Naval Base in southern Chile as captain of the steam tug Yelcho.

== Rescue of Shackleton's crew ==
During the ill-fated Imperial Trans-Antarctic Expedition, Sir Ernest Shackleton's ship Endurance became trapped in the ice of the Weddell Sea in January 1915. On 27 October, nine months later, the ship was crushed by the ice and sank. Shackleton and his crew of 28 made their way by foot, sledge and lifeboats to Elephant Island in the South Shetland Islands at the northern tip of the Antarctic Peninsula facing South America.

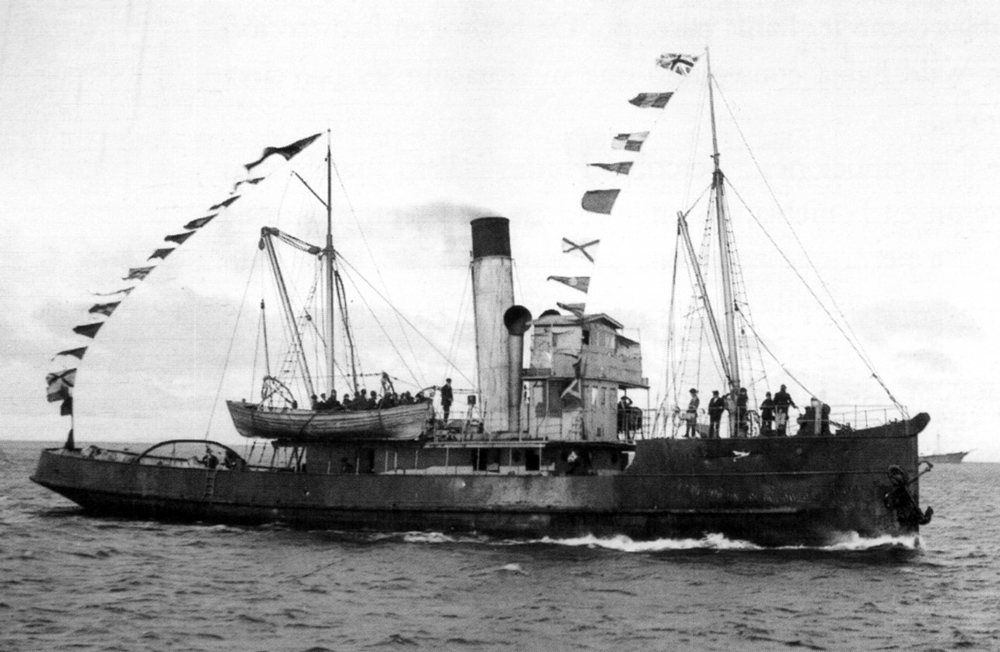
Yelcho three years earlier, c. 1913

On 24 April 1916, Shackleton and five of his men began an epic 800-mile (1,300 km) open-boat voyage to the Island of South Georgia, leaving the remaining 22 men behind on Elephant Island while he sought help to rescue them. After three futile attempts using the ships Southern Sky (loaned by the English Whaling Co, 23–31 May 1916), the ship Instituto de Pesca N°1 (loaned by the Government of Uruguay, 10–16 June 1916) and Emma (a sealer, funded by the British Club, Punta Arenas, 12 July – 8 August 1916) to rescue the men left on Elephant Island, the Yelcho—a 36.5-metre (120 ft) steam tug commanded by Pardo was authorised by the president of Chile, Juan Luis Sanfuentes, to escort and tow Emma. When the third attempt with Emma failed, the Chilean Government decided to send Yelcho alone, although it was totally unsuitable for Antarctic conditions, lacking a proper radio, heating, or a double hull.

On 25 August 1916, with Shackleton aboard, Pardo sailed from Punta Arenas on the Strait of Magellan. By then, the Antarctic winter was at its height, and ice conditions were difficult as the Yelcho neared Elephant Island. However, on 30 August, the 22 men were rescued. They arrived back in Punta Arenas on 3 September to a hero's welcome. For his rescue feat, Pardo was immediately promoted to pilot first class and given several civilian medals and naval honours, as well as credit for ten years of service.

== Later life ==
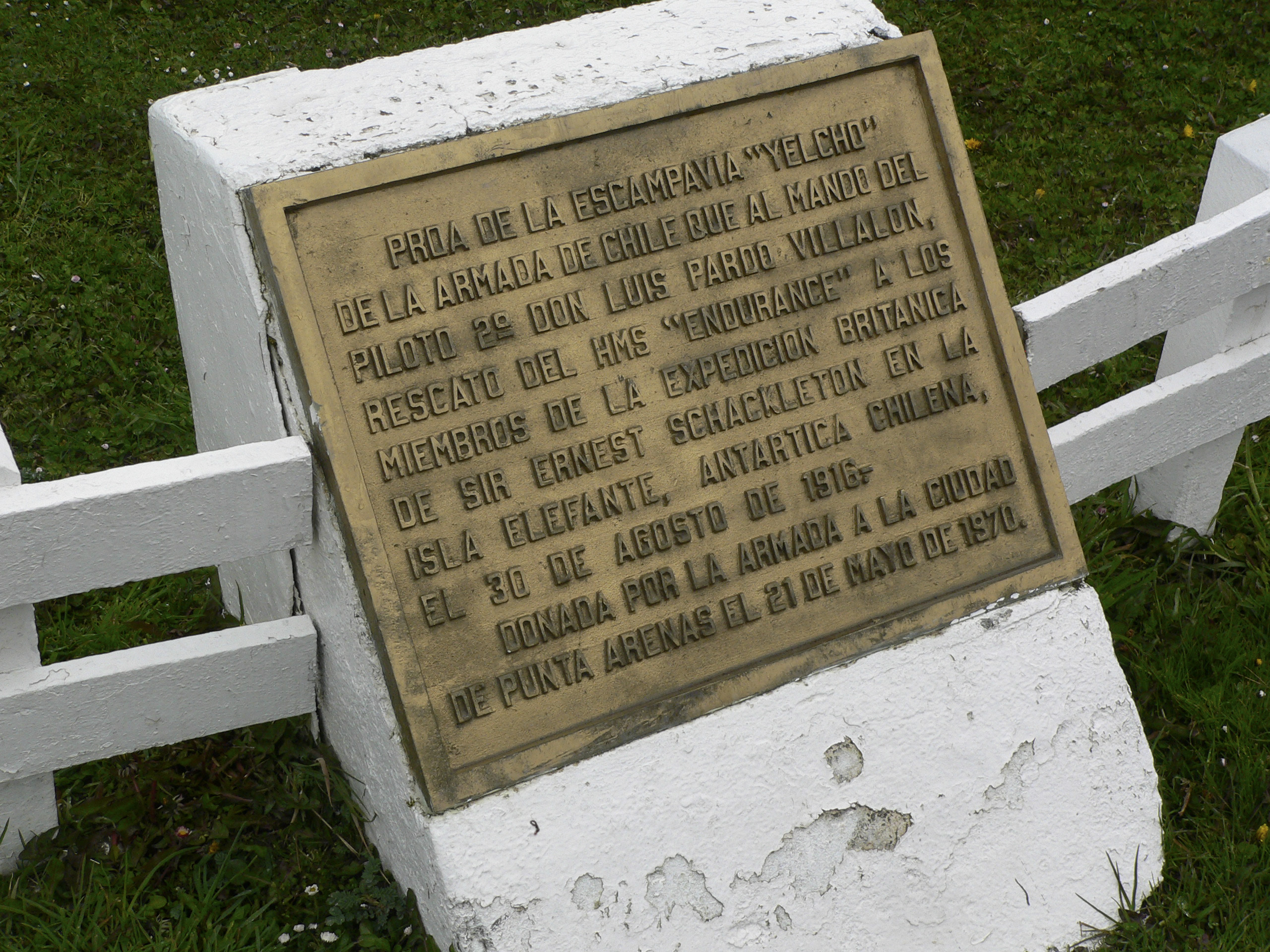
Honorary plaque in Puerto Williams

Pardo retired from the Navy in 1919. The British government authorized a large monetary award, which he turned down, stating that he was simply fulfilling a mission assigned to him by the Chilean Navy.

In 1930, he was appointed Chilean consul at Liverpool, where he served until 1934. He died of bronchopneumonia on 21 February 1935, aged 52.

== Legacy ==
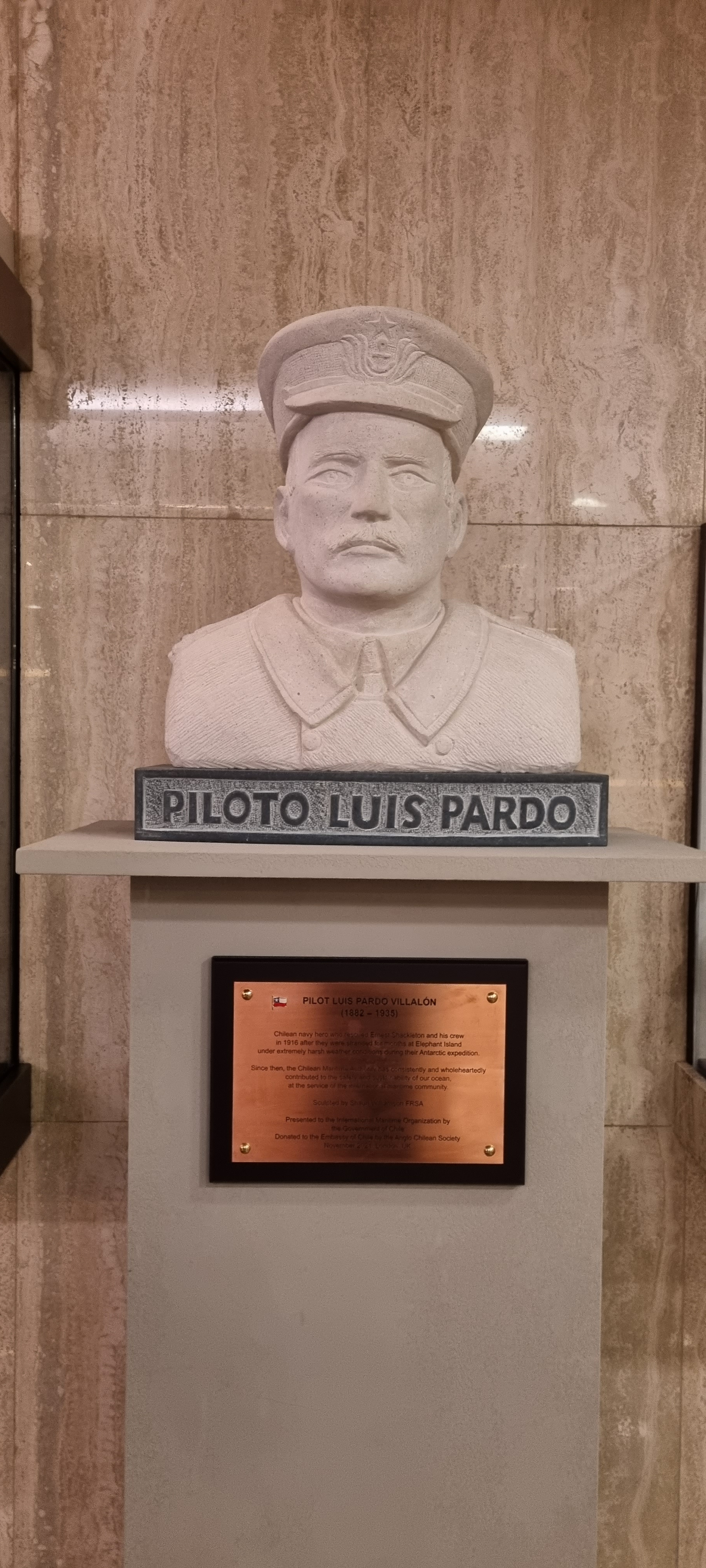
Memorial to Luis Pardo at the International Maritime Organization

Pardo Ridge, the highest portion of Elephant Island, was named after him, and a cape on the northern tip of the Island was given the name Yelcho. The bow of the Yelcho is on display at Puerto Williams, a Chilean naval base on the Beagle Channel, and a bust of Captain Pardo has been placed at the site of the Endurance crew's camp on Elephant Island.

Pardo has a memorial statue and plaque in the main lobby of the International Maritime Organization. Pardo has a statue pointing to Antarctica, next to the prow of Yelcho, on the waterfront of the southern port of Punta Arenas.

Two Chilean naval vessels have been named in his honour:

- Piloto Pardo, an Antarctic supply ship commissioned in 1959
- Piloto Pardo, an OPV-80 class offshore patrol vessel commissioned in 2008

== Bibliography ==
- Child, J. (1988). Antarctica and South American Geopolitics: Frozen Lebensraum. New York: Praeger.
- Mericq, L. (1987). Antarctica: Chile's Claim. Washington: National Defense University.
- Pinochet, O. (1976). La Antarctica Chilena. Santiago: Andrés Bello.
