= Guépratte Island =

Island of Antarctica

Coordinates: 64°29′30″S 62°59′30″W

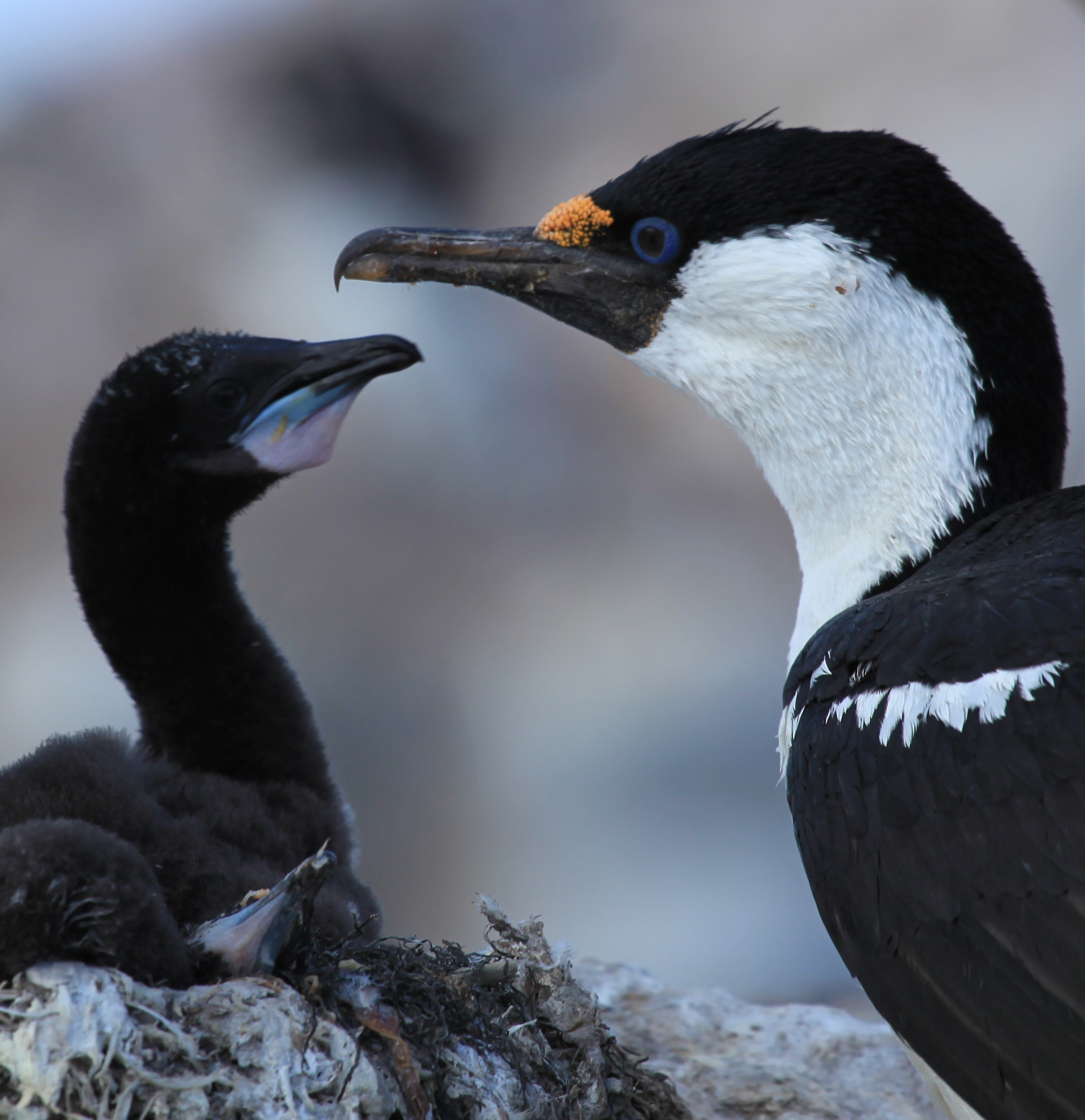
Antarctic shags breed in the IBA

Guépratte Island is an ice-covered island 2.8 km (1.7 mi) long, lying between Anvers Island and Brabant Island at the east side of the entrance to Fournier Bay, in the Palmer Archipelago, Antarctica. The island was first shown on the Ludwig Friederichsen map of 1895, embodying the 1873–74 explorations of a German expedition under Eduard Dallmann. It was later charted by the French Antarctic Expedition, 1903–05, under Jean-Baptiste Charcot, who named it after Captain Guépratte of the French Navy. The name "Discovery Island", applied in 1927 by Discovery Investigations personnel on the Discovery, has been rejected in favour of the earlier name.

== Important Bird Area ==
A small (7 ha) islet lying about 1.5 km to the east of Guépratte has been identified as an Important Bird Area (IBA) by BirdLife International because it supports a breeding colony of Antarctic shags, with about 220 pairs recorded there in 1987.

== See also ==
- List of Antarctic and subantarctic islands
