= Dougherty Island =

Phantom South Pacific island

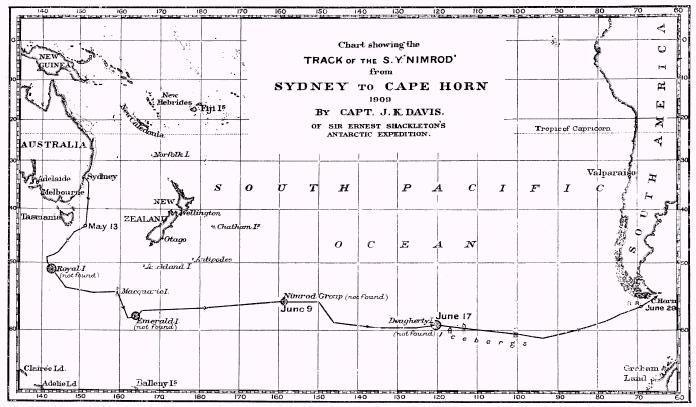
1909 search for Dougherty and other phantom islands

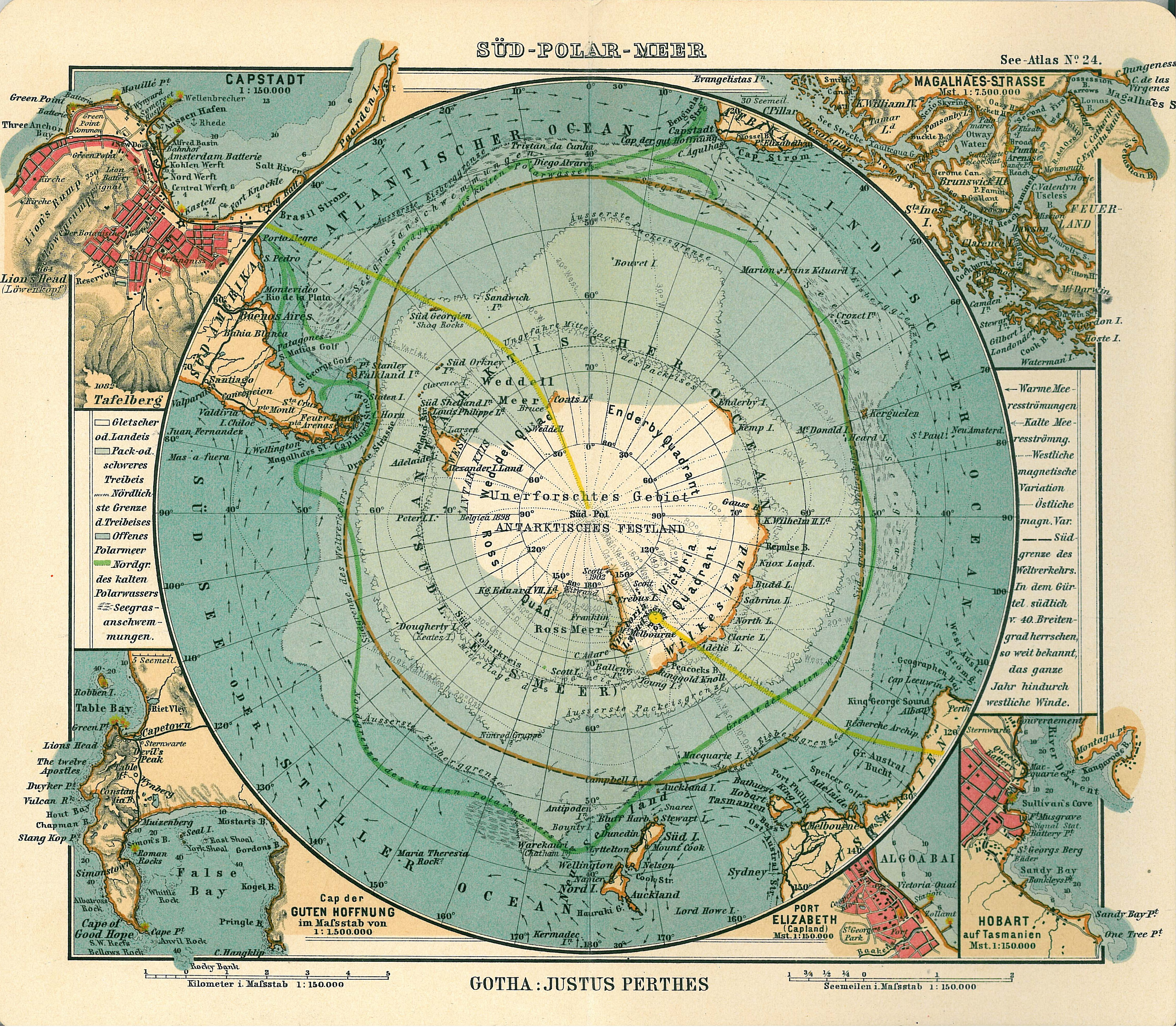
1906 German map showing Dougherty Island (below left of center, near 60°S, 120°W)

Dougherty is the name of a phantom island that was believed to be located in the extreme south of the Pacific Ocean, roughly halfway between Cape Horn and New Zealand. It was named after Captain Daniel Dougherty of the James Stewart, an Irish whaler, who in 1841 reported discovering it at 59°20′S 120°20′W. He described it as 5–6 miles long with a high bluff to the northeast and covered in snow. Dougherty's discovery was confirmed by Captain Keates of the Louise in 1860, giving its coordinates as 59°20′S 120°18′W, and by Captain Stannard of the Cingalese in 1886, giving the location as 59°21′S 119°7′W.

However, thorough exploration of the area in the late 19th and early 20th centuries established that the island does not exist. Captain Davis of the Nimrod suggested that the most likely explanation was that Dougherty, Keates, and Stannard had all been deceived by fog banks or icebergs (none, after all, claimed to have actually landed on the island): "I am inclined to think Dougherty Island has melted."

The island continued to appear on maps as late as 1934.

== See also ==
- Royal Company's Islands
- Emerald Island (phantom)
- Nimrod Islands
- Sandy Island, New Caledonia, a phantom island that remained on many maps until the early 21st century
