= Douglas Peak (Antarctica) =

Peak in Antarctica

Douglas Peak (66°24′S 52°28′E) is a peak in Antarctica, 1,525 metres (5,000 ft) high, lying 11 nautical miles (20 km) southwest of Mount Codrington and 8 nautical miles (15 km) east of Mount Marr. It was discovered in January 1930 by the British Australian New Zealand Antarctic Research Expedition under Mawson, and named for Flight Lieutenant E. Douglas, Royal Australian Air Force, a pilot with the expedition.

== See also ==
- McDonald Ridge, ice-covered ridge between Johnston Peak and Douglas Peak
