= Adventure Life =

Adventure travel company

Adventure Life is an American adventure travel company offering private tailormade trips, small group tours, and expedition voyages throughout the world. From their beginnings as a Latin America specialist in South America and Central America land tours, they have grown to now offer trips around the globe including less conventional destinations such as Africa, the Arctic, Antarctica and Alaska.

Their focus is nature, cultural, and active travel, and they apply ecotourism principles to their tours and screen all cruise and land partners abroad for these principles. A large portion of travelers arrange customized or private itineraries. Since their founding in 1999, over 40,000 clients have traveled with the company.

Adventure Life is registered in the State of Montana as ALJ, Inc., and they do business as Adventure Life.

== History ==
Adventure Life was founded by Brian Morgan in 1999. Morgan was working as a consultant in Quito for CARE in the late 1990s, but decided to return home to Montana. While applying for jobs in Montana, Morgan planned a group tour back to Ecuador and promoted it locally. This experience made him recognize that guided tours were a service in demand, and a niche industry that his own travel experiences and Ecuadorian connections had prepared him to explore further.

Adventure Life launched in February 1999 with Spanish language study-trips, internships, and tours to Peru and Ecuador. Office was initially located in Havre, Montana, and Morgan hired the first staff member. During the first year of business, Adventure Life had fewer than 100 travelers.

Starting in 2000, the company decided to focus on only offering tours and no longer provides Spanish language study-trips or internships. The office moved from Havre and settled in Missoula, Montana. By the end of 2000, the company hired four full-time staff members. The company established a partner office in Lima, Peru.

Between 2001 and 2003, Adventure Life added tours to Bolivia, Costa Rica and Belize, Chile, Argentina, Patagonia and Guatemala. The company also established a second partner office in Quito, Ecuador. The company moved from Morgan's home into its first office. In 2005, tours started sending travelers to Antarctica, and in 2006 they added Panama to the list of destinations. The growing company moved into its own new construction building on Spruce Street in Missoula in 2012, and started to move towards remote operations in 2019 which was ultimately realized as a result of the pandemic in 2020. The company now has employees and contractors from around the globe.

During 2007 and 2008, Adventure Life began offering small-ship cruises throughout the world. A variety of destinations in Latin America are launched over the next five years including Nicaragua, Uruguay, Mexico, Colombia and Brazil. In 2013 tours throughout the south Africa nations are launched as well. The company continued to expand its offerings to SE Asia, China, Iceland and Europe. In 2020 as a response to the COVID pandemic, Adventure Life took care of its travelers by securing rebooking credits and refunds for its travelers and started to arrange tours to certain destinations with multiple layers of testing requirements and other safety precautions as early as October 2020. The company continued to expand its offering to include Mississippi SE Asia river cruises and land tours into the Mediterranean region including Italy, Croatia, and Greece during 2021 and 2022 and continues to expand to offer new exciting destinations each year. 2024 held launches of New Zealand and Greenland tours as well as 'remodels' of tours in existing regions and 2025 of Japan, Australia, and the Scandinavian countries.

== Awards and mentions ==
- 2016, 2015, 2014, 2013, 2012, & 2011 Travel + Leisure A-List: Top Travel Advisor. Awarded to founder, Brian Morgan, as the go-to travel advisor for Peru and Galapagos tours.
- 2015, 2014 Inc. 5000 Fastest Growing Companies
- 2015 National Geographic Tours of a Lifetime featuring Undiscovered Brazil tour
- 2014 Travel Age West Top Travel Agents in the West. Awarded to founder, Brian Morgan, as the go-to travel advisor for Galapagos tours.
- 2013, 2012, 2010, & 2009 Best Places to Work, Outside Magazine
- 2013 Travel Weekly Magellan Award
- 2013 USA Today Adventure Travel: Top new trips to emerging places
- 2011 Outside Magazine Travel Hot List featuring Machu Picchu
- 2010 National Geographic Traveler: Tours of a Lifetime featuring Bolivia tours
- 2008 Employer of Choice winner, Missoula Job Service Employer's Council
- 2007 Best Adventure Travel Companies on Earth, National Geographic Adventure
- 2007 Best in Travel Class, Transitions Abroad
- 2007 Trip of the Year, Outside Magazine
- 2006 Green List Honoree, Conde Nast Traveler
- 2006 Best Trips, Outside Magazine,

== Media References ==
Adventure Life has been featured in major publications such as USA Today, The New York Times, National Geographic Adventure, Outside Forbes Life, Condé Nast Traveler, and Inc. Magazine.
