= Yelcho (1906 tug) =

Chilean tug that rescued Shackleton's men

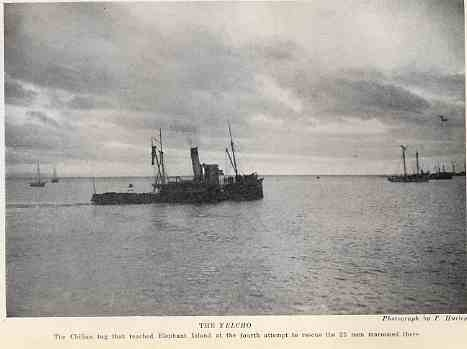
- Yelcho

History

Chile
- Name: Yelcho
- Owner: 1906–1908 Sociedad Ganadera e Industrial Yelcho y Palena de Puerto Montt; 1908–1958 Chilean Navy; 1958–1962 Astilleros y Maestranzas de la Armada (ASMAR)
- Builder: George Brown & Company Greenock, Yard No 34, Engines by Muir & Houston, Glasgow
- Launched: 23 June 1906
- Commissioned: 1908 (Navy)
- Decommissioned: 1945 (Navy)
- Reinstated: 1945-1958 as tender
- Honours and awards: Rescue of the Endurance crew of Ernest Henry Shackleton (1916)
- Fate: Scrapped 1965
- Notes: Bow preserved in Punta Arenas

General characteristics
- Tonnage: 219 GRT
- Displacement: 467 t
- Length: 120 ft (37 m)
- Beam: 23 ft (7.0 m)
- Depth: 9.9 ft (3.0 m)
- Installed power: 350 ihp (260 kW)
- Propulsion: compound steam engine by Muir & Houston Ltd, Glasgow
- Speed: 10 knots (19 km/h; 12 mph)
- Crew: 22 men
- Armament: 1 Hotchkiss 37 mm cannon
- Notes: There are two other Yelchos in the Chilean Navy, Chilean tug Yelcho (AGS-64) and Yelcho (1971).

Yelcho was a tugboat built in 1906 by the Scottish firm Geo. Brown and Co. of Greenock, on the River Clyde for towage and cargo service of the Chilean Sociedad Ganadera e Industrial Yelcho y Palena, Puerto Montt. In 1908 she was sold to the Chilean Navy and ordered to Punta Arenas as a tug and for periodic maintenance and supply of the lighthouses in that region.

== The rescue of the Imperial Trans-Antarctic Expedition ==
After the dramatic voyage of the James Caird, Ernest Shackleton had attempted and failed three times to rescue the crew left on Elephant Island: the ships Southern Sky (loaned by the English Whaling Co, 23–31 May 1916), Instituto de Pesca N°1 (loaned by the Government of Uruguay, 10–16 June 1916) and Emma (a sealer, funded by the British Club, Punta Arenas, 12 July – 8 August 1916) all failed to reach Elephant Island.

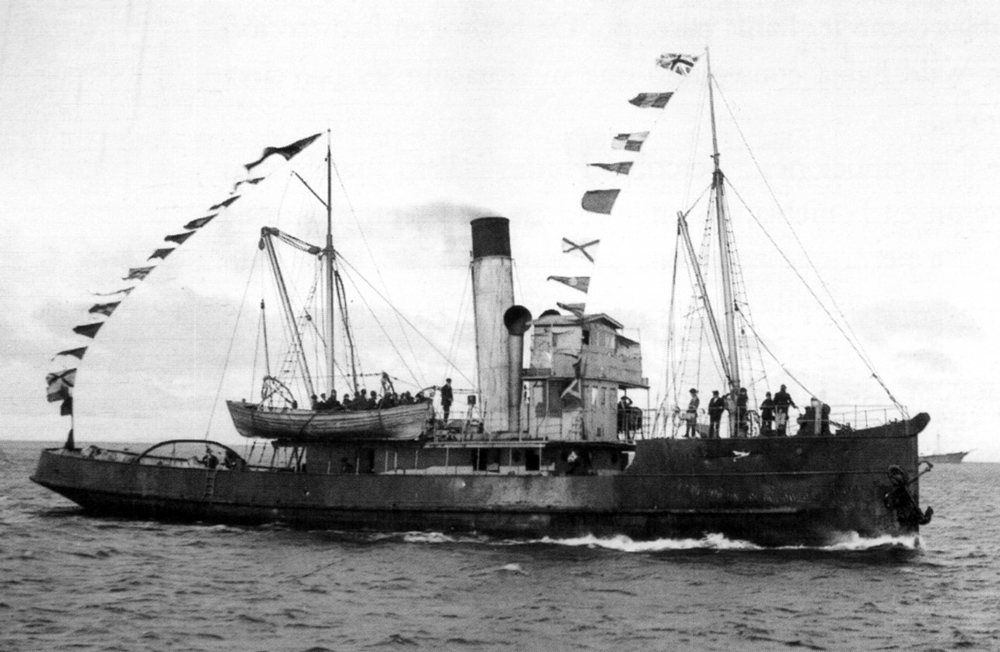
Yelcho circa 1913

In July 1916, Yelcho was authorised by the president of Chile, Juan Luis Sanfuentes, to escort and tow Emma to a point 200 miles (320 km) south of Cape Horn. but this third attempt was also unsuccessful.

At dawn on 7 August Yelcho under the command of Captain Luis Pardo was ordered to Port Stanley in order to tug Emma and the British explorers back to Punta Arenas to make a fourth attempt.

The Chilean government offered Yelcho although she was totally unsuited for operations in Antarctic waters. With no radio, no proper heating system, no electric lighting and no double hull the small ship had to cross the 500 miles (800 km) of the Drake's Passage in Antarctic winter.

On 25 August 1916 at 12:15 am, she sailed bound for Elephant Island with 22 men under command of Pardo, carrying Shackleton, Frank Worsley and Tom Crean. After making it safely through the complex tides and channels of the west side of the Tierra del Fuego, Yelcho headed out into the Beagle Channel.

On the 27th at 11:15 am, she arrived at Picton Island, where she bunkered 300 sacks of coal (a total of 72 tons were in the ship) from the Puerto Banner Naval Station. The process was completed within only 12 hours and on 28 August at 3:30 pm she weighed anchor and left for Elephant Island. 60 miles (97 km) south of Cape Horn the lookout spotted the first icebergs

At 11:40 am on 30 August, the fog lifted and the camp on Elephant Island was spotted, and Yelcho immediately entered the bay. Within an hour, in two trips of a small boat, all the Elephant Island party were safely aboard Yelcho, which sailed for Punta Arenas.

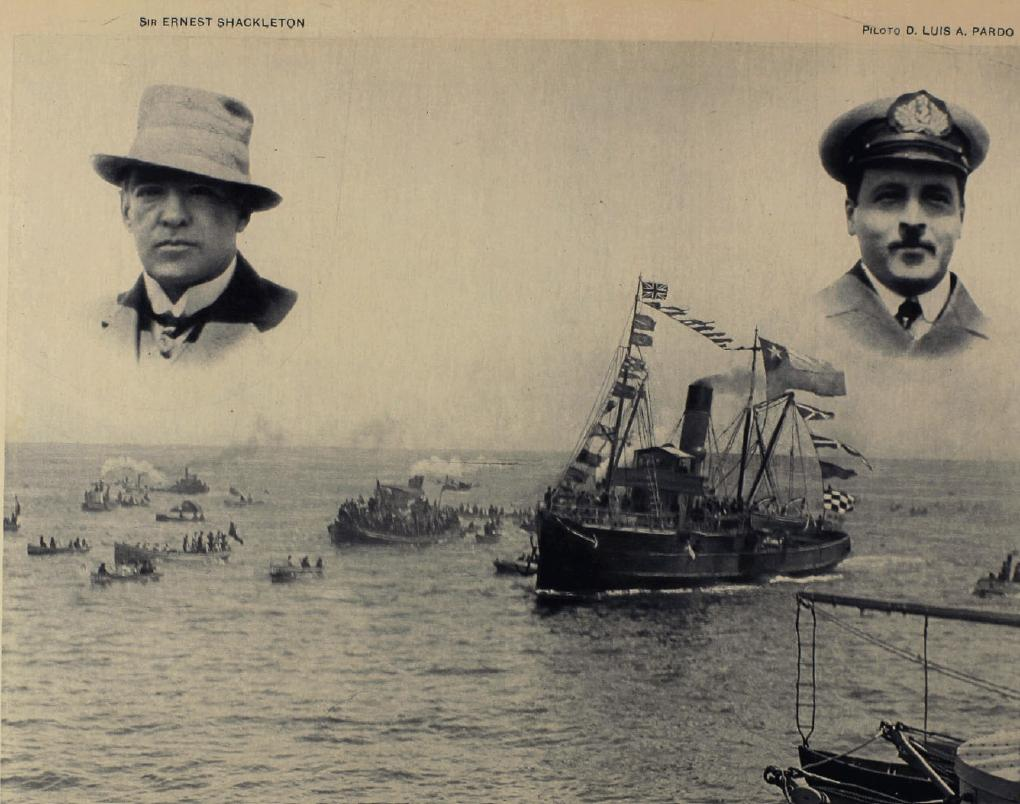
Yelcho, at the left is Ernest Shackleton and Luis Pardo Villalón at the right

The 23 crew of Yelcho at the rescue was:

Crew	Name
Captain	Luis Alberto Pardo Villalón
2nd in Command	León Aguirre Romero
Chief Engineer	Jorge L. Valenzuela Mesa
2nd Engineer	Jose Beltrán Gamarra
Engineers	Nicolás Muñoz Molina, Manuel Blackwood
Firemen	Herbito Cariz Caramo, Juan Vera Jara, Pedro Chaura, Pedro Soto Nuñez, Luis Contreras Castro
Guard	Manuel Ojeda, Ladislao Gallego Trujillo, Hipólito Aries, José Leiva Chacón, Antonio Colin Parada
Foreman	José Muñoz Tellez
Blacksmith	Froilan Cabana Rodríguez
Seamen	Pedro Pairo, José del Carmen Galindo, Florentino González Estay, Clodomiro Aguero Soto
Cabin Boy	Bautista Ibarra Carvajal

== Aftermath ==
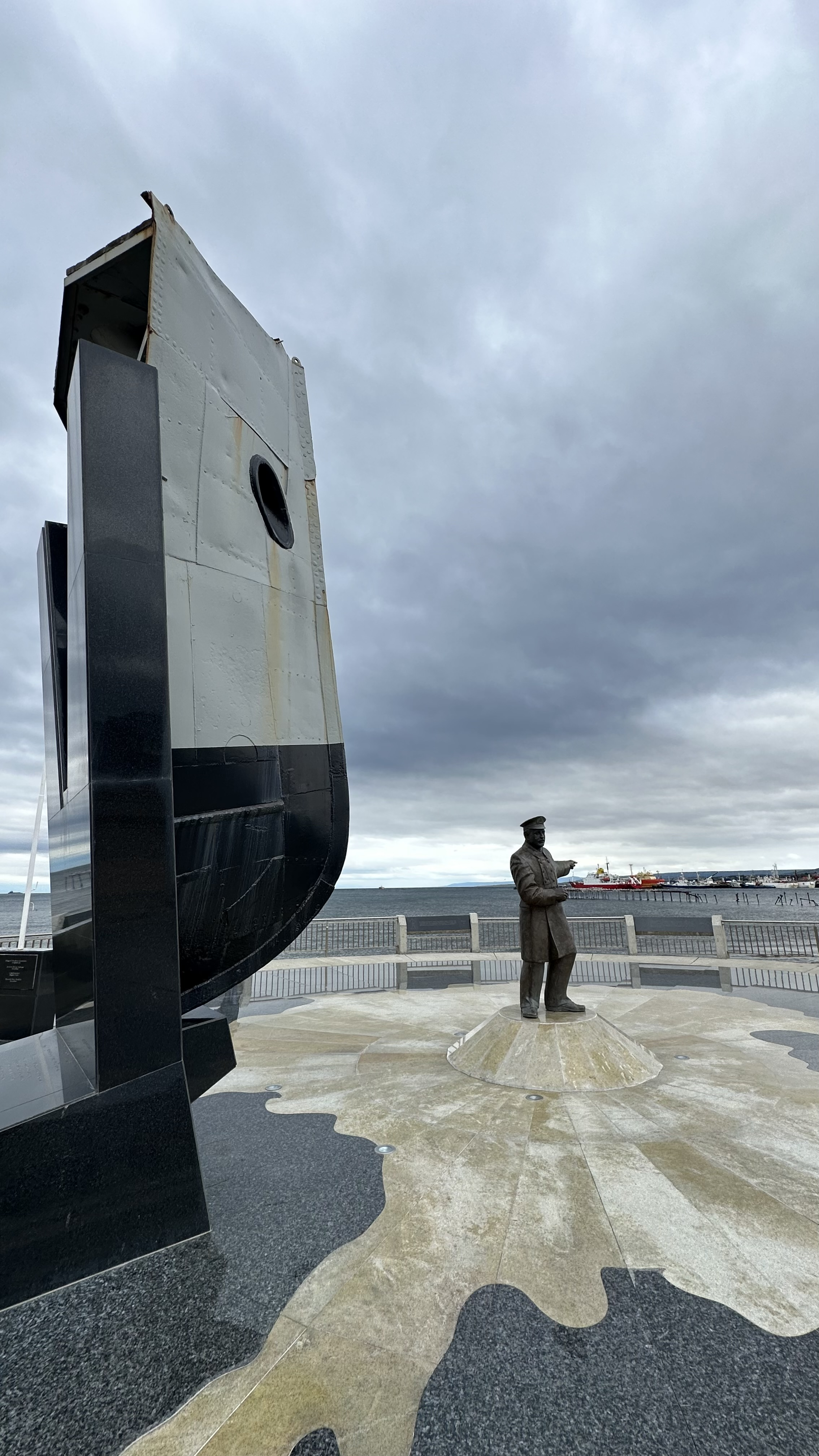
Prow of the Yelcho and statue of Pardo in Punta Arenas preserved as a monument

After the successful rescue mission of 1916 the name Yelcho has been given to streets and ships of Chile, particularly to Chile's southernmost city Puerto Williams, and it was there that the prow of the Yelcho had been preserved and prominently displayed as a tribute to Captain Pardo's ship and crew from 1972 to 2016. In 2016, the bow was removed and replaced with a replica. The original bow is now part of a monument to Luis Pardo Villalón, which was unveiled on the waterfront of Punta Arenas on 18 December 2020.

In 1945, the ship was decommissioned and used as tender in the Petty officer School of the Chilean Navy. On 27 January 1958 Yelcho was retired by decree 190 and in 1962 sold to ASMAR under terms of Law 14.564 (5 May 1954) for 300,000 CLP.

== See also ==
List of Antarctic exploration ships from the Heroic Age, 1897–1922
