= Cape Ann (Enderby Land) =

Headland in Enderby Land, Antarctica

Coordinates: 66°10′S 51°22′E

Cape Ann is a cape on the coast of East Antarctica, surmounted by Mount Biscoe rising to a peak of 700 metres.

It was first photographed from the air in December 1929 during a Norwegian expedition led by explorer and aviator Hjalmar Riiser-Larsen. Less than a month later, the British Australian New Zealand Antarctic Research Expedition led by Douglas Mawson photographed the cape from their ship Discovery (the ship used by Robert Falcon Scott for his first Antarctic expedition, 1901–1904). Both expeditions concluded that the cape and mountain were those sighted during February and March 1831 by John Biscoe's Antarctic expedition and given the name Cape Ann, probably after Biscoe's wife. Mawson proposed that the cape retain the name Cape Ann and the mountain be named Mount Biscoe.

The mountain has a distinctive sharp black peak. Its position was fixed by an ANARE survey party in 1957.

== See also ==
- Latham Peak
