= John Biscoe =

British mariner, trader and explorer

John Biscoe (28 April 1794 – 1843) was an English mariner and explorer who commanded the first expedition known to have sighted the areas named Enderby Land and Graham Land along the coast of Antarctica. The expedition also found a number of islands in the vicinity of Graham Land, including the Biscoe Islands that were named after him.

== Early life ==
Biscoe was born in Enfield, Middlesex, England. In March 1812, aged seventeen, he joined the Royal Navy and served during the 1812–1815 war against the United States. By the time of his discharge in 1815, he had become a justice Master. Thereafter he sailed on board merchant shipping as a mate or master, mostly to the East or West Indies.

== Southern Ocean expedition, 1830–1833 ==
In 1830, the whaling company Samuel Enderby & Sons appointed Biscoe master of the brig Tula and leader of an expedition to find new sealing grounds in the Southern Ocean. Accompanied by the cutter Lively, the Tula left London and by December had reached the South Shetland Islands. The expedition then sailed further south, crossing the Antarctic Circle on 22 January 1831, before turning east at 60°S.

A month later, on 24 February 1831, the expedition sighted bare mountain tops through the ocean ice. Biscoe correctly surmised that they were part of a continent and named the area Enderby Land in honour of his patrons. On 28 February, a headland was spotted, which Biscoe named Cape Ann; the mountain atop the headland would later be named Mount Biscoe. Biscoe kept the expedition in the area while he began to chart the coastline, but after a month his and his crews' health were deteriorating. The expedition sailed toward Australia, reaching Hobart, Tasmania in May, but not before two crew members had died from scurvy.

The expedition wintered in Hobart before heading back toward the Antarctic. On 15 February 1832, Adelaide Island was discovered and two days later the Biscoe Islands. A further four days later, on 21 February, more extensive coastline was spotted. Surmising again that he had encountered a continent, Biscoe named the area "Graham Land", after First Lord of the Admiralty Sir James Graham. Biscoe landed on Anvers Island and claimed to have sighted the mainland of the Antarctic continent.

Biscoe again began charting the new coastline the expedition had found and by the end of April 1832 he had become the third man (after James Cook and Fabian von Bellingshausen) to circumnavigate the Antarctic continent. On the journey home, in July, the Lively was wrecked at the Falkland Islands. The expedition nonetheless returned to London safely by the beginning of 1833.

In 1833, Biscoe was again commissioned by Samuel Enderby & Sons to make another voyage of exploration. However, he resigned from the effort, probably because of his health. He instead engaged in the West Indies trade in a much warmer climate. He next took part in sailing ventures in Australian waters.

John Biscoe died at sea in 1843 while on a voyage to bring his family from Tasmania back to England. He was 49 years old.

== Memorials ==
A group of islands and a mountain are named for him. The Biscoe Islands were discovered off the west coast of Graham Land in February 1832, during his Antarctic circumnavigation aboard Tula and Lively. Mount Biscoe is a distinctive 700m black peak, the high point of Cape Ann in East Antarctica. Discovered by Hjalmar Riiser-Larsen (by air in 1929) and Mawson (1930), it is thought to have been seen by Biscoe in 1831.

Two British research ships have been named in his honour. After conversion to an ice-strengthened research ship for the Falkland Islands Dependencies Survey, HMS Pretext was renamed RRS John Biscoe (1944). She reverted to RRS Pretext in 1956, to allow the name to be used for RRS John Biscoe (1956), a new ship with a longer range and greater cargo-carrying capacity.

== Bibliography ==
- John Biscoe, edited George Murray, From the Journal of a Voyage towards the South Pole on board the brig Tula, under the command of John Biscoe, with the cutter Lively in company, Royal Geographical Society, London: 1901.
