= Melchior Harbour =

Melchior Harbor (64°19′S 62°59′W) is a small harbour in the Melchior Islands, Palmer Archipelago, Antarctica, formed by the semi-circular arrangement of Delta, Alpha, Beta, Kappa and Gamma Islands. The name, derived from the name of the island group, was probably given by Discovery Investigations personnel who roughly surveyed the harbour in 1927. The harbour was later surveyed by Argentine expeditions in 1942, 1943 and 1948.
