= Pabellón Island =

Island in Palmer Archipelago, Antarctica

- Location within Antarctica

Geography
- Location: Antarctica
- Coordinates: 64°19′S 62°57′W
- Archipelago: Melchior Islands; Palmer Archipelago

Administration
- Administered under the Antarctic Treaty System

Demographics
- Population: 0

Pabellón Island is the southernmost of two islands which lie close off the north tip of Omega Island and mark the south side of the western entrance to Andersen Harbor in the Melchior Islands, Palmer Archipelago. The island was roughly surveyed by DI personnel in 1927 and named by the Argentine expedition during a survey of these islands in 1946–47. They erected a mast on this island from which they flew the Argentine national colors (pabellón).

== See also ==
- Composite Antarctic Gazetteer
- List of Antarctic and sub-Antarctic islands
- List of Antarctic islands south of 60° S
- SCAR
- Territorial claims in Antarctica
