= Tripod Island =

Island in Palmer Archipelago, Antarctica

Tripod
- Location within Antarctica

Geography
- Location: Antarctica
- Coordinates: 64°19′S 62°57′W
- Archipelago: Melchior Islands, Palmer Archipelago

Administration
- Administered under the Antarctic Treaty System

Demographics
- Population: 0

Tripod Island is a small island which lies close south of the west extremity of Eta Island and marks the north side of the western entrance to Andersen Harbor in the Melchior Islands, Palmer Archipelago. The name was probably given by DI personnel who roughly surveyed the island in 1927. The island was resurveyed by Argentine expeditions in 1942, 1943 and 1948.

== See also ==
- Composite Antarctic Gazetteer
- List of Antarctic and sub-Antarctic islands
- List of Antarctic islands south of 60° S
- SCAR
- Territorial claims in Antarctica
