= Bills Point =

Coordinates: 64°19′S 62°59′W

Bills Point is a headland marking the south extremity of Delta Island in the Melchior Islands, Palmer Archipelago. The name was probably given by DI personnel who roughly charted Delta Island in 1927. The feature was surveyed by Argentine expeditions in 1942, 1943 and 1948.

== See also ==
- Harpun Rocks
