= Omicron Islands =

Group of islands in Antarctica

- Location in Antarctica

Geography
- Location: Antarctica
- Coordinates: 64°21′S 62°55′W

Administration
- Administered under the Antarctic Treaty System

Demographics
- Population: Uninhabited

Omicron Islands is a group of small islands and rocks which lie close southeast of Omega Island in the Melchior Islands, Palmer Archipelago. The name, derived from the 15th letter of the Greek alphabet, appears to have been first used on a 1946 Argentine government chart following surveys of these islands by Argentine expeditions in 1942 and 1943.

== See also ==
- List of Antarctic and sub-Antarctic islands
