= Yoke (disambiguation) =

A yoke is a device borne across the shoulders of animals or humans, for example to harness draught animals together, or to assist humans (see carrying pole) in transporting heavy or awkward burdens.

Yoke may also refer to:

- Yoke (aeronautics), the "wheel" that controls the ailerons and elevator on aircraft
- Yoke (unit of measurement) used in the time of the Domesday Book for tax purposes in Kent
- Yoke (clothing), part of the construction of a garment
- Yoke (Lake District), a high point in Cumbria, England
- Yoke Island, Palmer Archipelago, Antarctica
- Yoke language, spoken by about 200 people in Papua, Indonesia
- Deflection yoke, a device to divert the electron beam in a cathode ray tube
- Scotch yoke, a mechanism converting rotary motion to reciprocating motion or vice versa
- Six pack yoke, a plastic holder for beverage cans
- "Yoke", a song by Basement from their 2011 album I Wish I Could Stay Here
- Yoke, part of a motorcycle fork
- A nickname given by hobbyists for Yokomo
- A connector used in a stage lighting instrument
- Ring yoke, the frame to which magnets are attached in a field coil
- SCUBA diving yoke, an A-clamp connector
- A nuclear test in Operation Sandstone
- A slang term for the drug MDMA, better known as "ecstasy"
- A mounting strap used to secure a wiring device to an electrical box

== See also ==
- Yokes (disambiguation)
- Yolk, the nutrient-bearing portion of an egg
