= West Melchior Islands =

Island group in Palmer Archipelago, Antarctica

- Location on the Antarctic Peninsula

Geography
- Location: Melchior Islands
- Coordinates: 64°19′S 63°0′W
- Archipelago: Palmer Archipelago

West Melchior Islands (64°19′S 63°0′W) is a group of small ice-covered islands and rocks which lie west of The Sound in the Melchior Islands, Palmer Archipelago. The islands east of The Sound are called East Melchior Islands. The name was probably given by DI personnel who roughly surveyed these islands in 1927. The islands were surveyed by Argentine expeditions in 1942, 1943 and 1948.

== See also ==
- List of Antarctic and sub-Antarctic islands
