= Melchior Base =

Melchior Base Estación Melchior
- Antarctic station
- Base Melchior
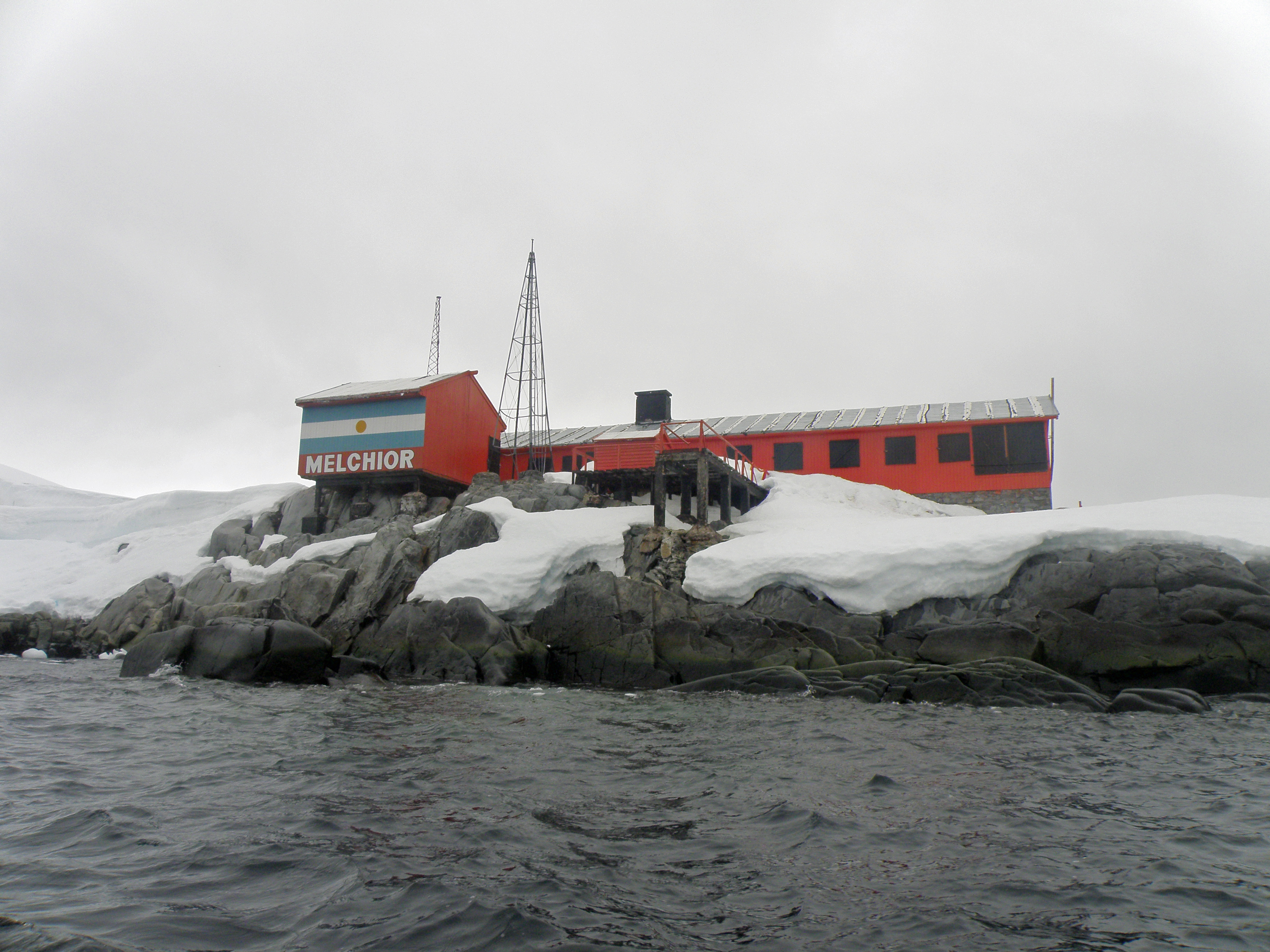
- Melchior Base, February 2010

- Location of Melchior Station in Antarctica
- Coordinates: 64°19′33″S 62°58′36″W
- Country: Argentina
- Province: Tierra del Fuego, Antarctica, and South Atlantic Islands Province
- Department: Antártida Argentina
- Region: Palmer Archipelago; Bellingshausen Sea; Antarctic Peninsula
- Location: Gamma Island; Melchior Islands; Dallmann Bay
- Established: March 31, 1947 (1946–47 austral summer season)

Government
  - Type: Directorate
  - Body: Dirección Nacional del Antártico
  - Operator: Instituto Antártico Argentino
- Elevation: 4 m (13 ft)

Population (2017)
  - Summer: 12
  - Winter: 0
- Time zone: UTC-3 (ART)
- Type: Summer-only
- Status: Active and operational
- Activities: Botany
- Facilities: List: Main house; Personnel house; Laboratory; Warehouse and deposits

Melchior Base (Spanish: Base Melchior or, seldom, Estación Melchior) is an Argentine Antarctic base and scientific research station. It is located on Gamma Island (which the Argentines call Isla Observatorio), Melchior Islands, Dallmann Bay, in Palmer Archipelago on Bellingshausen Sea, Antarctic Peninsula.

It is Argentina's second historical Antarctic base, after the 1904 establishment of the Orcadas Naval Detachment, the world's first—and oldest—permanent settlement in Antarctica.

As of 2014 Melchior is one of 13 research bases in Antarctica operated by Argentina. From 1947 to 1961 it served as a permanent base; since then it is open during the summer season only.

== History ==
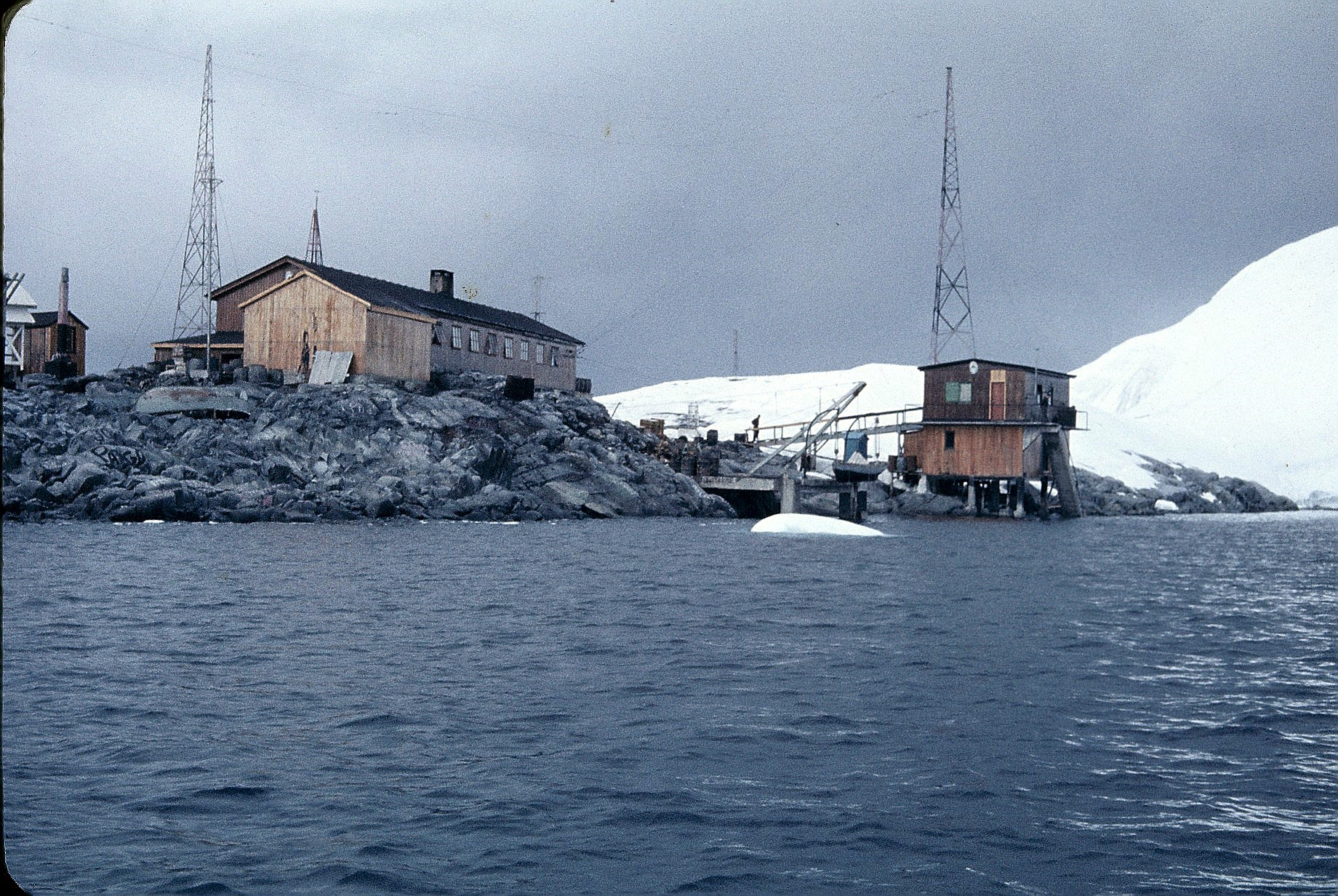
Original wooden facilities at Melchior, January 1958

In January 1942 the Argentine Navy transport ARA Primero de Mayo, commanded by then Frigate Captain Alberto J. Oddera, departed from Buenos Aires with the mission of studying the western coast of the Antarctic Peninsula, especially the area of the Melchior and Argentine Islands. In the former the expedition built a lighthouse and daybeacon.

The archipelago was visited again the following year to continue with the cartographic work and to do maintenance duties on the lighthouse. Three years later, in 1946, the National Antarctic Commission sponsored a new exploration trip.

This new expedition sailed away from the continent in January 1947, led by then Frigate Captain Luis M. García. It was made up of the light transports Patagonia and Chaco, the patrol ships ARA King and ARA Murature, the tanker Ministro Ezcurra and the whaler Don Samuel. The expedition arrived in Observatorio Island on the last day of 1947, and set up a hydrographic camp and basic astronomical observatory at Punta Gallows.

It took 47 days of labor to dynamite the rock, lay down the groundwork for the radio antennae and build the main house: a semi-prefabricated building 27 m (89 ft) long and 7.50 m (24.6 ft) wide, with thermally insulated double walls and ceilings. It had a water boiler, two power generators, batteries and several radio transmitters.

Two 25 m (82 ft) high antennae made possible to communicate with Buenos Aires through radio telegraphy. They also erected four 18 m (59 ft) towers for the 100 m (330 ft) per side rhombic antenna.

The crew unloaded 300 t (300 long tons; 330 short tons) of equipment and supplies, including 150 t (150 long tons; 170 short tons) of coal, a difficult operation due to the high waves and lack of landing beaches. On 31 March 1947 the construction was finished. Patagonia was forced to leave the area as ice began to cover the seas. A brief farewell ceremony was held at the foot of the mast, where Captain García handed command of the new facilities over to Lieutenant Juan A. Nadaud.

In 1952 Melchior became the main source for Antarctic weather forecasts, broadcasting reports three times per day. Larger astronomic facilities were inaugurated in 1955; later, during the 1957–58 International Geophysical Year, the first automatic tide gauge in Antarctica was installed at the base.

On 30 November 1961 Melchior was demoted to summer-only base.

In the austral summer campaign of 1962–63 four Bernardino Rivadavia Natural Sciences Museum scientists conducted marine biology research. Since the summer season of 1968–69 the facilities have been periodically used for this scientific discipline, under commission of the Argentine Naval Hydrographic Service.

== Description ==
Primero de Mayo lighthouse
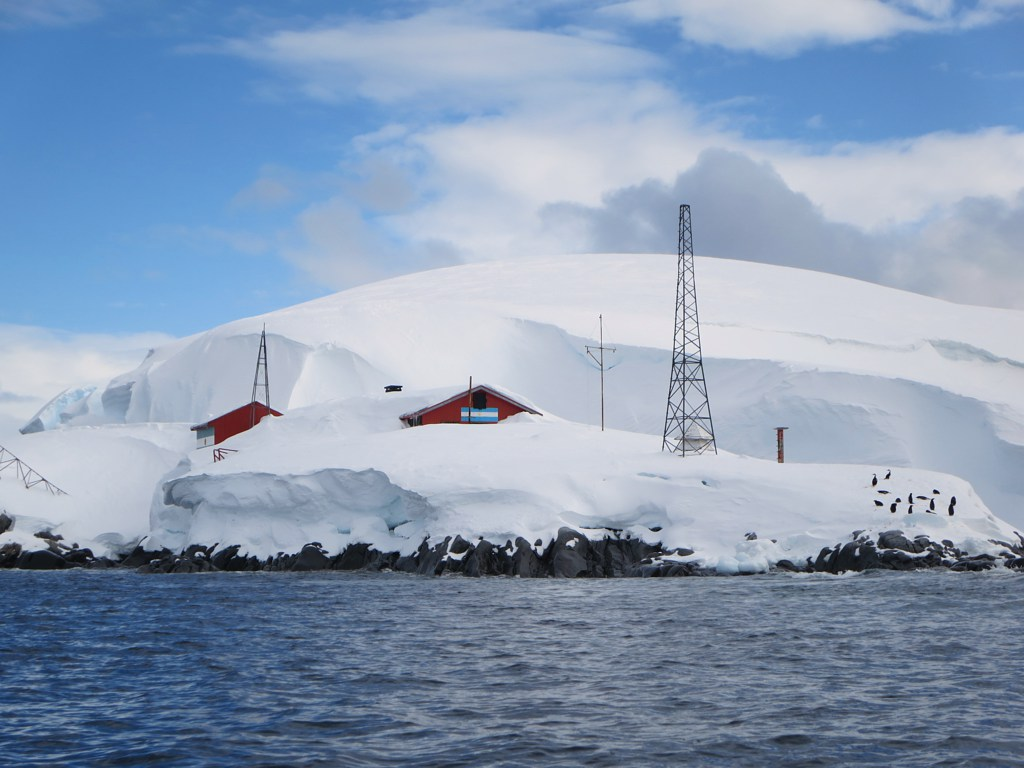
- Primero de Mayo Lighthouse
- Location: Melchior Base; Melchior Islands; Palmer Archipelago; Antarctica
- Coordinates: 64°19′32″S 62°58′34″W

Tower
- Constructed: 1942
- Foundation: Concrete base
- Construction: Metal skeletal tower
- Height: 11 metres (36 ft)
- Shape: Triangular pyramid skeletal tower with light
- Markings: Red tower with orange daymark
- Power source: solar power
- Operator: Argentine Navy
- Heritage: Historic Site or Monument (Antarctica)

Light
- Focal height: 27 metres (89 ft)
- Range: 14.5 nmi (26.9 km; 16.7 mi)
- Characteristic: Fl W s.

Melchior is located 1,205 km (749 mi) from Ushuaia, the nearest port city.

As of 2008 the base is composed of 4 buildings which can house a maximum crew of 15. It has a basic infirmary of 6 m^{2} (65 sq ft) attended by a paramedic.

== Climate ==
The mean annual temperature at Melchior is −3.6 °C (25.5 °F). The absolute maximum temperature recorded was 9.2 °C (48.6 °F) on 30 January 1950, while the absolute minimum was −36.6 °C (−33.9 °F), on 9 August 1958.

== See also ==
- Argentine Antarctica
- List of Antarctic research stations
- List of Antarctic field camps
- List of lighthouses in Antarctica

== Sources ==
- Piñeiro, Armando Alonso (1981). Historia (in Spanish). Vol. 1.
