= Gallows (disambiguation) =

A gallows is a frame, typically wooden, used for execution by hanging.

Gallows may also refer to:

== Film ==
- The Gallows, a 2015 pseudo-documentary found footage film
- The Gallows Act II, the 2019 sequel to the 2015 film

== Music ==
- Gallows (band), a hardcore punk band from Watford, England
  - Gallows (Gallows album), 2012
- Gallows (Blessthefall album), 2025
- "Gallows", a song by Atreyu from the album Congregation of the Damned
- "Gallows", a song by Bleeding Through from the album Nine
- "Gallows", a song by Scale the Summit from the album The Collective
- "Gallows" (song), by the Score featuring Jamie N Commons, 2020

== People ==
- Luke Gallows, the wrestling stage persona of Andrew William Hankinson

=== Fictional characters ===
- Gallows (G.I. Joe), a G.I. Joe character
- Judge Gallows, a fictional character in the fantasy-horror comics anthology series The Unexpected

== Places ==
- Gallows Bay (disambiguation)
- Gallows Corner, London
- Gallows Hill (disambiguation)
- Gallows Island, Bermuda
- Gallows Point, Antarctica
- Gallows Pond, Massachusetts
