= Harpun Rocks =

The Harpun Rocks (64°19′S 62°59′W) are submerged rocks lying 0.1 nautical miles (0.2 km) southeast of Bills Point, Delta Island, in the Melchior Islands of the Palmer Archipelago, Antarctica. The name appears on a chart based upon a 1927 survey by Discovery Investigations personnel, but may reflect an earlier naming by whalers. Harpun is a Norwegian form of the word harpoon.
