= Gallows Point =

Headland in Antarctica

Gallows Point (64°20′S 62°59′W) is the northernmost of two low, parallel points which mark the extremity of Gamma Island in the Melchior Islands, Palmer Archipelago. The name was probably given by Discovery Investigations personnel who roughly surveyed the point in 1927. The point was resurveyed by Argentine expeditions in 1942, 1943 and 1948.
