= Breaker Island =

- Location within Antarctica

Geography
- Location: Antarctica
- Coordinates: 64°46′S 64°07′W
- Archipelago: Palmer Archipelago

Administration
- Administered under the Antarctic Treaty System

Demographics
- Population: Uninhabited

Breaker Island is a small rocky island lying in Arthur Harbour close south-west of Norsel Point, off the south-west coast of Anvers Island in the Palmer Archipelago of Antarctica. It was surveyed by the Falkland Islands Dependencies Survey (FIDS) in 1955 and named by the UK Antarctic Place-Names Committee (UK-APC) because the island causes breakers when the sea is rough.

== Birds ==
The island formed part of the Northern Arthur Harbour Important Bird Area (IBA) number 013, identified as such by BirdLife International because it supports significant seabird breeding colonies. The Arthur Harbour IBA was delisted in 2015.

== See also ==
- List of Antarctic and subantarctic islands
- Breaker Island on the Palmer Station LocalWiki
