= Janus Island =

Island in the Palmer Archipelago

- Location within Antarctica

Geography
- Location: Antarctica
- Coordinates: 64°47′S 64°06′W
- Archipelago: Palmer Archipelago

Administration
- Administered under the Antarctic Treaty System

Demographics
- Population: Uninhabited

Janus Island is a rocky island 370 m (0.2 nmi) long, lying 1 km (0.5 nmi) south of Litchfield Island, off the southwest coast of Anvers Island in the Palmer Archipelago. Janus Island is the southernmost of the islands on the west side of the entrance to Arthur Harbor. Janus Island was named by the United Kingdom Antarctic Place-names Committee (UK-APC) following a survey by the Falkland Islands Dependencies Survey (FIDS) in 1955. The name Janus Island, for the ancient Roman deity Janus who was guardian of gates, arose because of the position of the island at the entrance to Arthur Harbor.

== See also ==
- Composite Antarctic Gazetteer
- List of Antarctic and sub-Antarctic islands
- List of Antarctic islands south of 60° S
- SCAR
- Territorial claims in Antarctica
