= Halfway Island (Palmer Archipelago) =

Island in the Palmer Archipelago

- Location within Antarctica

Geography
- Location: Antarctica
- Coordinates: 64°45′S 64°12′W
- Archipelago: Palmer Archipelago

Administration
- Administered under the Antarctic Treaty System

Demographics
- Population: Uninhabited

Halfway Island is an island lying 4.6 kilometres (2.5 nmi) northwest of Litchfield Island, off the southwest coast of Anvers Island in the Palmer Archipelago. It was surveyed by the British Naval Hydrographic Survey Unit in 1956–1957. The name arose because the island lies halfway between Arthur Harbor and Cape Monaco, a route frequently traveled by boat by members of the Falkland Islands Dependencies Survey (FIDS) at the Arthur Harbor station.

== See also ==
- Composite Antarctic Gazetteer
- List of Antarctic and sub-Antarctic islands
- List of Antarctic islands south of 60° S
- SCAR
- Territorial claims in Antarctica
