= Rho Islands =

Island group in Palmer Archipelago, Antarctica

- Location within Antarctica
- Etymology: Rho, Greek letter

Geography
- Location: Melchior Islands
- Coordinates: 64°17′S 63°0′W
- Archipelago: Palmer Archipelago

Rho Islands is a group of small islands and rocks which lie immediately north of Lambda Island in the Melchior Islands, Palmer Archipelago, Antarctica. The name, derived from the 17th letter of the Greek alphabet, appears to have been first used on a 1946 Argentine government chart following surveys of these islands by Argentine expeditions in 1942 and 1943.

== See also ==
- List of Antarctic and subantarctic islands
