= Beta Island =

Island in Palmer Archipelago, Antarctica

Location of Beta Island in the Melchior Islands

Beta Island (64°19′S 63°0′W) is a small island which lies immediately north of Kappa Island and close southwest of Alpha Island in the Melchior Islands, Palmer Archipelago. The name, derived from the second letter of the Greek alphabet, was probably given by Discovery Investigations personnel who roughly surveyed the island in 1927. The island was also surveyed by Argentine expeditions in 1942, 1943 and 1948. The Island has no human population, and Averages a very cold temperature of -15°.

== See also ==
- List of Antarctic and sub-Antarctic islands
