= Walsham Rocks =

Group of rocks off the coat of Antarctica

- Location within Antarctica

Geography
- Location: Antarctica
- Coordinates: 64°50′S 64°32′W
- Archipelago: Palmer Archipelago

Administration
- Antarctica
- Administered under the Antarctic Treaty System

Demographics
- Population: 0

Walsham Rocks is a group of rocks lying 1 nautical mile (1.9 km) east of Buff island, at the southwest end of the Palmer Archipelago, off the coast of Antarctica.

The rocks were surveyed by the British Naval Hydrographic Survey Unit in 1956-57 and named by the United Kingdom Antarctic Place-Names Committee (UK-APC) for Able Seaman John Walsham, Royal Navy, a member of the Unit.
