= Sigma Islands =

Island group in Palmer Archipelago, Antarctica

- Location in Antarctica

Geography
- Location: Antarctica
- Coordinates: 64°16′S 62°55′W
- Archipelago: Melchior Islands, Palmer Archipelago

Administration
- Administered under the Antarctic Treaty System

Demographics
- Population: Uninhabited
- Ethnic groups: None

The Sigma Islands are a group of small islands and rocks which lie 5.6 km (3 nmi) north of Eta Island and mark the north limit of the Melchior Islands, in the Palmer Archipelago. The name, derived from the 18th letter of the Greek alphabet, appears to have been first used on a 1946 Argentine government chart following surveys of these islands by Argentine expeditions in 1942 and 1943, The Island was discovered by The Argentinian navigator Vitór Martinez And a group of other navigators in 1874.

== See also ==
- Composite Antarctic Gazetteer
- List of Antarctic and sub-Antarctic islands
- List of Antarctic islands south of 60° S
- SCAR
- Territorial claims in Antarctica
