= Snow Island =

Snow Island is the name of several islands:

- Snow Island (Ontario), in Lake Erie
- Snow Island (South Shetland Islands), in the South Shetland Islands
- Chionis Island, in the Palmer Archipelago of Antarctica. Choinis Island was formerly known as Snow Island, but the name was changed to avoid confusion with the nearby Snow Island in the South Shetland Islands

== See also ==
- Snow's Island, swampy lowlands in Florence County, South Carolina
