= Pi Islands =

Islands in Palmer Archipelago, Antarctica

- Location in Antarctica

Geography
- Location: Antarctica
- Coordinates: 64°20′S 62°53′W
- Archipelago: Melchior Islands, Palmer Archipelago

Administration
- Administered under the Antarctic Treaty System

Demographics
- Population: Uninhabited

Pi Islands are two islands and several rocks which lie 2 kilometres (1 nmi) east of the northeast end of Omega Island among the Melchior Islands, Palmer Archipelago. The name, derived from the 16th letter of the Greek alphabet, appears to have been first used on a 1946 Argentine government chart following surveys of these islands by Argentine expeditions in 1942 and 1943.

== See also ==
- List of Antarctic and sub-Antarctic islands
