= Tau Islands =

Location of Tau Islands in the Melchior Islands

Tau Islands (64°18′S 62°55′W) is a small group of islands and rocks which lie immediately off the northeast extremity of Eta Island in the Melchior Islands, Palmer Archipelago. The name, derived from the 19th letter of the Greek alphabet, appears to have been first used on a 1946 Argentine government chart following surveys of the islands by Argentine expeditions in 1942 and 1943.

== See also ==
- List of Antarctic and sub-Antarctic islands
