= Schist Point =

Schist Point (60°43′S 45°14′W) is a conspicuous point at the west side of Divide Peaks on the south coast of Coronation Island, in the South Orkney Islands. First surveyed by DI personnel in 1933. The name, applied by the Falkland Islands Dependencies Survey (FIDS) following their survey of 1948–49, marks the eastern limit at sea level of the metamorphic rocks in this part of Coronation Island.
