= Epsilon Island =

Epsilon Island may refer to:

- Epsilon Island (Antarctica) 64°19′S 63°0′W
- Epsilon Island (Bermuda) 32°17′N 64°49′W
- Epsilon Island (Western Australia) 20°26′45″S 115°34′44″E
