= Loudwater Cove =

Cove in Antarctica

Loudwater Cove (64°46′S 64°5′W) is a small west-facing cove, 0.5 nautical miles (1 km) long, lying immediately north of Norsel Point along the southwest coast of Anvers Island, in the Palmer Archipelago, Antarctica. It was surveyed in 1955 by the Falkland Islands Dependencies Survey and so named because of the thundering noise with which the sea beats into this cove.
