= Psi Islands =

Group of Islands in Antarctica

- Location in Antarctica

Geography
- Location: Antarctica
- Coordinates: 64°18′S 63°1′W
- Archipelago: Melchior Islands, Palmer Archipelago

Administration
- Administered under the Antarctic Treaty System

Demographics
- Population: Uninhabited

Psi Islands is a group of small islands which lie close to the west side of Lambda Island in the Melchior Islands, Palmer Archipelago. The name, derived from the 23rd letter of the Greek alphabet, appears to have been first used on a 1946 Argentine government chart following surveys of these islands by Argentine expeditions in 1942 and 1943.

== See also ==
- Composite Antarctic Gazetteer
- List of Antarctic and sub-Antarctic islands
- List of Antarctic islands south of 60° S
- SCAR
- Territorial claims in Antarctica
