= Andersen Harbor =

Bay in Antarctica

Location of Andersen Harbor
Antarctica

Andersen Harbor (64°19′S 62°56′W) is a small bay in the Melchior Islands, Palmer Archipelago, Antarctica, formed by the concave west side of Eta Island and the north end of Omega Island. It was charted by Discovery Investigations in 1927 and probably named after Kapt. Ola Andersen of the factory ship Svend Foyn, following the usage of Norwegian whalers that had operated in the area. The harbor was surveyed by Argentine expeditions in 1942, 1943 and 1948.
