= Jacobs Island =

Island in Palmer Archipelago, Antarctica

- Location within Antarctica

Geography
- Location: Antarctica
- Coordinates: 64°48′S 64°1′W

Administration
- Administered under the Antarctic Treaty System

Demographics
- Population: Uninhabited

Jacobs Island is a narrow island 560 m (0.3 nmi) long between the Hellerman Rocks and Laggard Island, off the southwest coast of Anvers Island, Antarctica. It was named by the Advisory Committee on Antarctic Names for U.S. Navy Lieutenant Commander Paul F. Jacobs, Officer-in-Charge of Palmer Station in 1972.

== See also ==
- List of Antarctic and subantarctic islands
