= Humble Island =

- Location within Antarctica

Geography
- Location: Antarctica
- Coordinates: 64°46′S 64°06′W
- Archipelago: Palmer Archipelago

Administration
- Administered under the Antarctic Treaty System

Demographics
- Population: Uninhabited

Humble Island is a small rocky island lying 0.74 km (0.4 nmi) south-east of Norsel Point on Amsler Island, off the south-west coast of Anvers Island in the Palmer Archipelago of Antarctica. Humble Island was surveyed by the Falkland Islands Dependencies Survey (FIDS) in 1955. Humble Island was named by the United Kingdom Antarctic Place-names Committee (UK-APC) in 1956 because the island seems to be squeezed insignificantly between Litchfield Island and what was then considered the coast of Anvers Island (now known to be separate Amsler Island).

== Birds ==
The island formed part of the Northern Arthur Harbour Important Bird Area (IBA) number 013, identified as such by BirdLife International because it supports significant seabird breeding colonies. The Arthur Harbour IBA was delisted in 2015.

== See also ==
- List of Antarctic and subantarctic islands
