= Theta Islands =

Islands off Kappa Island in the Palmer Archipelago, Antarctica

- Location of Theta Islands within the Melchior Islands

- Location within Antarctic Peninsula Location within Antarctica
- Etymology: Theta, Greek letter

Geography
- Location: Melchior Islands, Dallmann Bay
- Coordinates: 64°19′S 63°1′W
- Archipelago: Palmer Archipelago

Theta Islands (64°19′S 63°1′W) are several small islands and rocks which lie close west of Kappa Island at the west extremity of the Melchior Islands, Palmer Archipelago. The islands were roughly charted by Discovery Investigations personnel in 1927. The name, derived from the eighth letter of the Greek alphabet, appears to have been first used on a 1946 Argentine government chart following surveys of the Melchior Islands by Argentine expeditions in 1942 and 1943.

== See also ==
- List of Antarctic and sub-Antarctic islands
