= Bremen Island =

Island in Palmer Archipelago, Antarctica

- Location in Antarctica

Geography
- Location: Antarctica
- Coordinates: 64.322°S 62.935°W
- Archipelago: Melchior Islands, Palmer Archipelago
- Area: 1 km^{2} (0.39 sq mi)

Administration
- Administered under the Antarctic Treaty System

Demographics
- Population: Uninhabited

Bremen Island (German: Bremeninsel), also known as Zeta Island, is a 1 km^{2} (0.39 sq mi) or 100 ha (247 acres) uninhabited island, part of the Melchior Islands in the Southern Ocean along the west coast of the Antarctic Peninsula.

A 1 km (0.62 mi) long channel (Bremenkanal) separates Omega Island and Bremen Island. The existence of the channel was discovered during a zodiac excursion on 2 February 2003 by the German cruise ship MS Bremen, named after the German city of Bremen. The name "Bremen Island" was proposed by Bärbel Krämer of Hapag-Lloyd.

== See also ==
- Composite Antarctic Gazetteer
- List of Antarctic islands south of 60° S
- SCAR
- Territorial claims in Antarctica
