= Normanna Reef =

Normanna Reef (64°21′S 62°59′W) is a reef lying near the center of the south entrance to the sound in the Melchior Islands, Palmer Archipelago. The name appears on a chart based upon a 1927 survey by DI personnel.
