= Epsilon Island (Antarctica) =

Island in Palmer Archipelago, Antarctica

- Location in Antarctica

Geography
- Location: Antarctica
- Coordinates: 64°19′S 63°0′W
- Archipelago: Palmer Archipelago

Administration
- Administered under the Antarctic Treaty System

Demographics
- Population: Uninhabited

Epsilon Island in the Antarctic is a small island lying between Alpha Island and the southern extremity of Lambda Island in the Melchior Islands, Palmer Archipelago. The island was roughly surveyed by Discovery Investigations personnel in 1927. The name, derived from epsilon, the fifth letter of the Greek alphabet, appears to have been first used on a 1946 Argentine government chart following surveys of the Melchior Islands by Argentine expeditions in 1942 and 1943.

== See also ==
- List of Antarctic and sub-Antarctic islands
