= Gamma Island =

Island in Palmer Archipelago, Antarctica

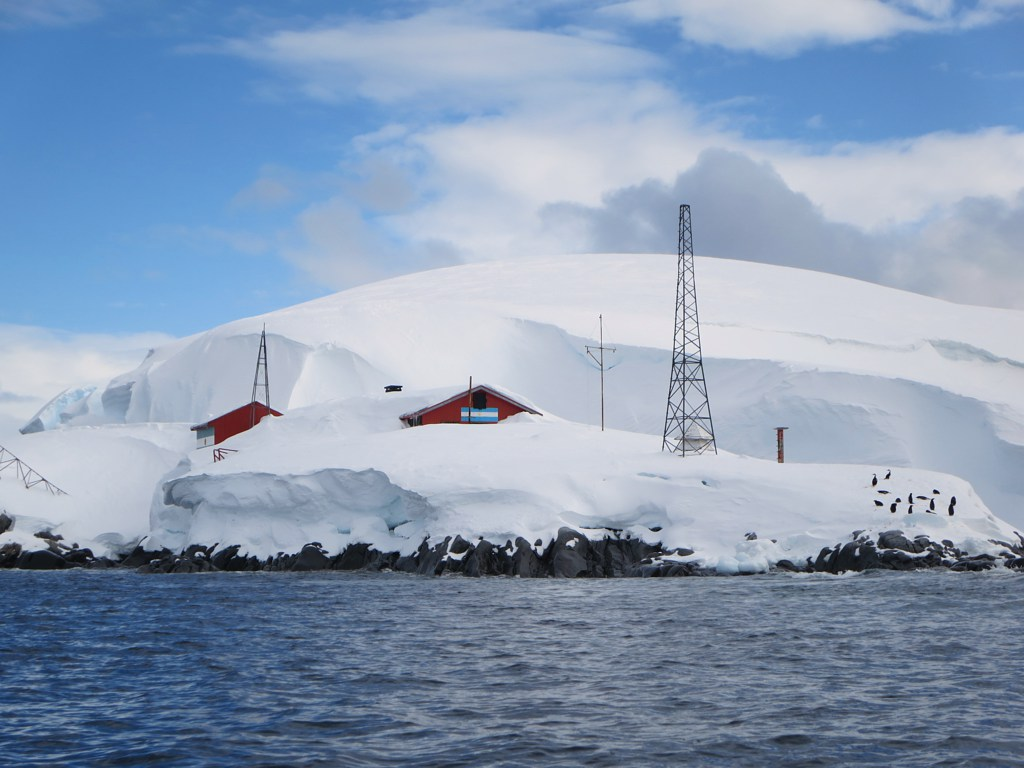

- Location in Antarctica

Geography
- Location: Antarctica
- Coordinates: 64°20′S 63°0′W
- Archipelago: Palmer Archipelago
- Highest elevation: 140 m (460 ft)

Administration
- Administered under the Antarctic Treaty System

Demographics
- Population: Uninhabited

Gamma Island is an island, 1.6 kilometres (1 mi) long, which marks the southwestern extremity of the Melchior Islands in the Palmer Archipelago. This island was first roughly charted and named "Ile Gouts" by the French Antarctic Expedition, 1903–05, under Jean-Baptiste Charcot, but that name has not survived in usage. The current name, derived from gamma, the third letter of the Greek alphabet, was probably given by Discovery Investigations personnel who roughly surveyed the island in 1927. The island was also surveyed by Argentine expeditions in 1942, 1943 and 1948. The Argentines call it Isla Observatorio and erected the Melchior Base there in 1947.

== See also ==
- Gallows Point
- List of Antarctic and sub-Antarctic islands
