= MS Bremen =

Cruise ship

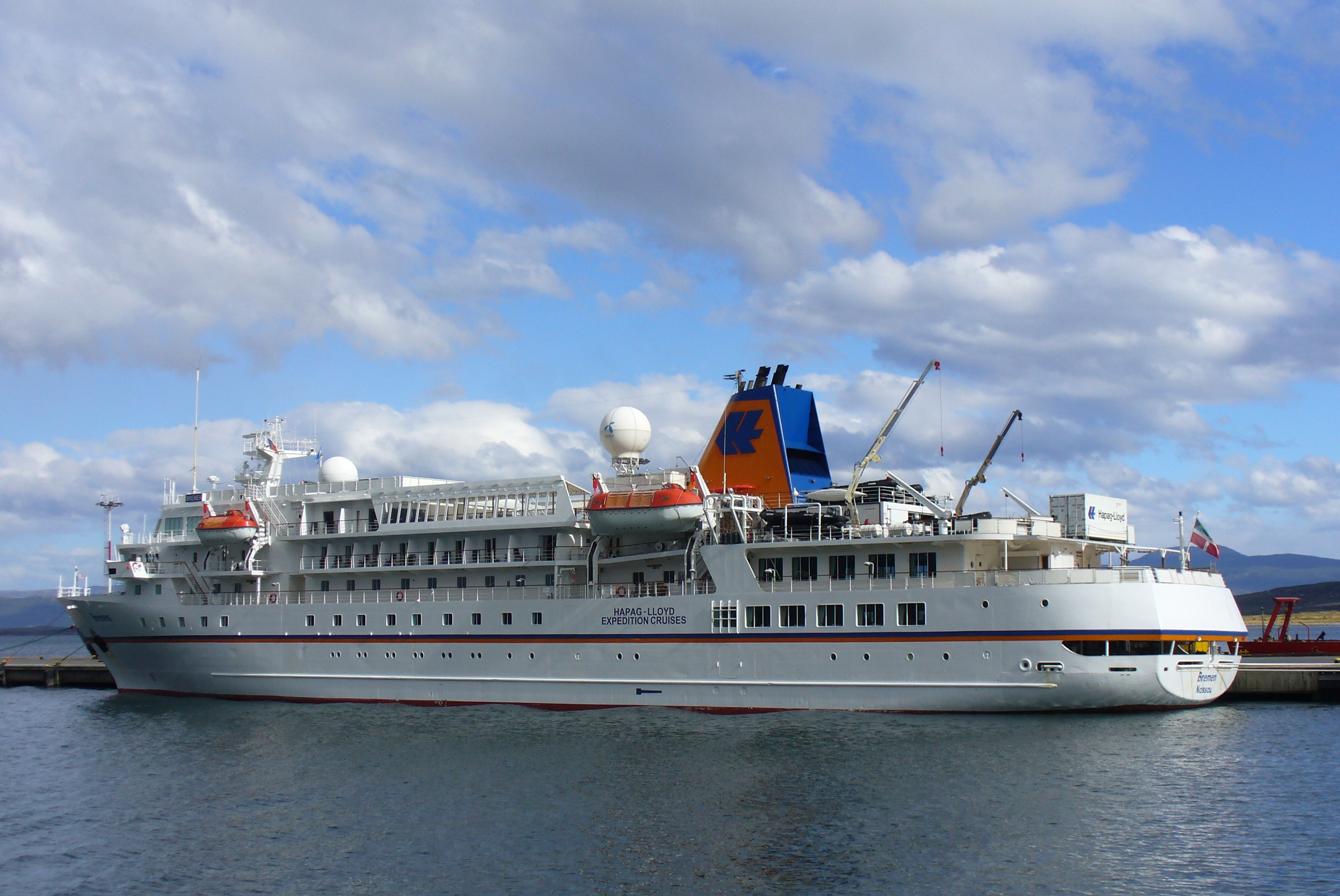
- MS Seaventure (then Bremen) in Ushuaia, Argentina

History

Bahamas
- Name: Frontier Spirit (1990–1993); Bremen (1993–2020); Seaventure (2020–present)
- Owner: Frontier Cruises (1990–1993); Hapag-Lloyd / Hapag-Lloyd Cruises (1990–present)
- Port of registry: Nassau, Bahamas
- Builder: Mitsubishi Heavy Industries, Kobe, Japan
- Yard number: 1182
- Laid down: 26 January 1990
- Launched: 20 June 1990
- Completed: July 1990
- Identification: IMO number: 8907424; Call sign: C6JC3; MMSI number: 308429000
- Status: In service

General characteristics
- Type: Cruise ship
- Tonnage: 6,752 GT; 2,073 NT; 1,226 DWT
- Length: 111.51 m (365 ft 10 in) o/a; 98 m (321 ft 6 in) p/p
- Beam: 17 m (55 ft 9 in)
- Draught: 4.8 m (15 ft 9 in)
- Depth: 6.61 m (21 ft 8 in)
- Decks: 7
- Installed power: 2 × Daihatsu 8 km-32 (2 × 2,427 kW)
- Propulsion: Two shafts, controllable pitch propellers; Bow thruster (382 kW)
- Speed: 16 knots (30 km/h; 18 mph)
- Capacity: 155 passengers

MS Seaventure is a cruise ship with a capacity of 155 passengers designed for the polar expedition market. She was built as Frontier Spirit at the Mitsubishi Shipyard, Kobe, Japan, in 1990 and operated by Hapag-Lloyd Cruises GmbH as MS Bremen beginning in 1993.

In January 2019 the ship was sold to Scylla AG with a planned handover date of May 2021. She was renamed Seaventure in 2020 and was chartered by expedition cruise company Polar Latitudes in the austral summer and by Iceland ProCruises in the boreal summer. In 2024, the ship was sold to Chinese company 66expeditions, and in May 2025 the new owner took over.

During a storm in the Southern Atlantic in March 2001, a rogue wave caused heavy damage, breaking a window on the bridge. It left the ship adrift for two hours without propulsion. Bremen was featured in the TV show Killer Waves.

Bremen discovered a previously uncharted island in the Antarctic in 2003, and it was named Bremen Island in 2004.

In 2006 she successfully ran the Northwest Passage, helped by satellite images telling where sea ice was.

In July 2018, a crew member shot and killed a polar bear in the Svalbard archipelago. The company said that the incident could not have been avoided and was an act of self-defense. Another crew member, who was leading passengers on a shore excursion, was injured by the bear and was evacuated by helicopter.
