= Divide Peaks =

Mountain in South Orkney Islands

The Divide Peaks (60°43′S 45°12′W) are a series of ice-topped peaks, the highest at 640 metres (2,100 ft), rising from the southeast end of Coronation Island and extending for 2 nautical miles (4 km) in a northwesterly direction, in the South Orkney Islands. They were surveyed in 1948–49 by the Falkland Islands Dependencies Survey, 1956–58, and named in association with The Divide.

== See also ==
- Schist Point
