= Kappa Island =

Location of Kappa Island in the Melchior Islands

Kappa Island (64°19′S 63°0′W) is an island, nearly 0.5 nautical miles (0.9 km) long, lying immediately south of Beta Island and close east of the Theta Islands in the Melchior Islands of the Palmer Archipelago, Antarctica. The name, derived from kappa, the tenth letter of the Greek alphabet, probably was given by Discovery Investigations personnel who roughly surveyed the island in 1927. The island was resurveyed by Argentine expeditions in 1942, 1943 and 1948. The island's name in Spanish is Isla Primer Teniente López.

== See also ==
- List of Antarctic and sub-Antarctic islands
