= Torgersen Island =

Island in the Palmer Archipelago, Antarctica

Torgersen
- Location within Antarctica

Geography
- Location: Antarctica
- Coordinates: 64°46′S 64°5′W
- Archipelago: Palmer Archipelago

Administration
- Administered under the Antarctic Treaty System

Demographics
- Population: 0

Torgersen Island is a small rocky island lying just east of Litchfield Island in the entrance to Arthur Harbour, off the south-west coast of Anvers Island in the Palmer Archipelago of Antarctica. It was surveyed by the Falkland Islands Dependencies Survey in 1955 and named by the UK-APC for Torstein Torgersen, first mate of the Harbor in late February 1955, preceding the vessel Norsel in one of the ship's boats and making soundings.

== Birds ==
The island formed part of the Northern Arthur Harbour Important Bird Area (IBA) number 013, identified as such by BirdLife International because it supports significant seabird breeding colonies. The Arthur Harbour IBA was delisted in 2015.

== See also ==
- List of Antarctic and subantarctic islands
