= Hermit Island (Antarctic) =

Antarctic island

- Location within Antarctica

Geography
- Location: Antarctica
- Coordinates: 64°48′S 64°02′W
- Archipelago: Palmer Archipelago

Administration
- Administered under the Antarctic Treaty System

Demographics
- Population: Uninhabited

Hermit Island is an island nearly 2 kilometres (1 nmi) long, lying 3 kilometres (1.5 nmi) southeast of Bonaparte Point, off the southwest coast of Anvers Island in the Palmer Archipelago. So named by the United Kingdom Antarctic Place-names Committee (UK-APC) in 1958 because a member of the Falkland Islands Dependencies Survey (FIDS) at the Arthur Harbor station spent some time on this island alone in January 1957, making survey observations.

== See also ==
- Composite Antarctic Gazetteer
- List of Antarctic and sub-Antarctic islands
- List of Antarctic islands south of 60° S
- SCAR
- Territorial claims in Antarctica
