= Tetrad Islands =

Archipelago in Antarctica

- Location within Antarctica

Geography
- Location: Antarctica
- Coordinates: 63°55′S 60°44′W
- Archipelago: Palmer Archipelago

Administration
- Administered under the Antarctic Treaty System

Demographics
- Population: Uninhabited

Tetrad Islands is a group of small islands lying southeast of Borge Point at Mikkelsen Harbor on Trinity Island in the Palmer Archipelago, Antarctica. They were shown on a 1952 Argentine government chart. The name given by the United Kingdom Antarctic Place-Names Committee (UK-APC) in 1960 is descriptive; there are four islands in the group.

== See also ==
- List of Antarctic and sub-Antarctic islands
