= Abbott Island =

Island off the coast of Antarctica

- Location within Antarctica Location within Antarctic Peninsula

Geography
- Location: Antarctica
- Coordinates: 64°6′S 62°8′W
- Archipelago: Palmer Archipelago

Administration
- None

Demographics
- Population: Uninhabited

Additional information
- Administered under the Antarctic Treaty System

Abbott Island is an island lying 2 kilometres (1 nmi) west of Davis Island in the south part of Bouquet Bay, off the northeast side of Brabant Island in the Palmer Archipelago. Roughly charted by the French Antarctic Expedition under Jean-Baptiste Charcot, 1903–05. Photographed by Hunting Aerosurveys Ltd in 1956–57, and mapped from these photos in 1959. Named by the United Kingdom Antarctic Place-Names Committee (UK-APC) after Maude Abbott, a Canadian authority on congenital heart disease.

== See also ==
- Composite Antarctic Gazetteer
- List of Antarctic and sub-Antarctic islands
- Scientific Committee on Antarctic Research
- Territorial claims in Antarctica
