= Hellerman Rocks =

Group of seven small islets and rocks off the coast of Anvers Island, Antarctica

The Hellerman Rocks (64°48′S 64°1′W) are a group of seven small islets and rocks connected by a shoal, located 0.4 nautical miles (0.7 km) east of Hermit Island, off the southwest coast of Anvers Island, Antarctica. It was named by the Advisory Committee on Antarctic Names for Lieutenant Lance W. Hellerman of the U.S. Navy Reserve, Officer-in-Charge of Palmer Station in 1969.
