= Yokes =

Yokes may refer to:

== People with the surname ==
- William J. Yokes (1918–1942), United States Navy sailor for whom a U.S. Navy high-speed transport was named

== Ships ==
- USS Yokes (DE-668), a United States Navy destroyer escort converted during construction into the high-speed transport USS Yokes (APD-69)
- USS Yokes (APD-69), a United States Navy high-speed transport in commission from 1944 to 1946

== See also ==
- Yoke
- Yoke's Fresh Market, a chain of grocery stores in the United States
