= Delta Island =

Islands in Antarctica

- Location in Antarctica

Geography
- Location: Antarctica
- Coordinates: 64°19′S 62°59′W
- Archipelago: Melchior Islands, Palmer Archipelago
- Length: 0.8 km (0.5 mi)

Administration
- Administered under the Antarctic Treaty System

Demographics
- Population: Uninhabited

Delta Island is an island 1 kilometre (0.5 nmi) long, lying close southeast of Lambda Island and east of Alpha Island in the Melchior Islands, Palmer Archipelago. The name, derived from the fourth letter of the Greek alphabet, was probably given by Discovery Investigations personnel who roughly surveyed the island in 1927. The island was surveyed by Argentine expeditions in 1942, 1943 and 1948.

== See also ==
- Bills Point
- Composite Antarctic Gazetteer
- Harpun Rocks
- List of Antarctic islands south of 60° S
- Scientific Committee on Antarctic Research
- Territorial claims in Antarctica
