= Yoke Island =

Island in the Palmer Archipelago, Antarctica

- Location within Antarctica

Geography
- Location: Antarctica
- Coordinates: 63°58′S 61°56′W
- Archipelago: Palmer Archipelago

Administration
- Administered under the Antarctic Treaty System

Demographics
- Population: Uninhabited

Yoke Island, known also as Islotes Los Provincianos is an island lying west of the north end of Liège Island in the Palmer Archipelago. Charted by the French Antarctic Expedition under Charcot, 1903–05. The name given by the United Kingdom Antarctic Place-Names Committee (UK-APC) in 1960 is descriptive of the shape of the island in both plan and elevation.

== See also ==
- Composite Antarctic Gazetteer
- List of Antarctic and sub-Antarctic islands
- List of Antarctic islands south of 60° S
- SCAR
- Territorial claims in Antarctica
