= Gallows Bay =

Gallows Bay may refer to:

- Gallows Bay, Christiansted, United States Virgin Islands
- Gallows Bay, Oranjestad, Netherlands Antilles
