= Arthur Harbour =

Location of Arthur Harbour
Antarctica

Arthur Harbour (64°46′S 64°04′W) is a small harbour entered between Bonaparte Point and Amsler Island on the south-west coast of Anvers Island in the Palmer Archipelago of Antarctica.

== History ==
Arthur Harbour was roughly charted by the French Antarctic Expedition (1903–1905) under Jean-Baptiste Charcot. It was surveyed in more detail in 1955 by the Falkland Islands Dependencies Survey (FIDS), who established a station near the head of the harbour. It was named by the United Kingdom Antarctic Place-names Committee (UK-APC) in 1956 after Oswald Raynor Arthur, then Governor of the Falkland Islands.

=== Station N ===
Station N
- Antarctic research station
- Interactive map of Station N
- Coordinates: 64°45′36″S 64°04′48″W
- Established: 28 February 1955
- Destroyed: 28 December 1971

Government
  - Type: Administration
  - Body: BAS, United Kingdom
- Active times: All year-round

Arthur Harbour was the location of the British research Station N, which was active from 28 February 1955 to 10 January 1958. The Station was loaned to the United States government on 2 July 1963. In January 1965, it was converted into a biological laboratory for use by American personnel from nearby Palmer Station. Station N was destroyed by fire on 28 December 1971, while under renovation by the British Antarctic Survey. The debris was removed in 1991, and only concrete foundations now remain.

== Geography ==
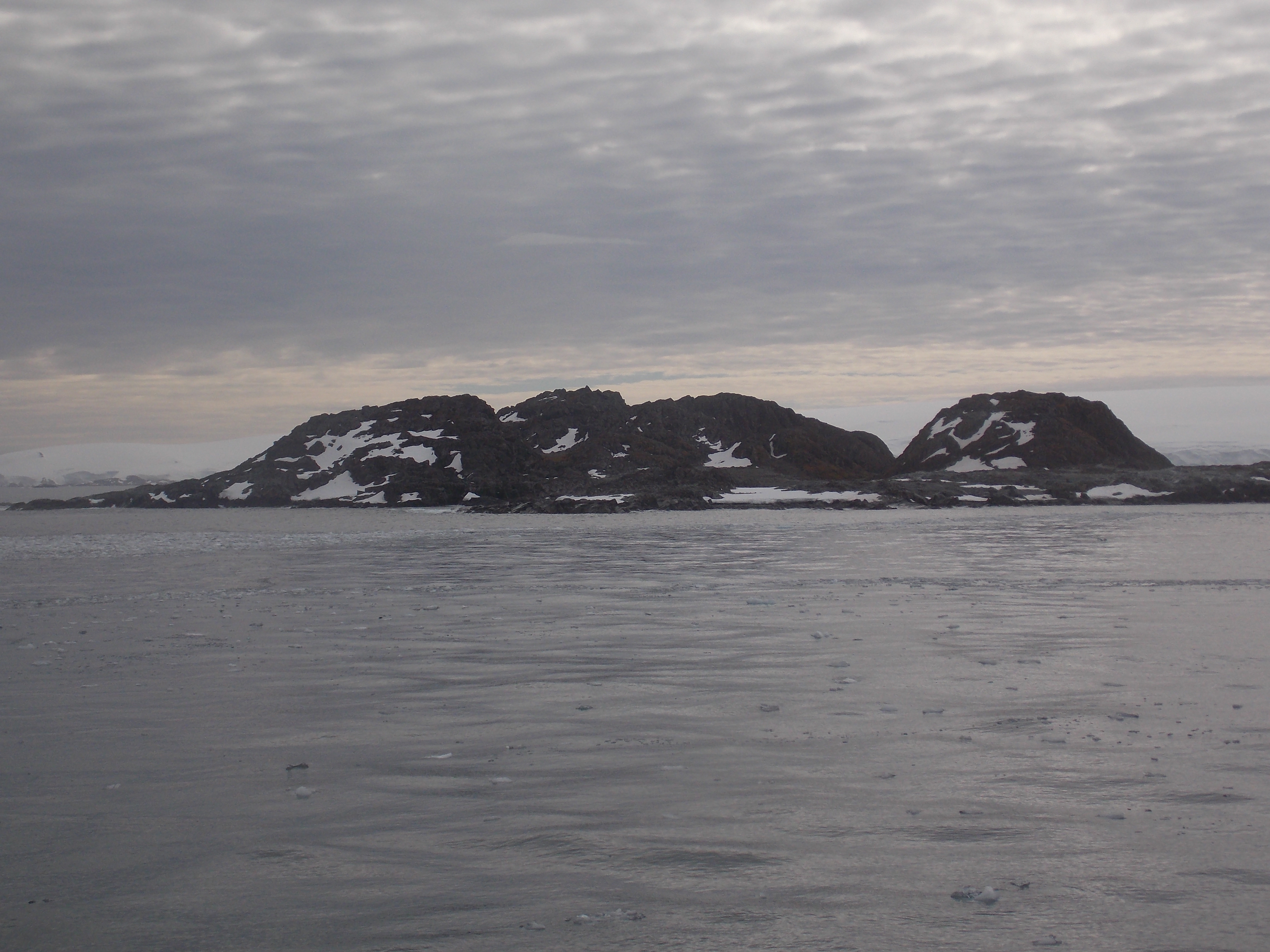
Litchfield Island, off the coast of Arthur Harbour

A number of features in and around Arthur Harbour were named and charted by various Antarctic surveys and expedition groups.

Prior to 2005, Norsel Point was considered the northern headland of Arthur Harbour, but is now considered a part of Amsler Island, just off the coast. Bonaparte Point, named by Charcot for Roland-Napoléon Bonaparte, marks the southern edge of Arthur Harbour. In addition to Amsler Island, Humble Island, Litchfield Island, Torgersen Island, and Dietrich Island are all off the coast of Arthur Harbour.

=== Important Bird Area ===
Some 214 ha of land and sea in northern Arthur Harbour, about 1–2 km north-west of Palmer Station, was listed as Important Bird Area (IBA) number 013 by BirdLife International until being delisted in 2015. The site comprised Norsel Point, Humble Island, Breaker Island, Elephant Rocks and Torgersen Island, along with the intervening marine zone. Some of the islands have been designated Restricted Zones within ASMA 7: Southwest Anvers Island and Palmer Basin. The site was an IBA because it supports colonies of breeding seabirds, including Adélie penguins (11,500 pairs), macaroni penguins, southern giant petrels and imperial shags. Litchfield Island remains listed as IBA number 014.

== See also ==
- List of Antarctic research stations
- List of Antarctic field camps
- ARA Bahía Paraíso (ship sunk in 1989)
