= Chionis Island =

Island in the Palmer Archipelago

- Location within Antarctica

Geography
- Location: Antarctica
- Coordinates: 63°52′S 60°38′W
- Archipelago: Palmer Archipelago

Administration
- Administered under the Antarctic Treaty System

Demographics
- Population: Uninhabited

Chionis Island is an island lying south of Awl Point, Trinity Island, in the Palmer Archipelago. The name Snow Island was used for this feature by whalers in the area in the 1920s, but has not been used on any published map. Since Snow Island in the South Shetland Islands lies just across Bransfield Strait, a new name has been substituted for this feature. Chionis Island was so named by the UK Antarctic Place-Names Committee in 1960 after the sheathbill (Chionis albus), a common bird in this region.

The Minerva Rocks are a small group of rocks lying off Chionis Island. They were so named by whalers because the Minerva, one of the whale catchers of the British factory ship Pythia, went aground on these rocks in March 1922. The catcher was abandoned and, because of the heavy swell, became a total wreck.

== See also ==
- List of Antarctic and sub-Antarctic islands
