= Buff Island =

Island in Palmer Archipelago, Antarctica

- Location within Antarctica

Geography
- Location: Antarctica
- Coordinates: 64°51′S 64°35′W
- Archipelago: Palmer Archipelago

Administration
- Administered under the Antarctic Treaty System

Demographics
- Population: Uninhabited

Buff Island is an Antarctic island which lies 3 nautical miles (6 km) southwest of the Joubin Islands and 10.5 nautical miles (19 km) southwest of Cape Monaco, Anvers Island, at the southwest end of the Palmer Archipelago. The island appears to be first shown and named on a 1936 chart by the British Graham Land Expedition under John Rymill.

== See also ==
- List of Antarctic and sub-Antarctic islands
