= Alpha Island =

Island in the Melchior Islands, Antarctica

Isla Huidobro

- Location in Antarctica

Geography
- Location: Antarctica
- Coordinates: 64°19′S 63°0′W
- Archipelago: Melchior Islands, Palmer Archipelago

Administration
- Administered under the Antarctic Treaty System

Demographics
- Population: Uninhabited

Alpha Island, also known as Isla Huidobro, is a small island lying between Epsilon Island and Delta Island in the Melchior Islands, Palmer Archipelago. Charted by Discovery Investigations in 1927 and named after the first letter of the Greek alphabet, in association with the names of other islands in this group. The island was surveyed by Argentine expeditions in 1942, 1943 and 1948.

== See also ==
- Composite Antarctic Gazetteer
- List of Antarctic islands south of 60° S
- Scientific Committee on Antarctic Research
- Territorial claims in Antarctica
