= USS Yokes =

Transport ship in United States Navy

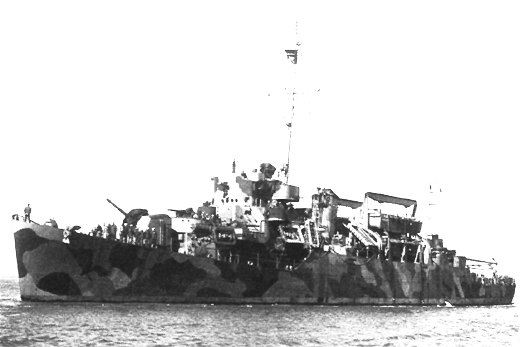
- USS Yokes

History

United States
- Name: USS Yokes
- Namesake: Seaman Second Class William J. Yokes (1918–1942), U.S. Navy sailor killed in action during World War II
- Builder: Consolidated Steel Corporation, Orange, Texas
- Laid down: 22 August 1943
- Launched: 27 November 1943
- Sponsored by: Mrs. Charlotte Yokes
- Commissioned: 18 December 1944
- Decommissioned: 19 August 1946
- Reclassified: From destroyer escort (DE-668) to high-speed transport (APD-69) 27 June 1944
- Stricken: 1 April 1964
- Honors and awards: One battle star for World War II service
- Fate: Sold for scrapping 1965
- Notes: Laid down as Buckley-class destroyer escort USS Yokes (DE-668)

General characteristics
- Class & type: Charles Lawrence-class high-speed transport
- Displacement: 1,400 long tons (1,422 t)
- Length: 306 ft (93 m) overall
- Beam: 36 ft 10 in (11.23 m)
- Draft: 13 ft 6 in (4.11 m) maximum
- Installed power: 12,000 shaft horsepower (16 megawatts)
- Propulsion: Two boilers; two GE steam turbines (turbo-electric transmission)
- Speed: 24 knots (44 km/h; 28 mph)
- Range: 6,000 nautical miles (11,000 km) at 12 knots (22 km/h; 14 mph)
- Troops: 162
- Complement: 186
- Armament: 1 × 5 in (130 mm) gun; 6 × 40 mm guns; 6 × 20 mm guns; 2 × depth charge tracks

USS Yokes (APD-69), ex-DE-668, was a United States Navy high-speed transport in commission from 1944 to 1946.

The ship's namesake, William John Yokes, was killed by a German U-boat aboard the merchant ship SS Steel Navigator in October 1942.

== Construction and commissioning ==
Yokes was laid down as the Buckley-class destroyer escort USS Yokes (DE-668) on 22 August 1943 at Orange, Texas, by the Consolidated Steel Corporation and launched as such on 27 November 1943, sponsored by Mrs. Charlotte Yokes, widow of the ship's namesake, Seaman Second Class William J. Yokes. Yokes was reclassified as a Charles Lawrence-class high-speed transport and redesignated APD-69 on 27 June 1944. After conversion to her new role, she was commissioned on 18 December 1944.

== Service history ==
=== World War II ===
After shakedown off Bermuda and post-shakedown repairs at the Norfolk Navy Yard at Portsmouth, Virginia, Yokes steamed to the United States West Coast via the Panama Canal, and arrived at San Diego, California, on 14 March 1945. After further training, Yokes departed San Diego on 19 March 1945, bound for the Hawaiian Islands. She made port at Pearl Harbor, Territory of Hawaii, on 26 March 1945 and trained at Maui with underwater demolition teams for one week before she departed for World War II service in the Western Pacific.

Arriving at Okinawa on 1 May 1945, Yokes operated in that vicinity through June, serving in the Okinawa campaign as an antisubmarine screening vessel, a rescue ship, and as an escort ship. On 10 May 1945, her gunners claimed a Japanese Mitsubishi A6M "Zeke" (or "Zero") fighter shot down.

Yokes moved to the Mariana Islands in July 1945, escorting Landing Ship Tank Flotilla 36 from Okinawa to Saipan between 4 and 10 July 1945 and then briefly anchoring at Apra Harbor, Guam, before heading for Pearl Harbor, where the ship took on board the 14 officers and 79 enlisted men of Underwater Demolition Team 28 on 25 July 1945. She then steamed on to the U.S. West Coast, reaching Oceanside, California on 2 August 1945. Transferring Underwater Demolition Team 28 to tank landing craft USS LCT-395 upon her arrival at Oceanside, Yokes departed Oceanside for San Diego that same day.

Shifting to the Western Pipe and Steel Company shipyard at San Pedro, California, on 5 August 1945, Yokes underwent 15 days of repairs there, during which World War II came to end with the surrender of Japan on 15 August 1945.

=== Postwar ===
Upon completion of her repairs, Yokes conducted a brief stint of training off the coast of Southern California. She then departed San Diego on 5 September 1945 to return to the Far East, touching at Manila Bay, Subic Bay, Tacloban, and Samar in the Philippine Islands, Buckner Bay on Okinawa, Guam, Manus Island, and Shanghai, China, on transport operations into the winter of 1945–1946.

Departing Manila Bay on 23 January 1946, Yokes steamed via Pearl Harbor to San Diego, which she reached on 15 February 1946. She remained there undergoing repairs through the summer of 1946.

== Decommissioning and disposal ==
Decommissioned at San Diego on 19 August 1946, Yokes was berthed there in the San Diego Group of the Pacific Reserve Fleet. After nearly 18 years of inactivity in reserve, she was stricken from the Navy List on 1 April 1964 and in 1965 was sold to the National Metal and Steel Corporation of Terminal Island, California, for scrapping.

== Honors and awards ==
Yokes received one battle star for her World War II service in the Okinawa campaign.
