= Lambda Island =

Island in Palmer Archipelago, Antarctica

- Location in Antarctica Lambda Island (Antarctic Peninsula)

Geography
- Location: Antarctica
- Coordinates: 64°18′S 62°59′W
- Archipelago: Melchior Islands, Palmer Archipelago
- Length: 2.2 km (1.37 mi)
- Width: 1 km (0.6 mi)

Administration
- Administered under the Antarctic Treaty System

Demographics
- Population: Uninhabited

Lambda Island is an island lying immediately north-west of Delta Island in the Melchior Islands, of the Palmer Archipelago in Antarctica. The island, the largest in the north-western part of the island group, was first roughly charted and named "Île Sourrieu" by the French Antarctic Expedition, 1903–05 under Jean-Baptiste Charcot, but that name has not survived in usage. The current name, derived from lambda, the 11th letter of the Greek alphabet, was given by Discovery Investigations personnel who roughly charted the island in 1927. The island was surveyed by Argentine expeditions in 1942, 1943 and 1948.

== Historic site ==
A lighthouse named ‘Primero de Mayo’ was erected on the island by Argentina in 1942. It was the first Argentine lighthouse in the Antarctic and has been designated a Historic Site or Monument (HSM 29), following a proposal by Argentina to the Antarctic Treaty Consultative Meeting.

== See also ==
- List of Antarctic and subantarctic islands
