= Amsler Island =

Island in Palmer Archipelago, Antarctica

- Location within Antarctica

Geography
- Location: Antarctica
- Coordinates: 64°45′48″S 64°05′12″W
- Archipelago: Palmer Archipelago
- Length: 2.1 km (1.3 mi)
- Width: 1 km (0.6 mi)

Administration
- Administered under the Antarctic Treaty System

Demographics
- Population: Uninhabited

Amsler Island is a small island off the south coast of Anvers Island in the Palmer Archipelago of Antarctica. It sits between Loudwater Cove and Arthur Harbour.

The island is a roughly triangular rocky plot of granite land approximately 2.1 km (1.3 mi) long and 1 km (0.6 mi) wide at its widest point. Narrow Norsel Point, formerly considered a headland of Arthur Harbour, marks its westernmost extremity.

== Geography ==
Three prominent rocks called the Elephant Rocks sit just to the south of Amsler Island, between the coast and Torgersen Island. The rocks are connected to one another by sandy shoals. Their name became established locally among United States Antarctic Program (USAP) personnel at nearby Palmer Station in about 1971, as the rocks provide habitat favoured by elephant seals.

== History ==
Amsler Island was once thought to be a part of Anvers Island because the gap between the islands was covered by the Marr Ice Piedmont. The southern coast of Anvers Island, including the land now known as Amsler Island, was originally surveyed by the Falkland Islands Dependencies Survey (FIDS) in 1955. Norsel Point, thought to be a point on the coast of Arthur Harbour, was named by the United Kingdom Antarctic Place-names Committee (UK-APC) after the Norwegian sealing vessel Norsel, which sailed with the FIDS survey.

Rapid recession of the ice due to global warming revealed Amsler Island as a separate island in 2004. The United States Board on Geographic Names named Amsler Island in recognition of American marine biologists Charles and Margaret Amsler of the University of Alabama at Birmingham, who had researched the area for over three decades. The name Norsel Point was retained.

Amsler Island was the original site of the United States Antarctic Program research base Palmer Station from 1965 until the current station approximately 0.8 km (0.5 mi) away was constructed in 1968.

== See also ==
- Composite Antarctic Gazetteer
- List of Antarctic islands south of 60° S
- SCAR
- Territorial claims in Antarctica
