= Eta Island (Palmer Archipelago) =

- Location within Antarctic Peninsula

Geography
- Location: Antarctica
- Coordinates: 64°19′S 62°55′W
- Archipelago: Melchior Islands, Palmer Archipelago
- Length: 3 km (1.9 mi)

Administration
- Administered under the Antarctic Treaty System

Demographics
- Population: Uninhabited

Eta Island is an island, 2.8 kilometres (1.5 nmi) long, which lies immediately north of Omega Island in the Melchior Islands, Palmer Archipelago. This island, the largest feature in the northeast part of the Melchior Islands, is part of what was called "Île Melchior" by the French Antarctic Expedition, 1903–05, under Jean-Baptiste Charcot, but the name Melchior now applies to the whole island group. Eta Island was roughly surveyed by Discovery Investigations personnel in 1927. The name, derived from eta, the seventh letter of the Greek alphabet, appears to have been first used on a 1946 Argentine government chart following surveys of the Melchior Islands by Argentine expeditions in 1942 and 1943.

== See also ==
- Composite Antarctic Gazetteer
- List of Antarctic islands south of 60° S
- Scientific Committee on Antarctic Research
- Territorial claims in Antarctica
- Andersen Harbor
