= Litchfield Island =

Island of Antarctica

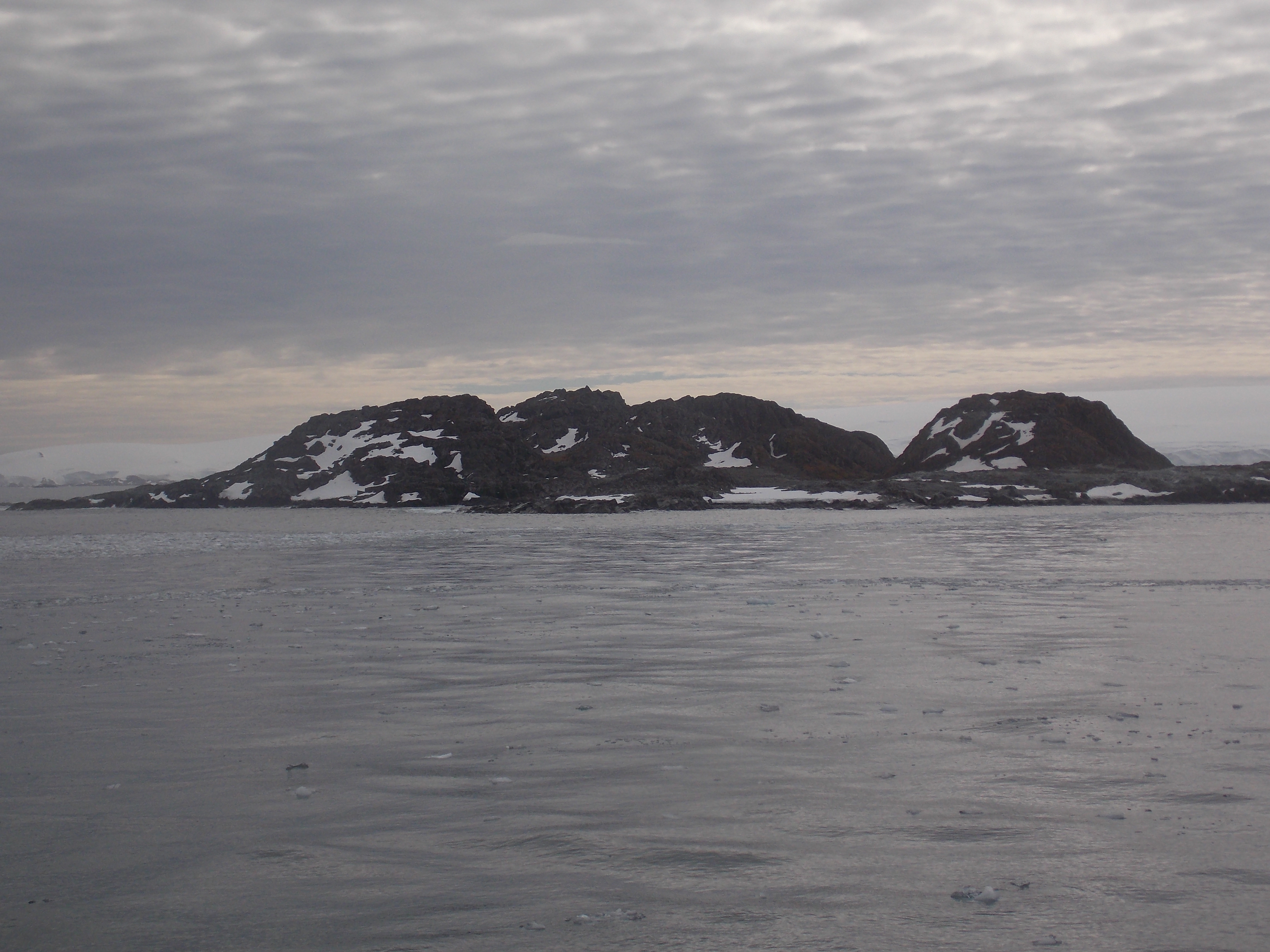

- Location within Antarctica

Geography
- Location: Antarctica
- Coordinates: 64°46′S 64°06′W
- Archipelago: Palmer Archipelago
- Length: 0.8 km (0.5 mi)
- Highest elevation: 50 m (160 ft)

Administration
- Administered under the Antarctic Treaty System

Demographics
- Population: Uninhabited

Litchfield Island is a rocky island 0.9 kilometres (0.5 nmi) long and rising to 50 m (164 ft), lying in Arthur Harbour, 0.9 kilometres (0.5 nmi) south of Norsel Point, off the south-west coast of Anvers Island in the Palmer Archipelago of Antarctica.

== History ==
Litchfield Island was surveyed by the Falkland Islands Dependencies Survey (FIDS) in 1955. It was named by the United Kingdom Antarctic Place-names Committee (UK-APC) for Douglas B. Litchfield of the Falkland Islands Dependencies Survey (FIDS), general assistant and mountaineer at the Arthur Harbour station in 1955, who helped with the local survey and made numerous soundings through the sea ice in the vicinity of the island.

== Environment ==
The island, together with its littoral zone, possesses an unusually high collection of marine and terrestrial life and is unique amongst the neighboring islands as a breeding place for six species of native birds. It provides an outstanding example of the natural ecological system of the Antarctic Peninsula area. In addition, Litchfield Island possesses rich growths of vegetation and has the most varied topography and the greatest diversity of terrestrial habitats of the islands in Arthur Harbour. For these reasons, it was designated an Antarctic Specially Protected Area (ASPA) in 1975 and is currently known as ASPA 113.

=== Important Bird Area ===
The island has been identified as an Important Bird Area (IBA) by BirdLife International because it supports a breeding colony of about 50 pairs of south polar skuas. Other birds nesting at the site include brown skuas, southern giant petrels, Wilson's storm petrels, Antarctic terns and kelp gulls. Formerly, some 1000 pairs of Adélie penguins also bred there. Southern elephant seals and Antarctic fur seals commonly haul out on the island.

== See also ==
- List of Antarctic and subantarctic islands
