= Omega Island =

Large island of the Melchior Islands

- Location in Antarctica

Geography
- Location: Antarctica
- Coordinates: 64°20′S 62°56′W
- Archipelago: Melchior Islands, Palmer Archipelago
- Length: 3.7 km (2.3 mi)

Administration
- Administered under the Antarctic Treaty System

Demographics
- Population: Uninhabited

Omega Island is an island 3.7 kilometres (2 nmi) long, which lies immediately south of Eta Island in the Melchior Islands, Palmer Archipelago. This island, the largest feature in the southeast part of the Melchior Islands, is part of what was called Île Melchior by the French Antarctic Expedition under Jean-Baptiste Charcot, 1903–05, but the name Melchior now applies for the whole island group. Omega Island was roughly surveyed by DI personnel in 1927. The name Omega, derived from the last letter of the Greek alphabet, appears to have been first used on a 1946 Argentine government chart following surveys of the Melchior Islands by Argentine expeditions in 1942 and 1943.

== See also ==
- Composite Antarctic Gazetteer
- List of Antarctic and sub-Antarctic islands
- List of Antarctic islands south of 60° S
- SCAR
- Territorial claims in Antarctica
- Andersen Harbor
