= Melchior Islands =

Group of many islands in Antarctica

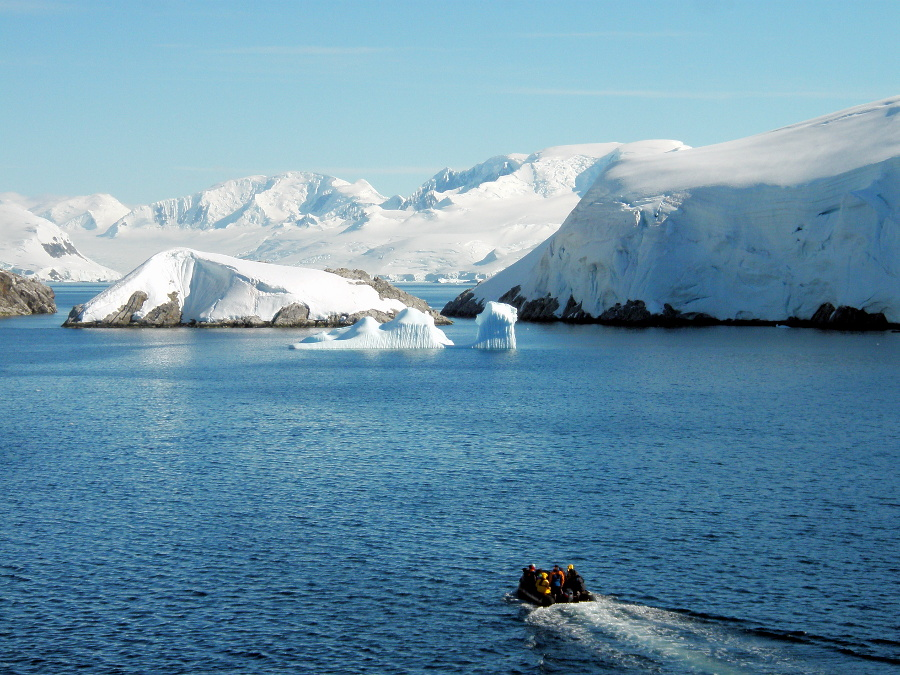

- Location of the Melchior Islands

- Location in Antarctica

Geography
- Location: Antarctica
- Coordinates: 64°19′S 62°57′W
- Archipelago: Palmer Archipelago
- Major islands: Eta Island, Omega Island

Administration
- Administered under the Antarctic Treaty System

Demographics
- Population: Data not available

Map of the Melchior Islands

The Melchior Islands are a group of many low, ice-covered islands lying near the center of Dallmann Bay between Brabant Island and Anvers Island in the Palmer Archipelago, Antarctica. They were first seen but left unnamed by a German expedition under Eduard Dallmann, 1873–74. The islands were resighted and roughly charted by the Third French Antarctic Expedition under Jean-Baptiste Charcot, 1903–1905.

Charcot named what he believed to be the large easternmost island in the group "Île Melchior" after Vice Admiral Jules Melchior of the French Navy, but later surveys proved Charcot's Île Melchior to be two islands, now called Eta Island and Omega Island. The name Melchior Islands has since become established for the whole island group now described, of which Eta Island and Omega Island form the eastern part, while the Sigma Islands mark the northern limit of the islands. The group was roughly surveyed in 1927 by Discovery Investigations personnel in the RRS Discovery, and was resurveyed by Argentine expeditions in 1942 and 1943, and again in 1948.

The semi-circular arrangement of Lambda, Epsilon, Alpha and Delta Islands forms a small harbor called Inner Harbor. Its descriptive name was probably given by Discovery Investigations personnel who roughly surveyed the harbor in 1927. It was resurveyed by Argentine expeditions in 1942, 1943 and 1948.

== Islands ==
- Alpha Island
- Beta Island
- Bremen Island
- Delta Island
- Epsilon Island
- Eta Island
- Gamma Island
- Kappa Island
- Lambda Island
- Omega Island
- Omicron Islands
- Pabellon Island
- Pi Islands
- Psi Islands
- Rho Islands
- Sigma Islands
- Tau Islands
- Theta Islands
- Tripod Island

== Features ==
- Harpun Rocks
- Normanna Reef

== See also ==
- West Melchior Islands
- East Melchior Islands
- Anvers Island Geology
- Gerlache Strait Geology
- Composite Antarctic Gazetteer
- List of Antarctic islands south of 60° S
- Scientific Committee on Antarctic Research
- Territorial claims in Antarctica
