= Palmer Archipelago =

Group of islands off the northwestern coast of the Antarctic Peninsula

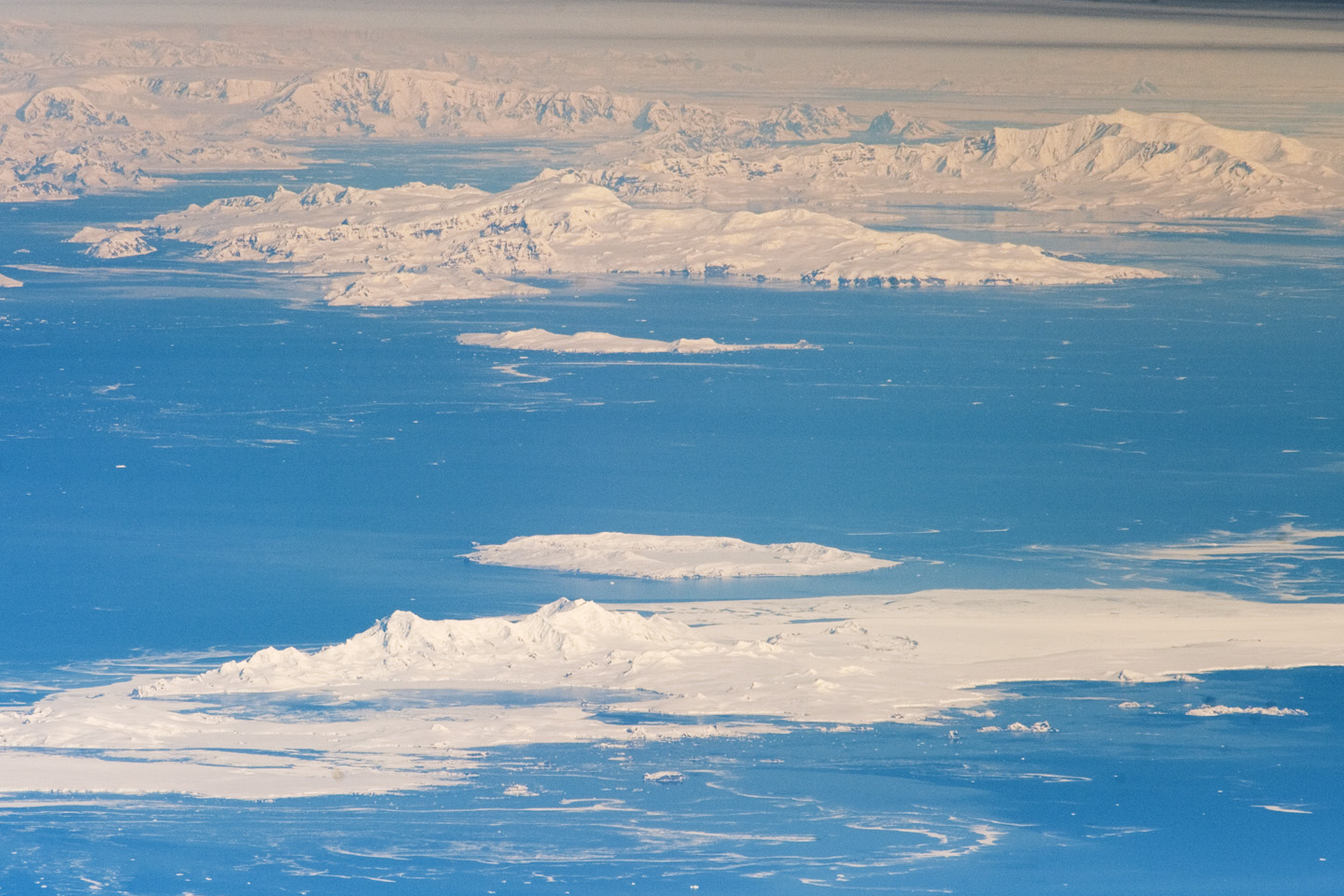
- Hoseason, Liege, Brabant and Anvers Islands shown behind Livingston and Deception Islands of the South Shetland Islands

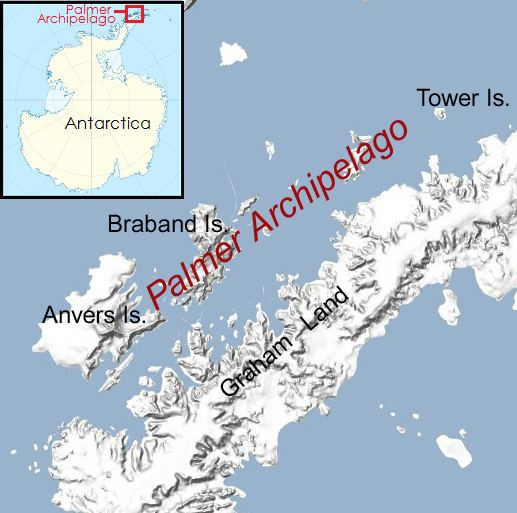
- Map of Palmer Archipelago, showing its location in Antarctica

Geography
- Location: Antarctica
- Coordinates: 64°15′S 62°50′W

Administration
- Administered under the Antarctic Treaty System

Demographics
- Population: Data not available

The Palmer Archipelago, also known as the Antarctic Archipelago, Archipiélago Palmer, Antarktiske Arkipel or Palmer Inseln, is a group of islands off the northwestern coast of the Antarctic Peninsula. It extends from Tower Island in the north to Anvers Island in the south. It is separated by the Gerlache and Bismarck straits from the Antarctic Peninsula and Wilhelm Archipelago, respectively. The archipelago is in the British, Chilean, and Argentine Claims.

The archipelago is located at 64°15′S 62°50′W.

== History ==
Adrien de Gerlache, leader of the Belgian Antarctic Expedition (1897–1899), discovered the archipelago in 1898. He named it Archipelago Palmer for American Captain Nathaniel Palmer, who navigated these waters in 1820.

Both Argentina and the United Kingdom have operated research stations there.

== Islands ==
The archipelago includes:

- Abbott Island
- Amsler Island
- Anvers Island
- Auguste Island
- Bob Island
- Brabant Island
- Buff Island
- Chionis Island
- Christiania Islands
- Chukovezer Island
- Cobalcescou Island
- Cormorant Island
- Davis Island
- Dink Island
- Doumer Island
- Dream Island
- Emen Island
- Fridtjof Island
- Gand Island
- Halfway Island
- Hermit Island
- Hoseason Island
- Humble Island
- Imelin Island
- Janus Island
- Joubin Islands
- Kalotina Island
- Lapteva Island
- Lecointe Island
- Litchfield Island
- Liège Island
- Masteyra Island
- Melchior Islands
  - Alpha Island
  - Beta Island
  - Bremen Island
  - Delta Island
  - Epsilon Island
  - Eta Island
  - Gamma Island
  - Kappa Island
  - Lambda Island
  - Omega Island
  - Pabellon Island
  - Pi Islands
  - Psi Islands
  - Rho Islands
  - Sigma Islands
  - Tau Islands
  - Theta Islands
  - Tripod Island
- Ohlin Island
- Pampa Island
- Petrelik Island
- Raklitsa Island
- Rogulyat Island
- Soatris Island
- Spert Island
- Spume Island
- Temenuga Island
- Tetrad Islands
- Torgersen Island
- Tower Island
- Trebishte Island
- Trinity Island
- Two Hummock Island
- Vázquez Island
- Vromos Island
- Walsham Rocks
- Wiencke Island
- Yoke Island
- Zigzag Island

== Gallery ==
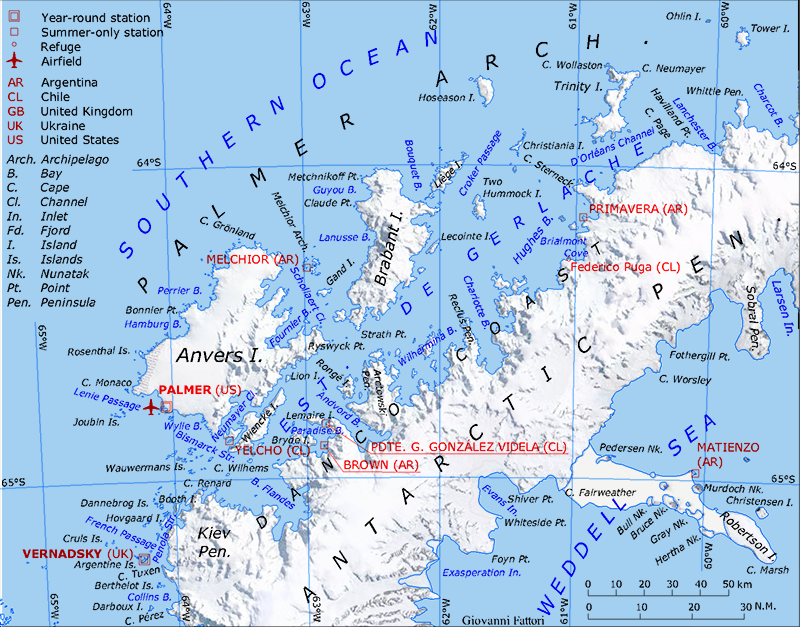
Map of Gerlache Strait and Palmer Archipelago

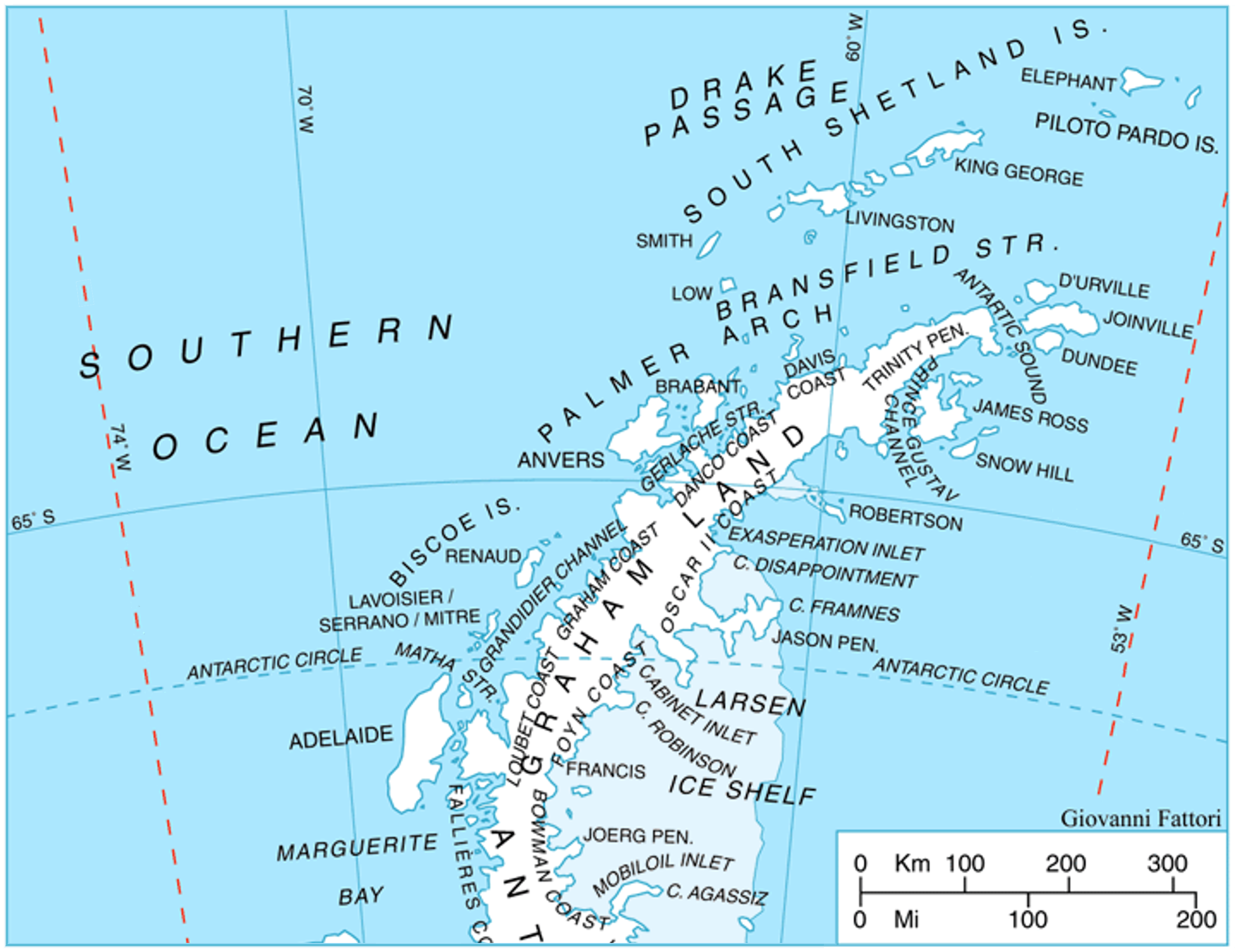
Locator (basemap) for the Palmer Archipelago, centered near 65°00′S 64°00′W

== See also ==
- Anvers Island Geology
- Gerlache Strait Geology
- Homeward Point
- List of Antarctic and sub-Antarctic islands
- List of Antarctic islands south of 60° S
