= Discovery Investigations =

Antarctic expedition

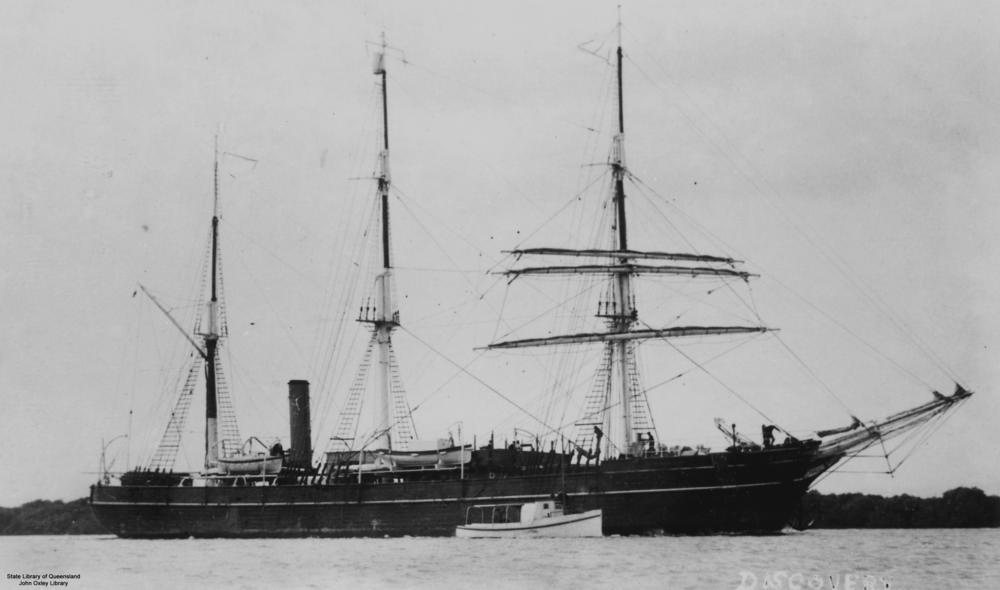
The former Antarctic exploration ship RRS Discovery was employed for the Discovery Investigations cruises between 1923 and 1931.

The Discovery Investigations were a series of scientific cruises and shore-based investigations into the biology of whales in the Southern Ocean. They were funded by the British Colonial Office and organised by the Discovery Committee in London, which was formed in 1918. They were intended to provide the scientific background to stock management of the commercial Antarctic whale fishery.

Discovery Investigations contributed greatly to knowledge of the whales, the krill they fed on and their habitat's oceanography, while charting the local topography, including Atherton Peak. They continued until 1951, with the final report published in 1980.

Collected specimens are in the Discovery Collections.

== Laboratory ==
Shore-based work on South Georgia took place in the marine laboratory, Discovery House, built in 1925 at King Edward Point and occupied until 1931. The scientists lived and worked in the building, travelling half a mile or so across King Edward Cove to the whaling station at Grytviken to work on whales as they were brought ashore by commercial whaling ships.

== Ships ==
Vessels used were:

- RRS Discovery from 1924 to 1931
- RRS William Scoresby from 1927 to 1945 or later
- RRS Discovery II from 1929 to 1951

== Reports ==
Results of the investigations were printed in the Discovery Reports. This was a series of many small reports, published in 38 volumes by the Cambridge University Press, and latterly the Institute of Oceanographic Sciences. Many were printed as individual reports rather than in large volumes.

=== List ===
Volume Pages/Plates/Charts	Title	Author	Published
Volume I
	List of Personnel		
pp. 1–140 Plates I - VI	Station List 1925 - 1927		January 1929
pp. 143–232 Plates VII - XVIII	Objects, Equipment and Methods	S Kemp ScD A C Hardy MA; N A Mackintosh ARCS MSc	July 1929
pp. 235–255 Plates XIX - XXIV	The Natural History of the Elephant Seal with Notes on Other Seals Found at South Georgia	L Harrison Matthews MA	July 1929
pp. 259–540 Plates XXV - XLIV	Southern Blue and Fin Whales	N A Mackintosh ARCS MSc J F G Wheeler MSc	December 1929
pp. 543–560	Parasitic Nematoda and Acanthocephala Collected in 1925 - 1927	H A Bayliss MA DSc	December 1929
pp. 563–592 Plates XLV - LVI	The Birds of South Georgia	L Harrison Matthews MA	December 1929
Volume II
pp. 3–222	Polychaete Worms	C C A Monroe MA	October 1930
pp. 225–260 Plate I	Thoracic Cirripedes Collected in 1925-1927	C A Nilsson-Cantell, Sweden	October 1930
pp. 263–370 Plate II	Oceanic Fishes and Flatfishes Collected in 1925 - 1927	J R Norman	October 1930
pp. 373–402 Plates III - IV	Cephalopoda, I. Octopoda	G C Robson MA	November 1930
pp. 405–434 Plate V	The Age of Fin Whales at Physical Maturity with a Note on Multiple Ovulations	J F G Wheeler MSc	January 1931
pp. 437–482 Plates VI - VII	The Anatomy of a Marine Ostracod Cypridina (Doloria) Levis Skogsberg	H Graham Cannon ScD	February 1931
Volume III
	List of Personnel January 1932		
pp. 3–132 Plates I - X	Station List 1927 - 1929		January 1931
pp. 135–198 Plates XI - XXXI	The South Sandwich Islands (With a report on Rock Specimens by GW Tyrrell ARCSc DSc FGS FRSE)	S Kemp ScD FRS A L Nelson RNR	November 1931
pp. 201–222 Plate XXXII	Nebaliacea	H Graham Cannon ScD	December 1931
pp. 225–260 Plates XXXIII - XXXVIII	Cephalodiscus	C C John MA	December 1931
pp. 263–268	Spiders Collected by the Discovery Expedition, with a Description of a New Species from South Georgia	W S Bristowe BA FZS	December 1931
pp. 269–296 Plate XXXIX	Mollusca: Gastropoda Thecosomata and Gymnosomata	Anne L Massy	March 1932
pp. 299–344 Plates XL - XLIV; Charts 1 - 4	Narrative of Hydrographic Survey Operations in South Georgia and the South Shetland Islands	Lt Cdr J M Chaplin RN	June 1932
Volume IV
pp. 3–230 Plates I - IV	Station List 1929 - 1931		July 1932
pp. 235–265	Oligochaeta. Part I. Microdrili (Mainly Enchytraeidae)	J Stephenson CIE MB DSc FRS	May 1932
pp. 267–291	Oligochaeta. Part II. Earthworms	Grace E Pickford PhD, Osborn Zoological Laboratory, Yale University	May 1932
pp 293 – 460v Plates VI - XVII	Foraminifera. Part I. The Ice-Free Area of the Falkland Islands and Adjacent Seas	Edward Heron-Allen FRS Arthur Earland FRMS	August 1932
Volume V
pp 3 – 326v Plate I	Amphipoda	K H Barnard DSc FLS	August 1932
pp. 329–363	The Vascular Networks (Retia Mirabilia) of the Fin Whale (Balaenoptera physalus)	F D Omanney ARCS BSc	September 1932
pp. 365–466 Plates II - III	The Uro-Genital System of the Fin Whale (Balaenoptera physalus)	F D Omanney ARCS BSc	September 1932
pp. 469–484 Plate IV	Lobster-krill: Anomuran Crustacea that are the Food of Whales	L Harrison Matthews MA	November 1932
Volume VI
pp. 1–138	Pycnogonida	Isabella Gordon DSc PhD, Assistant keeper in the Department of zoology, British Museum (Natural History)	December 1932
pp. 139–164 Plates I - VI	Report on Penguin Embryos Collected During the Discovery Investigations	C W Parsons BA, Lecturer in zoology at the University of Glasgow	December 1932
pp. 165–190 Plates VII - XLII	On the Distribution and Movements of Whales on the South Georgia and South Shetland Whaling Grounds	Stanley Kemp ScD FRS A G Bennett	December 1932
pp. 191–204 Plates XLIII - XLIV	On the Development of Cephalodiscus	C C John MA DSc DIC	December 1932
pp. 205–236 Plates XLV - XLVII; Charts 1 - 7	Report on Soundings Taken During the Discovery Investigations 1926 - 1932	H F P Herdman MSc	December 1932
pp. 237–392 Plates XLVIII-LVII	Sponges	Maurice Burton MSc, Assistant-Keeper, Department of Zoology, British Museum (Nat. Hist.)	December 1932
Volume VII
pp. 3–15	Fossil Forminifera from the Burdwood Bank and their Geological Significance	W A Macfadyen MC MA PhD FGS	February 1933
pp. 17–27	Faecal Pellets from Marine Deposits	Hilary B Moore BSc	March 1933
pp. 29–138 Plates 1 - VII	Foraminifera. Part II, South Georgia	Arthur Earland FRSE FRMS	June 1933
pp. 139–170	On Vertical Circulation in the Ocean due to the Action of the Wind with Application to Conditions within the Antarctic Circumpolar Current	H U Sverdrup	November 1933
pp. 173–238 Plates VIII - X	A General Account of the Hydrology of the South Atlantic Ocean	G E R Deacon BSc	November 1933
pp. 241–252 Plates XI - XIII	Whaling in the Dominion of New Zealand	F D Ommanney ARCS BSc	December 1933
pp. 255–362 Plate XIV	Isopod Crustacea. Part I, The Family Serolidae	Edith M Sheppard MSc	December 1933
pp. 365–406 Plate XV	Some Aspects of Respiration in Blue and Fin Whales	Alec H Laurie MA	December 1933
Volume VIII
	List of Personnel March 1934		
pp. 3–270	On the Phytoplankton of the South-West Atlantic and the Bellingshausen Sea	T John Hart BSc	January 1934
pp. 271–318 Plates I - XIII	The Southern Sea Lion, Otaria byronia (De Blainville)	J E Hamilton MSc	January 1934
pp. 321–330	On a New Species of Mite of the Family Halarachnidae from the Southern Sea Lion	Susan Finnegan BSc PhD	January 1934
pp. 331–396 Plates XIV - XV	Scyphomedusae	G Stiasny DSC, Leiden	February 1934
Volume IX
pp. 3–66	Hydrology of the Bransfield Strait	A J Clowes M.Sc. ARCS	February 1934
pp. 67–160	Distribution of the Macroplankton in the Atlantic Sector of the Antarctic	N A Mackintosh D.Sc	April 1934
pp. 163–174 Plate I	The Sub-Antarctic Forms of the Great Skua (Catharacta skua skua)	J E Hamilton M.Sc.	June 1934
pp. 177–206 Plates II - XIV	The Marine Deposits of the Patagonian Shelf	L Harrison Matthews MA	August 1934
pp. 209–216	The Development of Rhincalanus	Robert Gurney	September 1934
pp. 217–294 Plates XV - XVI	Nemerteans from the South Atlantic and Southern Oceans	J F G Wheeler D.Sc.	November 1934
pp. 297–350 Plates XVI - XXII	The Sea Floor Deposits. I General Characteristics and Distribution	E Neaverson DSc FGS	December 1934
pp. 351–372	On the Stock of Whales at South Georgia	J FG Wheeler D.Sc.	December 1934
Volume X
pp. 3–210 Plates I-X	Foraminifera, Part III. The Falklands Sector of the Antarctic (Excluding South Georgia)	Arthur Earland FRMS	December 1934
pp. 211–248	The Falkland Species of the Crustacean Genus Munida	G W Rayner BSc	April 1935
pp. 249–282 Plate XI	On the Diatoms of the Skin Film of Whales, and their Possible Bearing on Problems of Whale Movements	T John Hart MSc	June 1935
pp. 285–382 Plates XII - XXV	The South Orkney Islands	James W S Marr MA BSc	November 1935
pp. 383–390	Report on Rocks from the South Orkney Islands	CE Tilley BSc PhD	December 1935
Volume XI
pp. 1–456	The Plankton of the South Georgia Whaling Grounds and Adjacent Waters	A C Hardy MA ER Gunther MA	November 1935
pp. 457–510	The Continuous Plankton Recorder	A C Hardy MA	December 1936
pp. 511–538	Observations on the Uneven Distribution of Oceanic Plankton	A C Hardy MA	November 1936
Volume XII
	List of Personnel 1936		
pp. 1–58	Coast Fishes. Part I. The South Atlantic	J R Norman	December 1935
pp. 59–198	Polychaete Worms	C C A Monro MA	January 1936
pp. 199–348 Plates I - IX	Echinoidea and Ophiuroidea	Th. Mortensen	March 1936
pp. 349–378 Plates X - XII	The Birds of the South Orkney Islands	R A B Ardley RNR	February 1936
pp. 379–440	Larvae of Decapod Crustecea	Robert Gurney DSc	September 1936
Volume XIII
pp. 1–76 Plates I - IIa	Foraminifera. Part IV, Additional Records from the Weddell Sea Sector from Material Obtained by the SY Scotia With a report on Some Crystalline Components of the Weddell Sea Deposits. by FA Bannister MA	Arthur Earland FRMS	September 1936
pp. 77–106	The Royal Research Ship Discovery II	R A B Ardley RNR N A Mackintosh DSc	July 1936
pp. 109–276 Plates XIV - XVI	A Report on Oceanographical Investigations in the Peru Coastal Current	E R Gunther MA	October 1936
pp. 277–384	Rhincalanus Gigas (Brady) A Copepod of the Southern Macroplankton	F D Ommanney PhD ARCS	October 1936
Volume XIV
pp. 1–192	On the Development and Distribution of the Young Stages of Krill (Euphausia superba)	F C Fraser BSc	December 1936
pp. 193–324	The Southern Species of the genus Euphausia	D. Dilwyn John	14 December 1936
pp. 325-350; Plates I - V	The reproductive system of Euphausia superba	Helene E. Bargmann PhD	25 June 1937
pp. 351–404	Larvae of Decapod Crustacea. Part IV. Hippolytidae	Robert Gurney DSc	June 1937
Volume XV
pp. 1–124	The Hydrology of the Southern Ocean	G E R Deacon BSc	March 1937
pp. 125–152	Note on the Dynamics of the southern Ocean	G E R Deacon	March 1937
pp. 153–222	New Species of Marine Mollusca from New Zealand	A W B Powell	March 1937
pp. 223–284	The Age of Female Blue Whales and the Effect of Whaling on the Stock	Alec H Laurie MA	May 1937
Volume XVI
pp. 1–150 Plates I - V	Coast Fishes. Part II. The Patagonian Region	J R Norman	February 1937
pp. 151–364 Plates VI - XIII	The Plankton Diatoms of the Southern Seas	N Ingram Hendey FLS FRMS	April 1937
pp. 365–412	The Seasonal Circulation of the Antarctic Macroplankton	N A Mackintosh DSc	April 1937
pp. 413–446 Plate XIV	Rhizosolenia curvata Zacharias, an Indicator Species in the Southern Ocean	T John Hart DSc	May 1937
Volume XVII
pp. 1–6 Plate I	On the Histological Structure of Cetacean Lungs	F Haynes MA Alec H Laurie MA	July 1937
pp. 9–92 Plate II	The Humpback Whale, Megaptera nodosa	L. Harrison Matthews, M.A.	January 1938
pp. 95-168 Plates III-XI	The Sperm Whale, Physeter catodon	L. Harrison Matthews, M.A.	March 1938
pp. 169-182 Plates XII-XVII	Notes On The Southern Right Whale, Eubalaena australis	L. Harrison Matthews, M.A.	April 1938
pp. 185-290 Plates XVIII, XIX	The Sei Whale, Balaenoptera borealis	L. Harrison Matthews, M.A.	June 1938
pp. 291–344	Larvae of Decapod Crustecea. Part V. Nephropsidea and Thalassinidea	Robert Gurney D.Sc.	July 1938
Volume XVIII
pp. 1–104 Plate I	Coast Fishes. Part III. The Antarctic Zone	J R Norman	May 1938
pp105 – 120 Plate II	On the Operation of Large Plankton Nets	James W S Marr MA BSc	August 1938
pp. 121–222 Plates III - VI	Crinoidea	D Dilwyn John MSc	October 1938
pp. 223–238	Thoracic Cirripeded Collected in 1925 - 1936	C A Nilsson-Cantell, Sweden	January 1939
pp. 239–264 Plates VII - XIII	The Leopard Seal Hydrurga leptonyx (De Blainville)	J E Hamilton MSc	October 1939
pp. 265–322 Plates XIV - XIX	Hydromedusae from the Falkland Islands	Edward T Browne PL Kramp	November 1939
pp. 323–338 Plates XX - XXI	Madreporarian Corals, with an Account of Variation in Carophyllia	J Stanley Gardiner MS FRS	November 1939
Volume XIX
pp. 1–120 Plates I - XXV	Phosphate and Silicate in the Southern Ocean	A J Clowes MSc ARCS	October 1938
pp. 121–164 Plates XXVII - XXXIII	A Second Report on the Southern Sea Lion, Otaria Byronia (De Blainville)	J E Hamilton MSc	December 1939
pp. 165–184 Plates XXXIV - XXXVIII	MacRobertson Land and Kemp Land, 1936 With a Report on Rock Specimens by CE Tilley FRS	George W Rayner	May 1940
pp. 185–244 Plates XXXIX - XLII	On the Anatomy of Gigantocypris Mulleri	H Graham Cannon ScD FRCS	July 1940
pp. 245–284 Plates XLIII - LXVIII	Whale Marking, Progress and Results to December 1939	George W Rayner	July 1940
pp. 285–296 Plates LXIX - XCV	Distribution of the Pack Ice in the Southern Ocean	N A Mackintosh DSc HFP Herdman MSc	July 1940
Volume XX
pp. 1–68	Larvae of Decapod Crustacea. Part VI. The Genus Sergestes	R Gurney and M V Lebour	July 1940
pp. 69–306 Plates I - XXIII	Asteroidea	Walter K Fisher	November 1940
pp. 307–382 Plates XXIV - XXVI	On the Structure of the Photophores of some Decapod Crustacea	Ralph Dennell DSc	December 1940
Volume XXI
pp. 1–226 Plates I - IV	Station List 1931 - 1933		February 1941
pp. 227–234 Plates V - VI	A Rare Porpoise of the South Atlantic, Phocaena dioptrica (Lahille, 1912)	J E Hamilton DSc	February 1941
pp. 235–260 Plates VII - VIII	The Euchiuridae, Sipunculidae and Priapulidae Collected by the Ships of the Discovery Committee During the Years 1926 to 1937	A C Stephen DSc	October 1941
pp. 261–356	Phytoplankton Periodicity in Antarctic Surface Waters	T John Hart DSc	October 1942
Volume XXII
pp. 1–196 Plate I - IV	Station List 1933 - 1935		March 1942
pp. 197–300	The Southern Stocks of Whalebone Whales	N A Mackintosh DSc	June 1942
pp. 301–510 Plates V - XIII	Polyzoa (Bryozoa) I. Scrupocellariidae, Epistomiidae, Farciminariidae, Bicellariellidae, Aeteidae, Scrupariidae	Anna B Hastings MA PhD British Museum (Natural History)	September 1943
Volume XXIII
pp. 1–18	The Gut of Nebaliacea	Helen G Q Rowett	October 1943
pp. 19–36	On a Specimen of the Southern Bottlenosed Whale, Hyperoodon planifrons	F C Fraser DSc	March 1945
pp 37 – 102	Report on Rocks from West Antarctica and the Scotia Arc	G W Tyrell ARCSc DSc FGS FRSE	June 1945
pp. 103–176	The Development and Life-History of Adolescent and Adult Krill, Euphausia superba	Helene E Bargmann PhD	June 1945
pp. 177–212 Plates I - XIV	The Antarctic Convergence and the Distribution of Surface Temperatures in Antarctic Waters	N A Mackintosh DSc	January 1946
pp. 213–222 Plate XV	Nebalipsis typica	H Graham Cannon ScD FRS	August 1946
pp. 223–408 Plate XVI	Report on the Trawling Surveys on the Patagonian Continental Shelf Compiled mainly from manuscripts left by the late ER Gunther MA	T John Hart DSc	December 1946
Volume XXIV
pp. 1–196 Plates I - III	Station List 1935 - 1937		November 1944
pp. 197–422 Plates IV - VI	Station List 1937 - 1939		April 1947
Volume XXV
pp. 1–30 Plates I - IV	Antarctic Pyrenocarp Lichens	I Mackenzie Lamb D.Sc.	March 1948
pp. 31–38 Plates V - XXII	Whale Marking II. Distribution of Blue, Fin and Humpback Whales Marked from 1932 to 1938	George W Rayner	May 1948
pp. 39–106 Plates XXIII - XXXI	Soundings Taken During the Discovery Investigations, 1932–39	H F P Herdman M.Sc.	September 1948
pp. 107–112 Plate XXXII	On the Reproductive Organs of Holozoa Cylindrica Lesson	Dr A Arnback Christie-Linde	March 1949
pp. 143–280 Plates XXXIV - XXXVII	Discovery Investigations Station List RRS William Scoresby 1931 - 1938		September 1949
pp. 281–314 Plates XXXVIII - XLI	Ellobiopsidae	Dr H Boschma FMLS CMZS	November 1949
Volume XXVI
pp. 1–32 Plate I	The Bathypelagic Angler Fish Ceratias holbölli Kröyer	Robert Clarke MA	September 1950
pp. 33–46 Plates II - IV	Stylasteridae (Hydrocorals) from Southern Seas	Prof. Hjalmar Broch University of Oslo	January 1951
pp. 47–196 Plates V - X	Antarctic and Subantarctic Mollusca: Pelecypoda and Gastropoda	A W B Powell FRSNZ	March 1951
pp. 197–210	The Vampyromorpha of the Discovery Expeditions	Grace E Pickford	July 1952
pp. 211–258 Plates XI - XII	Discovery Investigations Station List RRS William Scoresby 1950		April 1953
pp. 259–280	A Preliminary Report on the Ostracoda of the Benguela Current	E J Iles	October 1953
pp. 281–354 Plates XIII - XVIII	Open Boat Whaling in the Azores: The History and Present Methods of a Relic Industry	Robert Clarke MA	February 1954
pp. 355–384	Dispersal in Blue and Fin Whales	S G Brown	January 1954
Volume XXVII
pp. 1–162 Plates I - XII	Siphonophora of the Indian Ocean Together with Systematic and Biological Notes on Related Specimens from Other Oceans	A K Totton British Museum (Natural History)	April 1954
pp. 163–200	The Pelagic Mollusca of the Benguela Current Part I. First Survey RRS William Scoresby March 1950; With an Account of the Reproductive System and Sexual Succession of Limacina bulimoides	J E Morton PhD	August 1954
pp. 201–208	The Circumpolar Continuity of Antarctic Plankton Species	A de C Baker National Institute of Oceanography	August 1954
pp. 219–234	The Planktonic Decapod Crustacea and Stomatopoda of the Benguela Current Part I. First Survey RRS William Scoresby March 1950	Marie V Lebour DSc	October 1954
pp. 235–278 Plate XIII	The Distribution of Sagitta gazella Ritter-Zahony	P M David	April 1955
pp. 279–291	Cumacea of the Benguela Current	N S Jones PhD Marine Biological Station, Port Erin	June 1955
pp. 293–302 Plates XIV - XVIII	The Wax Plug in the External Auditory Meatus of the Mysticeti	P E Purves Dept of Zoology, British Museum (Nat. Hist.)	July 1955
pp. 337–376	Euphausiacea of the Benguela Current First Survey, RRS William Scoresby, March 1950	Brian P Boden	August 1955
pp. 377–395 Plates XX - XXI	Cestodes of Whales and Dolphins from the Discovery Collections	S Markowski	September 1955
Volume XXVIII
pp. 1–190	Mysidacea	Olive S Tattersall DSc	November 1955
pp. 191–236	The Distribution of the Standing Crop of Zooplankton in the Southern Ocean	P Foxton	April 1956
pp. 237–298 Plates I - II	Sperm Whales of the Azores	Robert Clarke	December 1956
pp. 299–398 Plates III - V	Station List 1950 - 1951		November 1955
Volume XXIX
pp. 1–128 Plates I - VII	Hydromedusae from the Discovery Collections	P L Kramp	February 1957
pp. 129–140	New Observations on the Aberrant Medusa Tetraplatia volitans Busch	Willam J Rees and Ernest White British Museum (Natural History)	February 1957
pp. 141–198 Plates VIII - IX	Isopod Crustacea Part II. The Sub-order Valvifera. Families: Idoteidae, Pseudidotheidae and Xenarctuidae Fam.N. With a Supplement to Isopod Crustacea, Part I. The Family Serolidae	Edith M Shephard Department of Zoology, Cardiff	September 1957
pp. 199–228 Plates X	The Distribution of the Chaetognatha of the Southern Ocean	P M David	April 1958
pp. 229–244	The Reliability of Deep-Sea Reversing Thermometers	H F P Herdman and L H Pemberton	May 1958
pp. 245–280 Plates XI - XII	Octocorals Part I. Pennaturalarians	Hjalmar Broch The Zoological Laboratory, Oslo-Blindern, Norway	December 1958
pp. 281–308 Plate XIII	The Foetal Growth Rates of Whales with Special Reference to the Fin Whale, Balaenoptera Physalus Linn.	R M Laws National Institute of Oceanography	March 1959
pp. 309–340	The Distribution and Life History of Euphausia triacantha Holt and Tatersall	A de C Baker	April 1959
Volume XXX
pp. 1–160 Plates I - VI	Ascidiacea	R H Millar	February 1960
pp. 161–300	The Distribution of Pelagic Polychaetes in the South Atlantic Ocean	Norman Tebble British Museum (Natural History)	April 1960
pp. 301–408 Plates VII - XXVIII	Studies on Physalia physalis (L.) Part I. Natural History and Morphology; Part II. Behaviour and Histology	A K Totton; G O Mackie	August 1960
Volume XXXI
pp. 1–122 Plates I - III	Swimbladder Structure of Deep-Sea Fishes in Relation to Their Systematics and Biology	N B Marshall British Museum (Natural History)	November 1960
pp. 123–298	The Benguela Current	T John Hart Ronald I Currie	November 1960
pp. 299–326	The Appendages of the Halocyprididae	E J Iles Dept. Zoology, Univ. of Manchester	February 1961
pp. 327–486 Plates IV - VII	Reproduction, Growth and Age of Southern Fin Whales	R M Laws	November 1961
Volume XXXII
pp. 1–32 Plates I - II	Salpa fusiformis Cuvier and Related Species	P Foxton	October 1961
33 - 464 Plate III	The Natural History and Geography of the Antarctic Krill (Euphausia superba Dana)	James Marr	November 1962
Volume XXXIII
pp. 1–54 Charts 1 - 11	The Movements of Fin and Blue Whales within the Antarctic Zone	S G Brown	March 1962
pp. 55–92 Plate I	Rhizocephala	H Boschma Rijksmuseum van Ntuurijke Historie, Leiden	November 1962
pp. 93–250 Plates II - VII	Antarctic and Subantarctic Mollusca: Amphineura, Scaphopoda and Bivalva	R K Dell Dominion Museum, Wellington, New Zealand	November 1964
pp. 251–307 Plates VIII - XXI	Larves de Cerianthaires	E Leloup Institut royal des Sciences naturelles de Belgique	November 1964
pp. 309–334	The Latitudinal Distribution of Euphausia Species in the Surface Waters of the Indian Ocean	A de C Baker National Institute of Oceanography, Wormley, Godalming, Surrey	April 1965
pp. 335–384 Plates XXII - XXVI	Development of the stolon in Salpa fusiformis Cuvier and Salpa aspera Chamisso	R M Sawicki Rothamstead Experimental Station	April 1966
Volume XXXIV
pp. 1–116	The Distribution and Life-History of Salpa Thompsoni Foxton with Observations on a Related Species, Salpa Gerlachei Foxton	P Foxton	July 1966
pp. 117–162	The Distribution and Life-History of Calanoides acutus (Giesbrecht)	Keith J H Andrews	September 1966
pp. 163–198	The Distribution of Parathemisto Gaudichaudii (Guer), with Observations on its Life-History in the 0° - 20° E Sector of the Southern Ocean	Jasmine E Kane	October 1966
pp. 199–394 Plates 1 - 17	Polyzoa (Bryozoa) - Ascophora - from North New Zealand	Neil Andrew Powell National Museum of Canada, Ottawa	September 1967
Volume XXXV
pp. 1–30 Plates I - IV	Seasonal Formation of Laminae in the Ear Plug of the Fin Whale	H S J Roe Whale Research Unit, National Institute of Oceanography	September 1967
pp. 31–134	Seasonal Cycles and Reproduction in Sei Whales of the Southern Hemisphere	Ray Gambell Whale Research Unit, National Institute of Oceanography	September 1968
pp. 135–178	Spirorbis Species (Polychaeta: Serpulidae) From the South Atlantic	Tegwyn Harris Department of Zoology, Exeter University	September 1969
pp. 179–198 Plates V - VI	On Ihlea Magalhanica (Apstein) (Tunicata: Salpidae) and Ihlea Racovitzai (Van Beneden)	P Foxton National Institute of Oceanography	January 1971
pp. 199-358	Sperm whales off Durban	R Gambell Whale Research Unit, National Institute of Oceanography	1972
Volume XXXVI
pp. 1–94	Life Cycle of Antarctic Krill in Relation to Ice and Water Conditions	N A Mackintosh Natural Environment Research Council	February 1972
pp. 95–156 Plates I - XVII	Distribution of Post-Larval Krill in the Antarctic	N A Mackintosh Natural Environment Research Council	December 1973
pp. 157–178	Sizes of Krill Eaten by Whales in the Antarctic	N A Mackintosh Natural Environment Research Council	April 1974
pp. 179–266	Monogena and Digena from Fishes	David I Gibson British Museum (Natural History)	February 1976
Volume XXXVII
pp. 1–324	Cephalopoda in the Diet of Sperm Whales of the Southern Hemisphere and their Bearing on Sperm Whale Biology	Malcolm R Clarke Marine Biological Association of the United Kingdom, Plymouth	March 1980

== Books ==
The Discovery Investigations are described in the following books, all of which were out of print in 2008:

- Hardy, Alister Clavering, Sir (1968). Great Waters. New York: Harper & Row.
- Ommanney, F. D. (1938). South Latitude. London: Longmans, Green and Co.
- Coleman-Cooke, John (1963). Discovery II In The Antarctic. London: Odhams Press.
- Saunders, Alfred (1950). A Camera in Antarctica. London: Winchester Publications.
