= Lipen Glacier =

Glacier in Antarctica

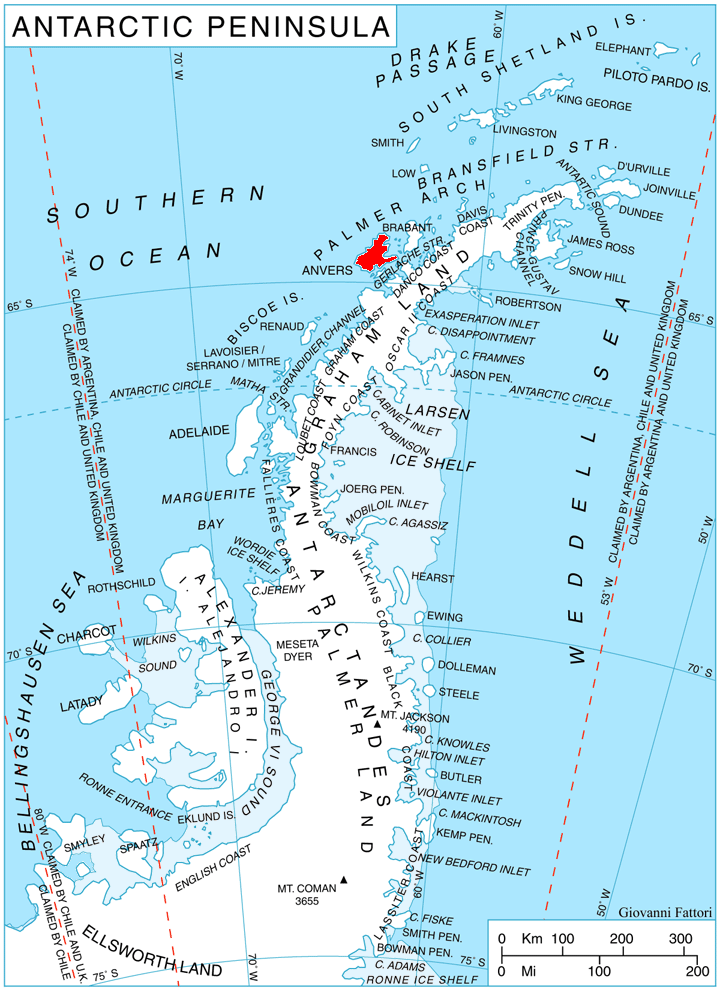
- Location of Anvers Island in the Antarctic Peninsula region

- Location within Antarctica
- Location: Palmer Archipelago
- Coordinates: 64°29′15″S 63°16′30″W
- Length: 3 nmi (6 km; 3 mi)
- Width: 2 nmi (4 km; 2 mi)
- Thickness: unknown
- Terminus: Patagonia Bay
- Status: unknown

Lipen Glacier (Bulgarian: ледник Липен, romanized: lednik Lipen, IPA: [ˈlɛdnik ˈlipɛn]) is a 5 km long and 3.5 km wide glacier draining the east slopes of the Trojan Range on Anvers Island in the Palmer Archipelago, Antarctica. Situated east of Iliad Glacier and north of Rhesus Glacier. Flowing northeastwards into the head of Patagonia Bay east of Gourdon Peninsula and west of Thompson Peninsula.

The glacier is named after the settlement of Lipen in northwestern Bulgaria.

== Location ==
Lipen Glacier is centred at 64°29′15″S 63°16′30″W. British mapping in 1980.

== See also ==
- List of glaciers in the Antarctic
- Glaciology

== Maps ==
- British Antarctic Territory. Scale 1:200000 topographic map No. 3217. DOS 610 - W 64 62. Tolworth, UK, 1980.
- Antarctic Digital Database (ADD). Scale 1:250000 topographic map of Antarctica. Scientific Committee on Antarctic Research (SCAR), 1993–2016.
