= Head Island =

Island in Antarctica

- Location within Antarctica

Geography
- Location: Antarctica
- Coordinates: 64°31′S 62°55′W

Administration
- Administered under the Antarctic Treaty System

Demographics
- Population: Uninhabited

Head Island is a small island that lies 1.1 kilometres (0.6 nmi) south of Andrews Point and close to the northeast side of Anvers Island, Antarctica. The feature is situated at the southeast side of Hackapike Bay and is not to be confused with Pear Island and False Island which are just northeastward. Head Island was charted from the Penola by the British Graham Land Expedition (1934–37) under John Rymill. The name is presumed to be descriptive and dates back to about 1952.

== See also ==
- List of Antarctic and sub-Antarctic islands
