= Rhesus Glacier =

Glacier in Antarctica

- Location of Brabant Island in the Antarctic Peninsula region

- Location within Antarctica
- Location: Palmer Archipelago
- Coordinates: 64°31′35″S 63°17′00″W
- Length: 4 nmi (7 km; 5 mi)
- Width: 1 nmi (2 km; 1 mi)
- Thickness: unknown
- Terminus: Fournier Bay
- Status: unknown

Rhesus Glacier (Bulgarian: ледник Резос, romanized: lednik Rezos, IPA: [ˈlɛdnik ˈrɛzos]) is a 7 km long and 2.5 km wide glacier draining the east slopes of the Trojan Range on Anvers Island in the Palmer Archipelago, Antarctica southeast of Paris Peak. Situated east of Iliad Glacier, south of Lipen Glacier and north of Thamyris Glacier. Flowing northeastwards into Fournier Bay south of Thompson Peninsula and north of Predel Point.

The glacier is named after the King Rhesus of Thrace in Homer's Iliad.

== Location ==
Rhesus Glacier is located at 64°31′35″S 63°17′00″W. British mapping in 1980.

== See also ==
- List of glaciers in the Antarctic
- Glaciology

== Maps ==
- British Antarctic Territory. Scale 1:200000 topographic map No. 3217. DOS 610 - W 64 62. Tolworth, UK, 1980.
- Antarctic Digital Database (ADD). Scale 1:250000 topographic map of Antarctica. Scientific Committee on Antarctic Research (SCAR). Since 1993, regularly upgraded and updated.
