= Deliradev Point =

Point in the Palmer Archipelago, Antarctica

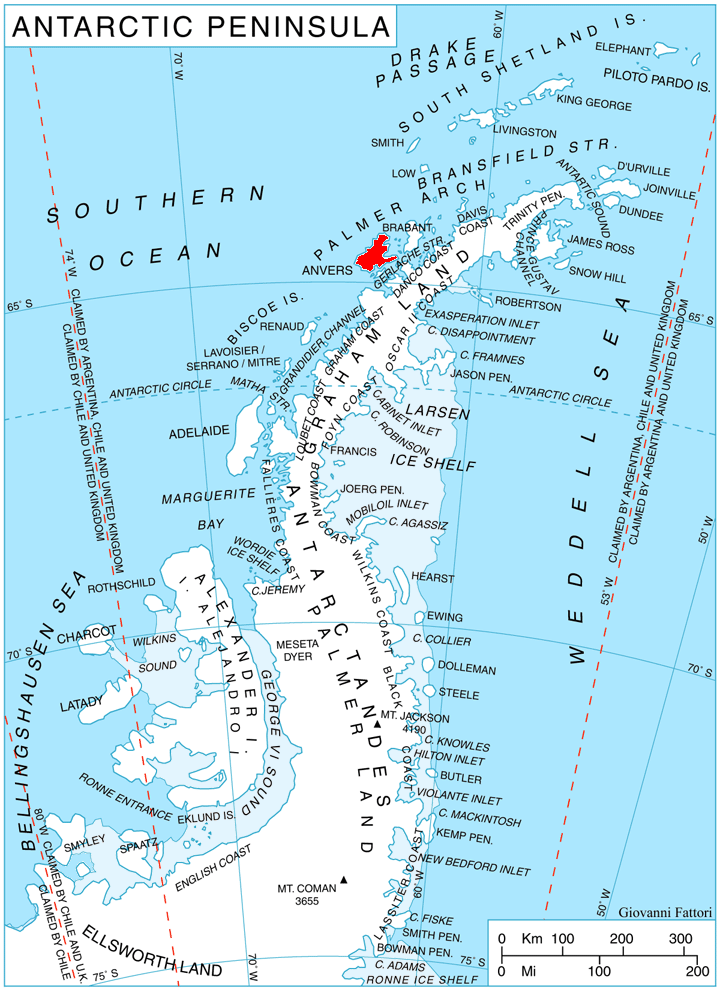
Location of Anvers Island in the Antarctic Peninsula region.

Deliradev Point (Bulgarian: Делирадев нос, ‘Deliradev Nos’ \de-'li-ra-dev 'nos\) is the point forming the south side of the entrance to Galata Cove and the north side of the entrance to Lapeyrère Bay on the northeast coast of Anvers Island in the Palmer Archipelago, Antarctica.

The point is named after the Bulgarian geographer, mountaineer and publicist Pavel Deliradev (1879-1957).

== Location ==
Deliradev Point is located at 64°19′41″S 63°09′26″W, which is 5.85 km south by east of Cape Bayle, 1.93 km south of Frolosh Point, 7.13 km west by south of Theta Islands in Melchior Islands, 7.44 km north by west of Gourdon Point and 7.77 km northeast of Bonete Point. British mapping in 1980.

== Maps ==
- British Antarctic Territory. Scale 1:200000 topographic map. DOS 610 Series, Sheet W 64 62. Directorate of Overseas Surveys, UK, 1980.
- Antarctic Digital Database (ADD). Scale 1:250000 topographic map of Antarctica. Scientific Committee on Antarctic Research (SCAR). Since 1993, regularly upgraded and updated.
