= Madzharovo Point =

Point in the Palmer Archipelago, Antarctica

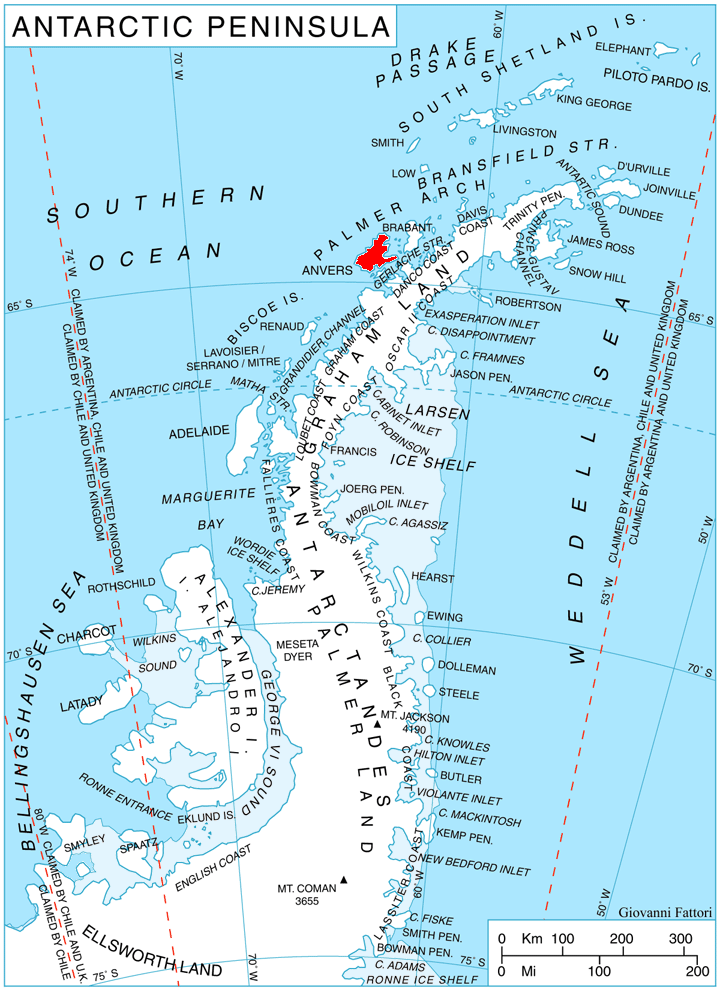
Location of Anvers Island in the Antarctic Peninsula region.

Madzharovo Point (Bulgarian: нос Маджарово, ‘Nos Madzharovo’ \'nos ma-'dzha-ro-vo\) is a point on the southwest coast of Fournier Bay in Anvers Island in the Palmer Archipelago, Antarctica separating the termini of Thamyris Glacier to the northwest and Kleptuza Glacier to the southeast.

The point is named after the town of Madzharovo in southeastern Bulgaria.

== Location ==
Madzharovo Point is located at 64°34′09″S 63°16′46″W, which is 4.94 km southwest of Predel Point and 3.88 km west of Studena Point. British mapping in 1980.

== Maps ==
- British Antarctic Territory. Scale 1:200000 topographic map No. 3217. DOS 610 - W 64 62. Tolworth, UK, 1980.
- Antarctic Digital Database (ADD). Scale 1:250000 topographic map of Antarctica. Scientific Committee on Antarctic Research (SCAR). Since 1993, regularly upgraded and updated.
