= Predel Point =

Point in the Palmer Archipelago, Antarctica

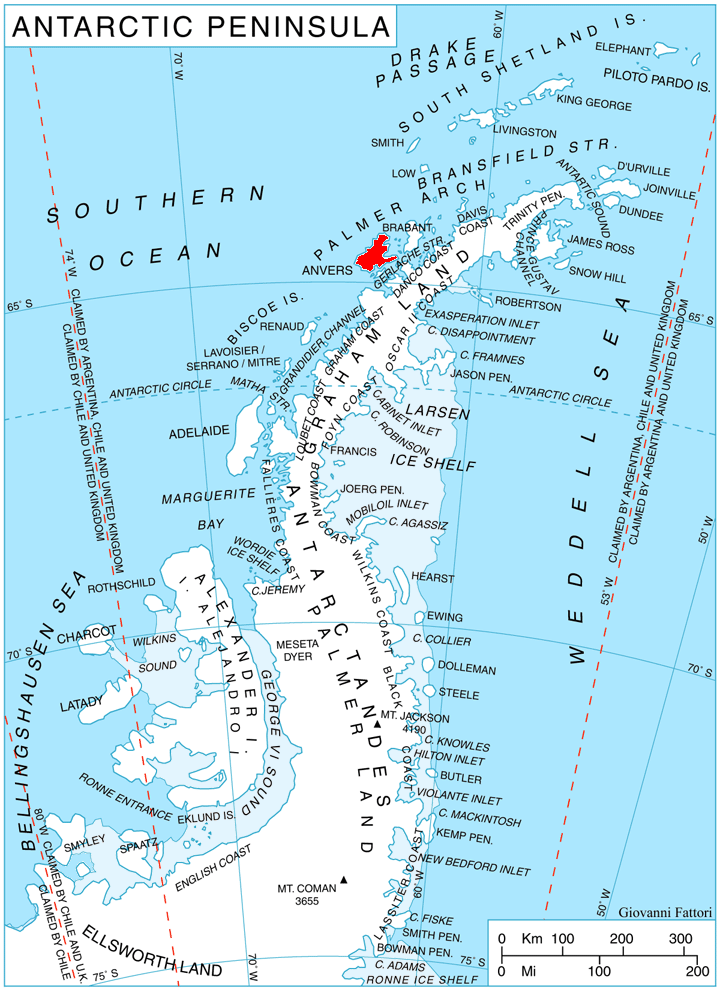
Location of Anvers Island in the Antarctic Peninsula region.

Predel Point (Bulgarian: нос Предел, ‘Nos Predel’ \'nos pre-'del\) is a point on the northwest coast of Fournier Bay in Anvers Island in the Palmer Archipelago, Antarctica separating the termini of Rhesus Glacier to the north and Thamyris Glacier 4 km to the south.

The point is named after Predel Saddle between the mountains of Pirin and Rila in southwestern Bulgaria.

== Location ==
Predel Point is located at 64°32′08″S 63°12′43″W, which is 10.72 km southwest of Dralfa Point, 15.03 km west-southwest of Andrews Point and 3.77 km north by west of Studena Point. British mapping in 1980.

== Maps ==
- British Antarctic Territory. Scale 1:200000 topographic map No. 3217. DOS 610 - W 64 62. Tolworth, UK, 1980.
- Antarctic Digital Database (ADD). Scale 1:250000 topographic map of Antarctica. Scientific Committee on Antarctic Research (SCAR). Since 1993, regularly upgraded and updated.
