= Lapteva Island =

Island in the Palmer Archipelago, Antarctica

- Location within Antarctic Peninsula

Geography
- Location: Antarctica
- Coordinates: 64°14′50″S 63°30′47″W
- Archipelago: Palmer Archipelago

Administration
- Administered under the Antarctic Treaty System

Demographics
- Population: Uninhabited

Lapteva Island (Bulgarian: остров Лаптева, romanized: ostrov Lapteva, IPA: [ˈɔstrof ˈɫaptɛvɐ]) is the island lying 1 km off the north coast of Anvers Island in the Palmer Archipelago, Antarctica. The feature extends 900 m in north–south direction and 880 m in east–west direction.

The island is named after Gergana Lapteva, geologist at St. Kliment Ohridski base in 2006/07 and subsequent seasons.

== Location ==
Lapteva Island is located at 64°14′50″S 63°30′47″W, 10.54 km northeast of Quinton Point, 1.5 km west-southwest of Lajarte Islands, 8.93 km west of Cape Grönland and 3.38 km west by north of Oberbauer Point. British mapping in 1980.

== Maps ==
- British Antarctic Territory. Scale 1:200000 topographic map. DOS 610 Series, Sheet W 64 62. Directorate of Overseas Surveys, UK, 1980.
- Antarctic Digital Database (ADD). Scale 1:250000 topographic map of Antarctica. Scientific Committee on Antarctic Research (SCAR). Since 1993, regularly upgraded and updated.
