= Thamyris Glacier =

Glacier in Antarctica

- Location of Brabant Island in the Antarctic Peninsula region

- Location within Antarctica
- Location: Palmer Archipelago
- Coordinates: 64°34′00″S 63°19′30″W
- Length: 1.6 nmi (3 km; 2 mi)
- Width: 1.5 nmi (3 km; 2 mi)
- Thickness: unknown
- Terminus: Fournier Bay
- Status: unknown

Thamyris Glacier (Bulgarian: ледник Тамирис, romanized: lednik Tamiris, IPA: [ˈlɛdnik tɐˈmiris]) is a 3 km long and 2.8 km wide glacier draining the east slopes of the Trojan Range on Anvers Island in the Palmer Archipelago, Antarctica. Situated east of Iliad Glacier, south of Rhesus Glacier and northwest of Kleptuza Glacier. Flowing northeastwards into Fournier Bay south of Predel Point and north of Madzharovo Point.

The glacier is named after the Thracian singer Thamyris in Homer's Iliad.

== Location ==
Thamyris Glacier is centred at 64°34′00″S 63°19′30″W. British mapping in 1980.

== See also ==
- List of glaciers in the Antarctic
- Glaciology

== Maps ==
- British Antarctic Territory. Scale 1:200000 topographic map No. 3217. DOS 610 - W 64 62. Tolworth, UK, 1980.
- Antarctic Digital Database (ADD). Scale 1:250000 topographic map of Antarctica. Scientific Committee on Antarctic Research (SCAR). Since 1993, regularly upgraded and updated.
