= Holt Inlet =

Holt Inlet (64°22′00″S 63°17′00″W) is a western arm of Lapeyrère Bay on Anvers Island, in the Palmer Archipelago. The inlet is 2 nautical miles (3.7 km) long and 1 nautical mile (1.9 km) wide, with the entrance south of The Hump. Named by the Advisory Committee on Antarctic Names in 2007 after Rennie S. Holt, Director, Antarctic Ecosystem Research Group, Southwest Fisheries Science Center, La Jolla, CA; leader of the U.S. Antarctic Marine Living Resources (AMLR) program to waters adjoining the South Shetland Islands and the northern Antarctic Peninsula, from 1989 to 2006.
