= Pavel Deliradev =

Bulgarian figure (1879–1957)

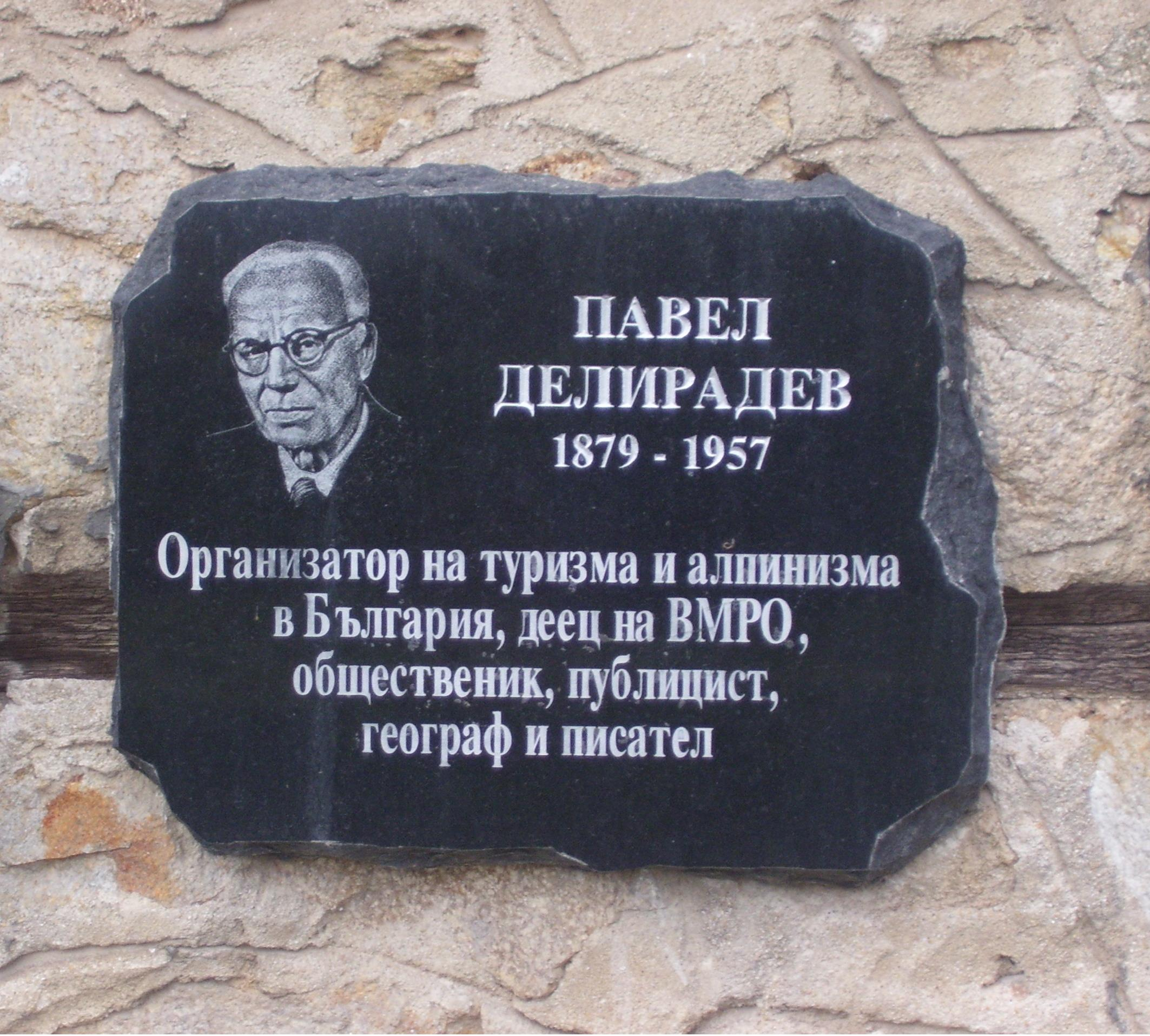
Memorial plaque in Panagyurishte

Pavel Dimitrov Deliradev (Bulgarian: Павел Димитров Делирадев; 15 February 1879 – 9 February 1957) was a Bulgarian revolutionary, writer, researcher, journalist and public figure.

== Early life and education ==
He was born on 15 February 1879 in the town of Panagyurishte, then in Eastern Rumelia. Deliradev graduated from junior high school in his hometown and later a carpentry school in Ruse. He later studied history and geography at Sofia University, but per historian Mercia MacDermott, he was unable to graduate due to political discrimination. In 1894, he became a teacher in the village of Pchelin, Sofia Province. There he became a leftist.

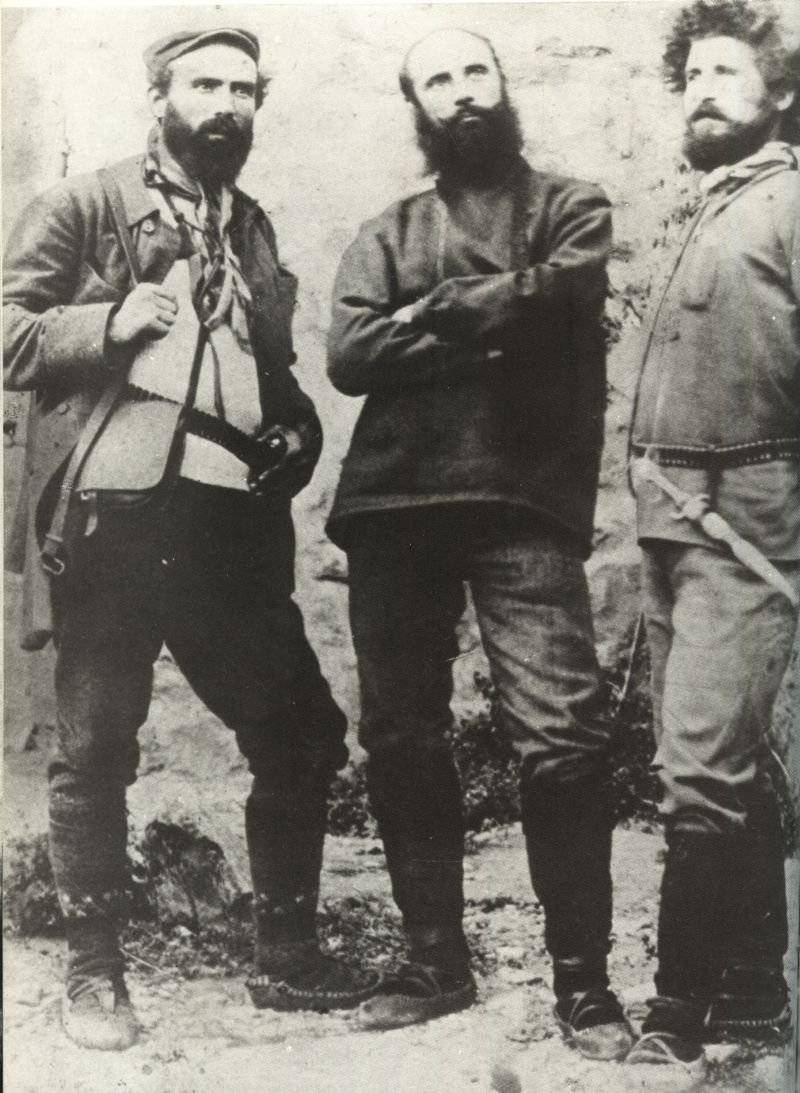
Pavel Deliradev, Yane Sandanski and Todor Panitsa in Bansko, 1908.

== Career ==
He became a member of the Bulgarian Workers' Social Democratic Party in 1897. Deliradev was the founder of the socialist organizations in Panagyurishte and Ruse and of the Bulgarian General Workers' Trade Union, collaborating with Georgi Dimitrov for the latter. From 1907, to 1912 he led an armed detachment of the Internal Macedonian Revolutionary Organization in Ottoman Macedonia and edited the newspapers of the Serres revolutionary district. Along with fellow leftist Dimo Hadzhidimov, he supported Yane Sandanski's decision to contact the Young Turks. After the declaration of the Young Turk Revolution in 1908, Deliradev authored and published the manifesto "To All Nationalities in the Empire", supporting the preservation of the Ottoman Empire. He participated in the creation of the People's Federative Party (Bulgarian Section), drafting its statute and program. Pavel Deliradev and Nikola Harlakov organized Bulgarian social-democratic group in Thessaloniki in 1908 and in 1909 joined the Socialist Workers' Federation there.

== Later life ==
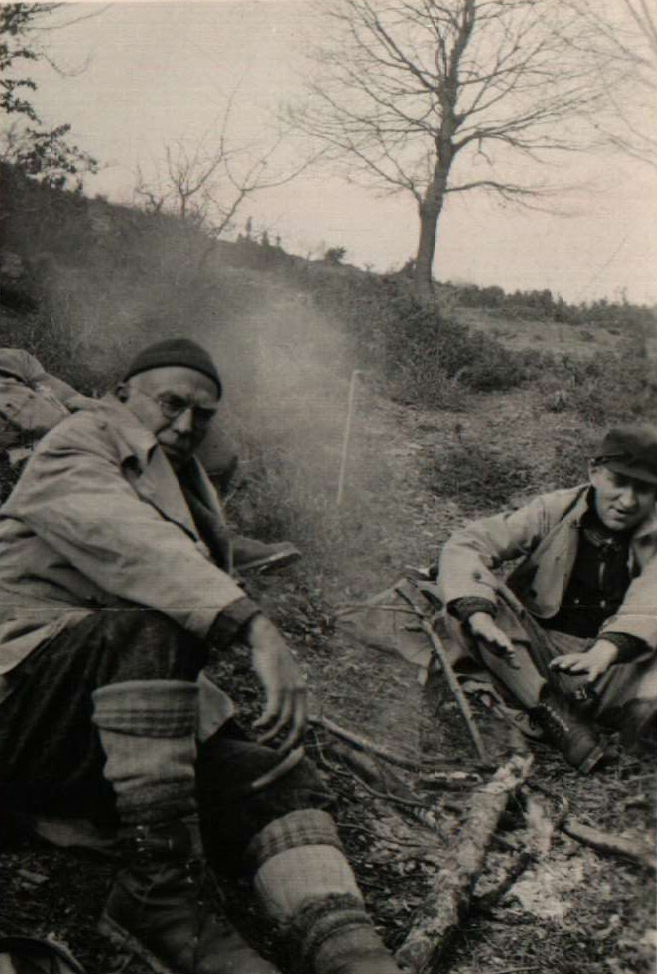
Deliradev on a tourist trip in Bulgarian mountains.

During the Balkan Wars and the First World War he was mobilized in the Bulgarian Army. After Bulgaria's defeat in World War I and the abdication of Tsar Ferdinand on 3 October 1918, his son Boris III ascended the throne. Deliradev, who was still mobilized but was known for his radical anti-monarchist political beliefs, refused to take the obligatory military oath before the new monarch. Because of this act, he was brought to justice. This act marked a turning point in his life, and after the trial Deliradev withdrew from active socio-political life and the revolutionary movement. Instead, he directed all his energy towards scientific research.

After the wars, he was one of the most active organizers of tourism in Bulgaria. He was the founder of mountaineering and caving in Bulgaria. Deliradev made scientific contributions in geography, geology, medicine, biology, etc. He was the author of over 50 books of scientific, popular science and travel literature, socio-political brochures and over 2,500 articles. In 1933, Deliradev and his companion Pavel Tsvyatkov were the first to walk the Kom–Emine route, all the way along the ridge of the Balkan Mountains from peak Kom to cape Emine. They took 30 days to achieve this.

After the 1944 Bulgarian coup d'état, Deliradev was in the leadership of the Macedonian Scientific Institute. He won the Georgi Dimitrov Award in 1950. Deliradev was a member of the Union of Bulgarian Writers.

Deliradev is the author of several popular science books about the Bulgarian mountains, such as "Vitosha" (1926), "Osogovo" (1927), "Rila" (in two volumes, 1928, 1932), "Rhodopi" (1937), etc, as well as of works of a historical and ethnographic nature such as "Contribution to the Historical Geography of Thrace" (in two volumes, 1953).

== Death and legacy ==
He died in Sofia on 9 February 1957.

Deliradev Point forming the south side of the entrance to Galata Cove and the north side of the entrance to Lapeyrère Bay on the northeast coast of Anvers Island in the Palmer Archipelago, Antarctica, is named after him. A hut is named after him. It is located in Sredna Gora near Panagyurski kolonii.

== Views ==
He claimed that neither foreign intervention, nor unification with Bulgaria, would solve the Macedonian question. He believed that the problem could be solved with the democratization of the Ottoman Empire itself, which would be achieved with the union of the progressives. He regarded the activity of IMRO's right wing as "a revival of Vûrkhovizm" and also said that "the official patriots in Bulgaria, Serbia, and Greece have always tried to use [the guerilla movement] for their own purposes". He argued that the slogan Macedonia for the Macedonians was unable to unite people because Macedonia was the subject of struggles between "subordinates and subordinates". In his opinion, autonomy was not a suitable option either, because it expressed the ideals of the Bulgarians and was not acceptable to other national groups.

As an ideologist of IMRO's left wing, he supported federalist principles. His belief was that through those principles, Macedonia would be transformed from the "bones of contention" to the "bones of reconciliation". Deliradev proposed the creation of a Great Eastern Federative Republic, which he believed, would eliminate the national antagonisms of the Balkan peoples.
