= Studena Point =

Point in the Palmer Archipelago, Antarctica

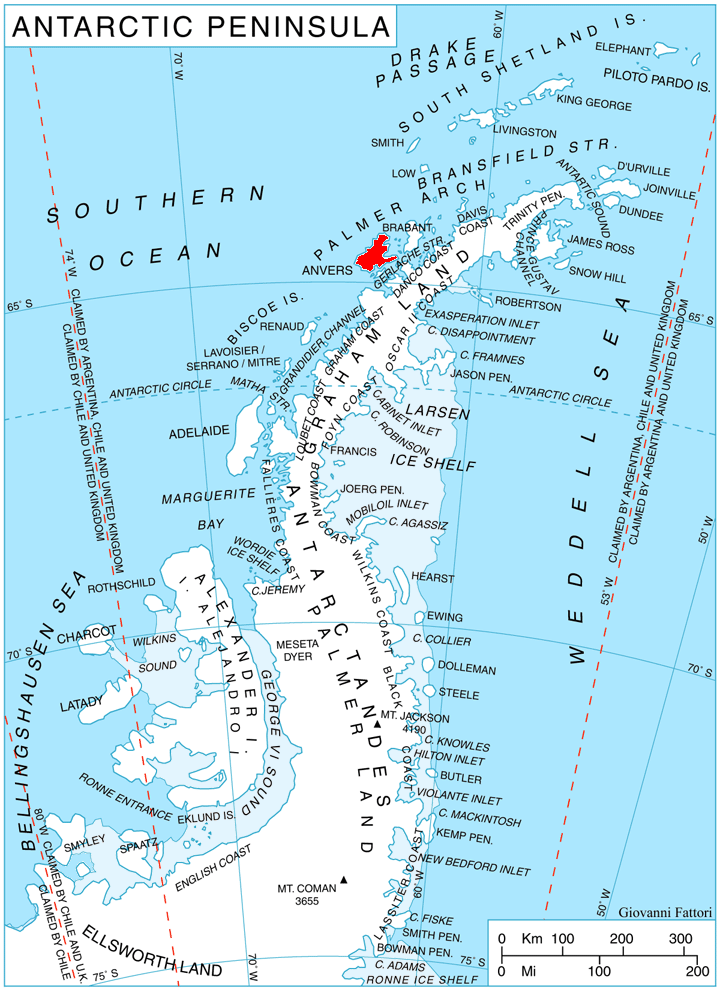
Location of Anvers Island in the Antarctic Peninsula region.

Studena Point (Bulgarian: нос Студена, ‘Nos Studena’ \'nos stu-'de-na\) is a rocky point forming the west side of the entrance to Dalchev Cove on the north coast of Parker Peninsula in the northeast part of Anvers Island, the Palmer Archipelago in Antarctica. It projects 1.4 km northwards into Fournier Bay and separates the termini of Kleptuza Glacier to the west and Altimir Glacier to the east.

The point is named after the settlements of Studena in Western and Southern Bulgaria, and Upper and Lower Studena in northern Bulgaria.

== Location ==
Studena Point is located at 64°34′08″S 63°11′54″W, which is 13.72 km south-southwest of Dralfa Point, 15.55 km southwest of Andrews Point and 3.77 km south by east of Predel Point. British mapping in 1980.

== Maps ==
- British Antarctic Territory. Scale 1:200000 topographic map. DOS 610 Series, Sheet W 64 62. Directorate of Overseas Surveys, UK, 1980.
- Antarctic Digital Database (ADD). Scale 1:250000 topographic map of Antarctica. Scientific Committee on Antarctic Research (SCAR), 1993–2016.
