= Kleptuza Glacier =

Glacier in Antarctica

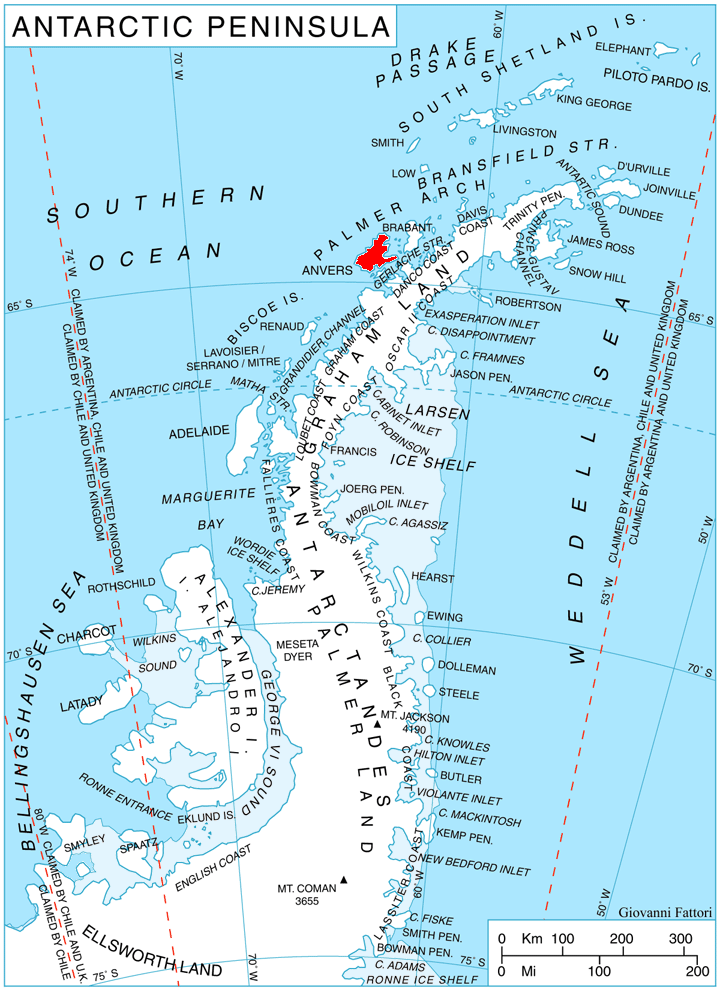
- Location of Anvers Island in the Antarctic Peninsula region

- Location within Antarctica
- Location: Palmer Archipelago
- Coordinates: 64°36′S 62°16′W
- Length: 3 nmi (6 km; 3 mi)
- Width: 3 nmi (6 km; 3 mi)
- Thickness: unknown
- Terminus: Fournier Bay
- Status: unknown

Kleptuza Glacier (Bulgarian: ледник Клептуза, romanized: lednik Kleptuza, IPA: [ˈlɛdnik klɛpˈtuzɐ]) is a 6 km long and 6 km wide glacier draining the east slopes of Mount Hector in the Trojan Range and the north slopes of Osterrieth Range on Anvers Island in the Palmer Archipelago, Antarctica. Situated southeast of Thamyris Glacier and west of Altimir Glacier. Flowing northwards to enter Fournier Bay east of Madzharovo Point and west of Studena Point.

The glacier is named after the karst spring of Kleptuza in southern Bulgaria.

== Location ==
Kleptuza Glacier is located at 64°36′00″S 63°16′00″W. British mapping in 1980.

== See also ==
- List of glaciers in the Antarctic
- Glaciology

== Maps ==
- British Antarctic Territory. Scale 1:200000 topographic map No. 3217. DOS 610 - W 64 62. Tolworth, UK, 1980.
- Antarctic Digital Database (ADD). Scale 1:250000 topographic map of Antarctica. Scientific Committee on Antarctic Research (SCAR). Since 1993, regularly upgraded and updated.
