= Studena =

Studena may refer to places:

== Czech Republic ==
- Studená (Jindřichův Hradec District), a municipality and village in the South Bohemian Region
- Studená (Plzeň-North District), a municipality and village in the Plzeň Region

== Serbia ==
- Studena (Babušnica), a village
- Studena (Vranje), a village
- Studena planina, a mountain

== Other ==
- Studena Point, a place in Antarctica
- Studena, Haskovo Province, a village in Bulgaria
- Studena, Croatia, a village near Klana
- Studena, a village in Cornereva Commune, Caraş-Severin County, Romania
- Studená, Slovakia, a village near Rimavská Sobota, Slovakia
