= Zeus Ridge =

Zeus Ridge (64°35′S 63°34′W) is a heavily crevassed, steep-sided, ice-covered ridge, the main part rising over 1,675 m, extending northwest from Mount Francais between the Achaean and Trojan Ranges in central Anvers Island, in the Palmer Archipelago. Surveyed by the Falkland Islands Dependencies Survey (FIDS) in 1955 and named by the United Kingdom Antarctic Place-Names Committee (UK-APC) for Zeus, the supreme Olympian deity. It was first climbed in 2019 as part of a traverse of the massif.
