= Achaean Range =

Mountain range in Antarctica

Achaean Range in Antarctica

Achaean Range (64°30′S 63°38′W) is a mountain range rising to 2,577 metres (8,455 ft) in the central part of Anvers Island in the Palmer Archipelago. It is bounded on the east by Iliad Glacier and Trojan Range and on the west by Marr Ice Piedmont, and extends northwest from Mount Agamemnon for 10 kilometres (6 mi), curving northeast for a further 19 km (12 mi) to Mount Nestor. Surveyed by the Falkland Islands Dependencies Survey (FIDS) in 1955 and named by the United Kingdom Antarctic Place-Names Committee (UK-APC) for the Achaeans, one of the opposing forces of the Trojan War in Homer's Iliad.

== List of mountains ==
- Mount Achilles (64°29′S 63°35′W) is a snow-covered, steep-sided mountain, 1,343 m (4,406 ft), which rises 6 km (4 mi) southwest of Mount Nestor. Surveyed by the FIDS in 1955 and named by the UK-APC for Achilles, the central figure in Homer's Iliad.
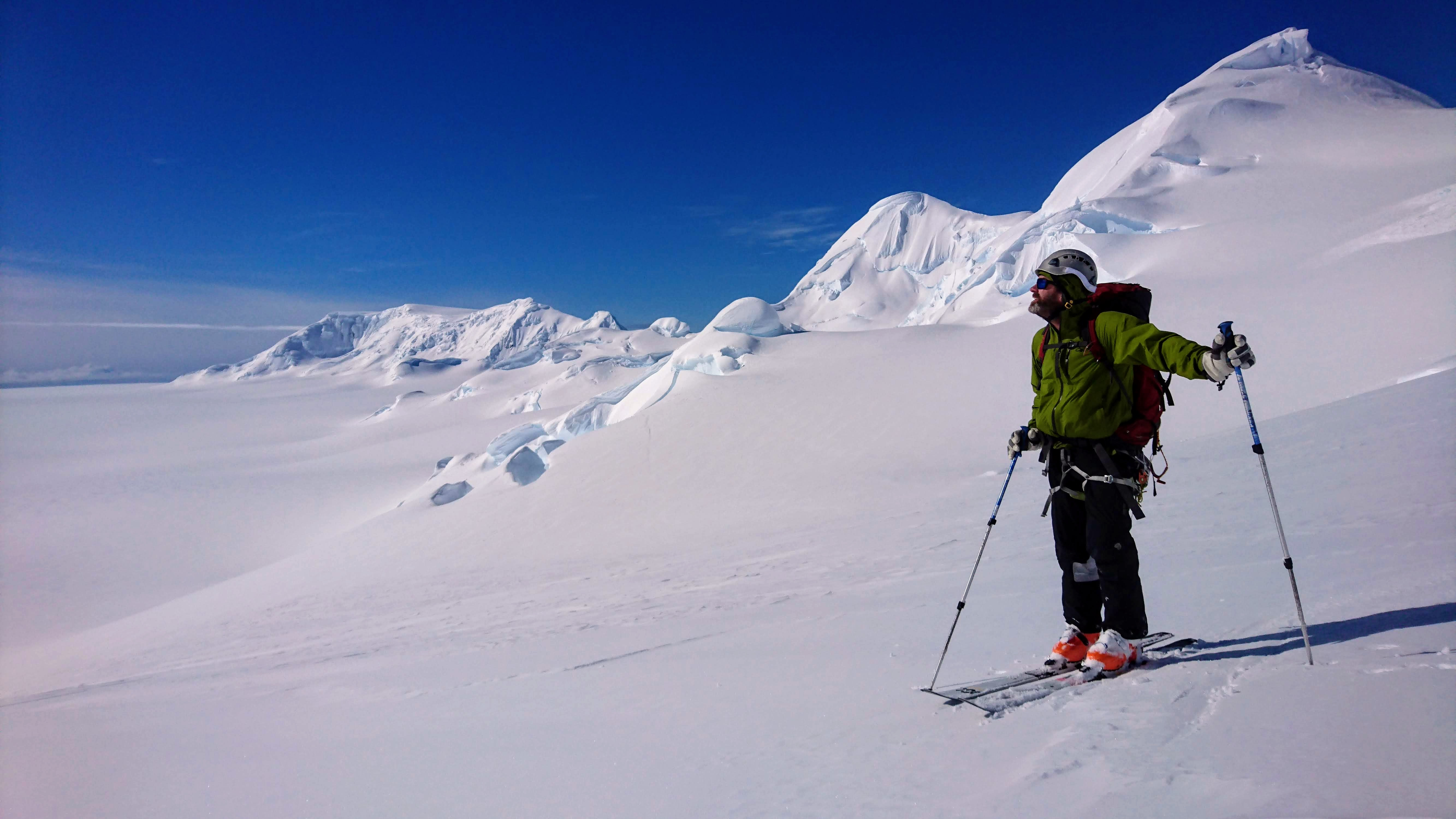
  Skiing down the North face of Mt Achilles after the first ascent
- Mount Agamemnon (64°38′S 63°31′W) is a snow-covered mountain, 2,577 m (8,455 ft), marking the south limit of the Achaean Range. It is part of the Mount Francais massif but has a separate summit 1.5 miles (2.4 km) west of the main peak of Mount Francais. It was surveyed by the FIDS in 1944, and again in 1955. Named by the UK-APC for Agamemnon, Commander in Chief of the Achaean forces at Troy in Homer's Iliad.
- Mount Nestor (64°25′S 63°28′W) is a mountain, 1,302 m (4,272 ft), the northernmost of the Achaean Range. Its western side rises steeply from Marr Ice Piedmont; its eastern side is a jumble of crevasses and jagged rock pinnacles. Surveyed by the FIDS in 1955 and named by the UK-APC for Nestor, oldest of the Achaean chieftains fighting at Troy in Homer's Iliad.

== See also ==
- Achilles Heel
- Patroclus Hill
