= Lajarte Islands =

Island group in Palmer Archipelago, Antarctica

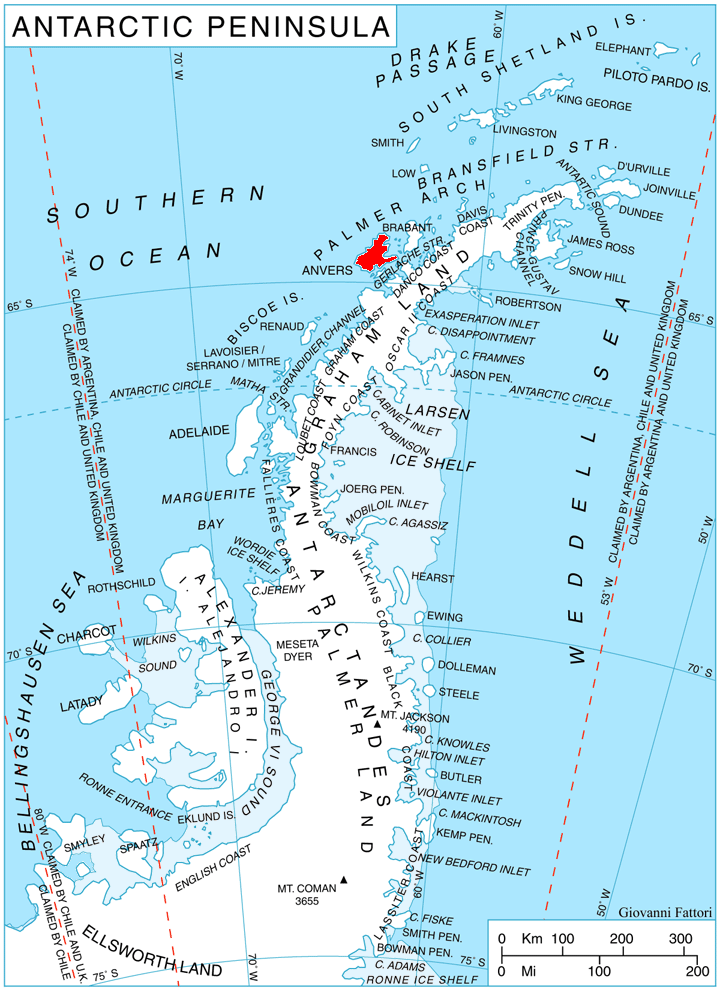
Location of Anvers Island in the Antarctic Peninsula region.

The Lajarte Islands (64°14′S 63°24′W) are a group of islands fringing the north coast of Anvers Island, close west of Cape Grönland and 1.5 km east-northeast of Lapteva Island, in the Palmer Archipelago, Antarctica.

The islands were discovered by a German expedition under Eduard Dallmann, 1873–74. They were charted by the French Antarctic Expedition, 1903–05, and named by Jean-Baptiste Charcot for Captain Dufaure de Lajarte of the French Navy.

== See also ==
- List of Antarctic and sub-Antarctic islands
