= Dalchev Cove =

Cove in the Palmer Archipelago, Antarctica

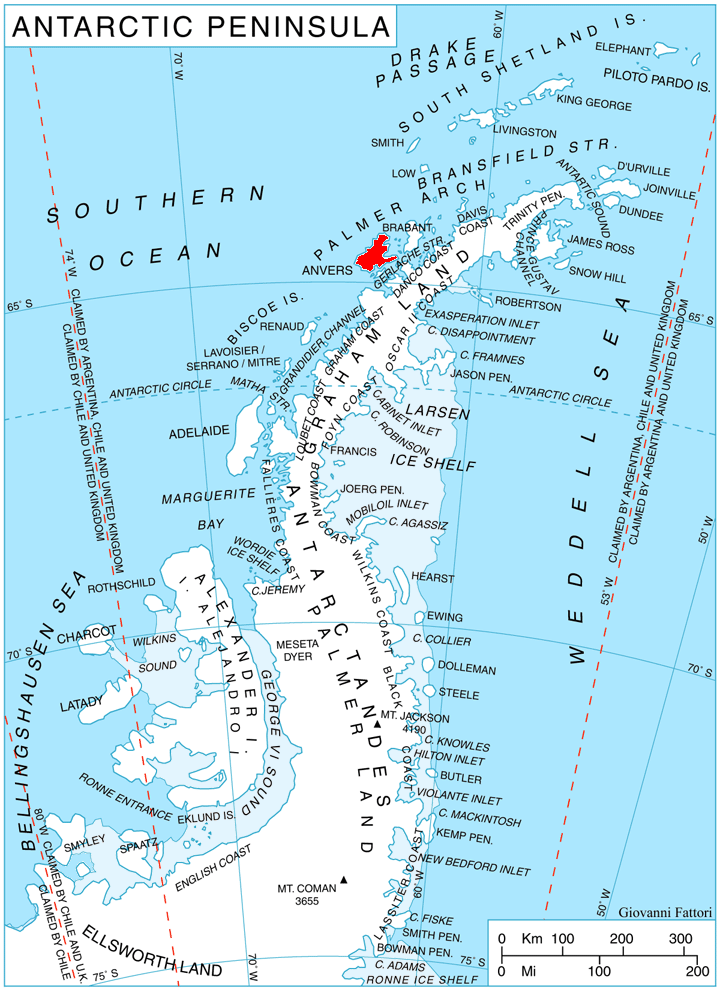
Location of Anvers Island in the Antarctic Peninsula region.

Dalchev Cove (Bulgarian: Далчев залив, ‘Dalchev Zaliv’ \'dal-chev 'za-liv\) is the 3.72 km wide cove indenting for 2.45 km the northwest coast of Parker Peninsula on the northeast coast Anvers Island in the Palmer Archipelago, Antarctica. It is the part of Fournier Bay entered east of Studena Point, having its head fed by Altimir Glacier.

The cove is named after the Bulgarian sculptor Lyubomir Dalchev (1902–2002).

== Location ==
Dalchev Cove is centred at 64°34′20″S 63°09′20″W. British mapping in 1980.

== Maps ==
- British Antarctic Territory. Scale 1:200000 topographic map. DOS 610 Series, Sheet W 64 62. Directorate of Overseas Surveys, UK, 1980.
- Antarctic Digital Database (ADD). Scale 1:250000 topographic map of Antarctica. Scientific Committee on Antarctic Research (SCAR). Since 1993, regularly upgraded and updated.
