= Frolosh Point =

Point in the Palmer Archipelago, Antarctica

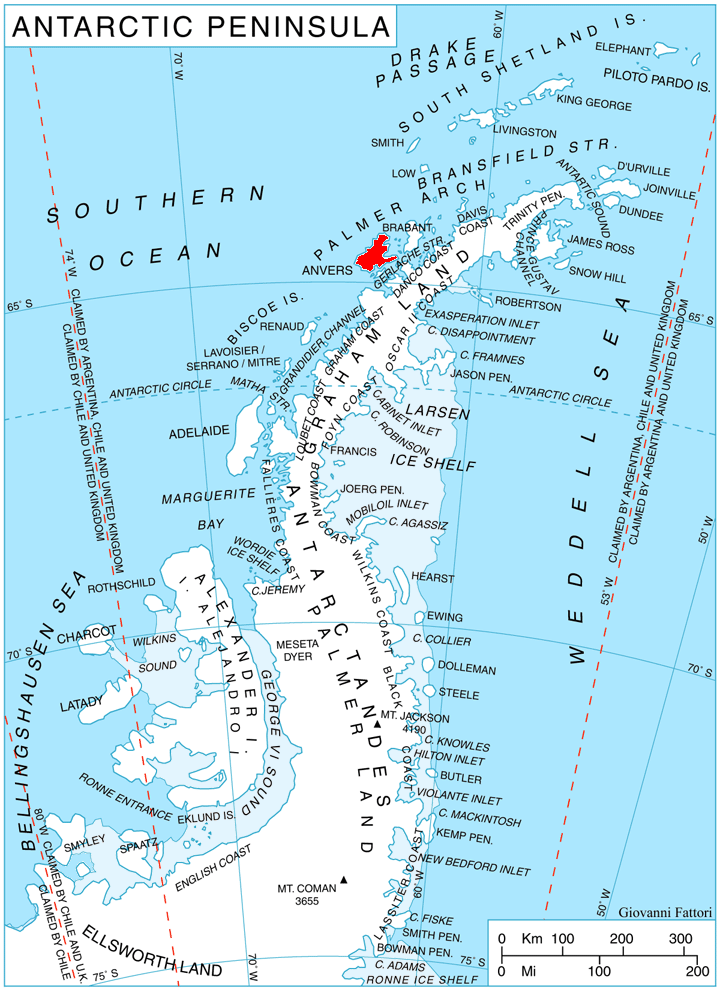
Location of Anvers Island in the Antarctic Peninsula region.

Frolosh Point (Bulgarian: нос Фролош, ‘Nos Frolosh’ \'nos 'fro-losh\) is the point forming the north side of the entrance to Galata Cove on the northeast coast of Anvers Island in the Palmer Archipelago, Antarctica.

The point is named after the settlement of Frolosh in western Bulgaria.

== Location ==
Frolosh Point is located at 64°18′45″S 63°09′10″W, which is 1.93 km north of Deliradev Point, 4.1 km south-southeast of Cape Bayle and 7 km west of Lambda Island in the Melchior Islands. British mapping in 1980.

== Maps ==
- British Antarctic Territory. Scale 1:200000 topographic map. DOS 610 Series, Sheet W 64 62. Directorate of Overseas Surveys, UK, 1980.
- Antarctic Digital Database (ADD). Scale 1:250000 topographic map of Antarctica. Scientific Committee on Antarctic Research (SCAR). Since 1993, regularly upgraded and updated.
