= Patagonia Bay =

Bay in Antarctica

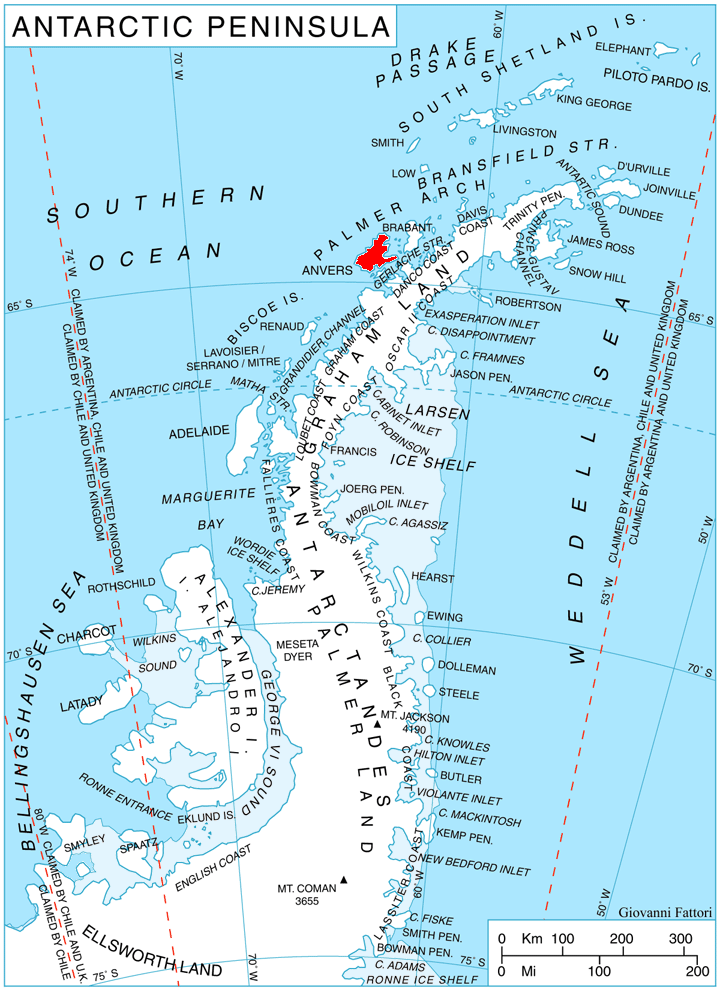
Location of Anvers Island in the Antarctic Peninsula region.

Patagonia Bay (64°27′S 63°12′W) is a bay between Gourdon Peninsula and Thompson Peninsula on the northeast coast of Anvers Island, Palmer Archipelago in Antarctica. It is entered north of Dralfa Point. The bay's head is fed by Lipen Glacier.

Named "Bahia Patagonia" by the Argentine Antarctic Expedition, 1947, after the expedition ship Patagonia.
