= Oberbauer Point =

Headland of the Palmer Archipelago

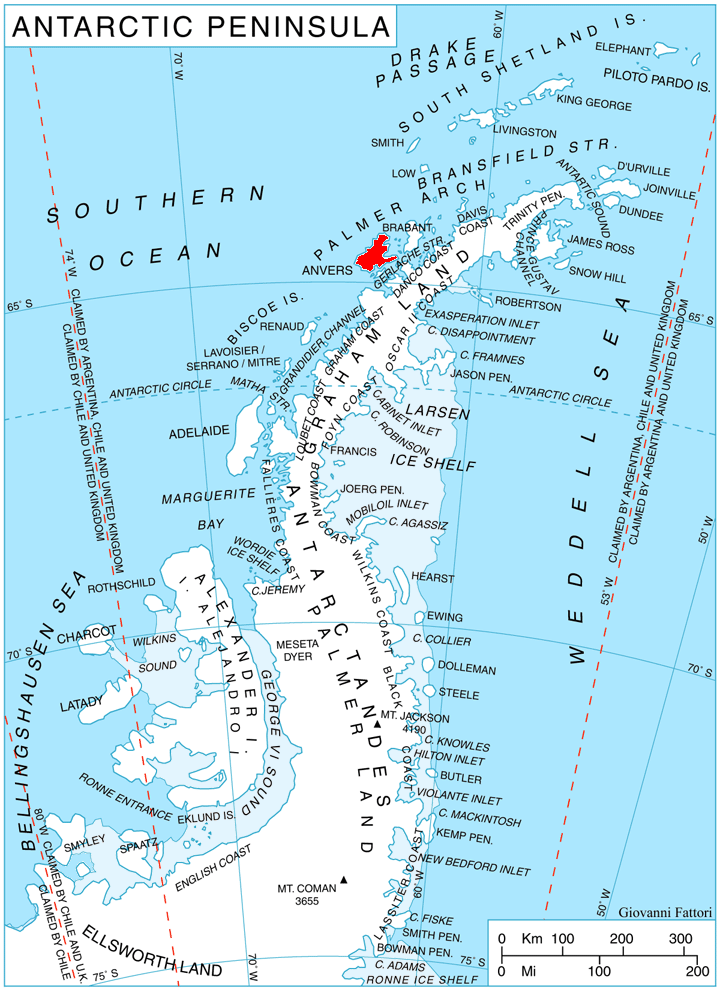
Location of Anvers Island in the Antarctic Peninsula region.

Oberbauer Point (Bulgarian: нос Обербауер, ‘Nos Oberbauer’ \'nos 'o-ber-ba-u-er\) is the point on the west side of the entrance to Gerritsz Bay on the north coast of Anvers Island in the Palmer Archipelago, Antarctica.

The point is named after the Austrian Bulgarian artist Joseph Oberbauer (1853-1926).

== Location ==
Oberbauer Point is located at 64°15′02″S 63°26′09″W, which is 5.67 km west of Cape Grönland and 13.52 km northeast of Quinton Point. British mapping in 1980.

== Maps ==
- British Antarctic Territory. Scale 1:200000 topographic map. DOS 610 Series, Sheet W 64 62. Directorate of Overseas Surveys, UK, 1980.
- Antarctic Digital Database (ADD). Scale 1:250000 topographic map of Antarctica. Scientific Committee on Antarctic Research (SCAR). Since 1993, regularly upgraded and updated.
