= Gerritsz Bay =

Bay in Antarctica

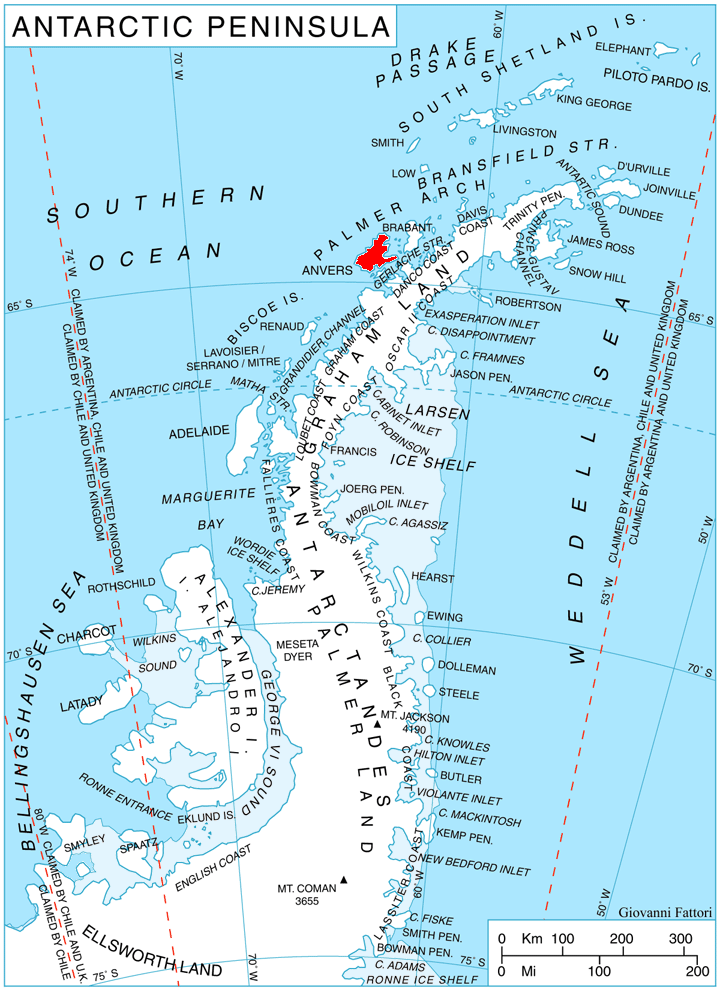
Location of Anvers Island in the Antarctic Peninsula region.

Gerritsz Bay (Bulgarian: залив Гериц, romanized: zaliv Gerits, IPA: [ˈzaliv ˈɡɛrit͡s]) is the 4 km wide bay indenting for 2.15 km the north coast of Anvers Island in the Palmer Archipelago, Antarctica. It is entered east of Oberbauer Point and west of the northwest extremity of the small peninsula forming Cape Grönland.

The point is so named in order to preserve the historical memory of the area. Having navigated the Strait of Magellan in 1599, the Dutch mariner Dirck Gerritsz Pomp (1544-1608) was blown to the south and reportedly sighted an extensive, ice-covered mountainous land. Although Gerritsz was unlikely to have reached 60° south latitude, some later publications used the name Gerritsz Archipelago for the Palmer Archipelago or Gerritsz Islands for the South Shetlands.

== Location ==
Gerritsz Bay is centred at 64°15′20″S 63°23′00″W. British mapping in 1980.

== Maps ==
- British Antarctic Territory. Scale 1:200000 topographic map. DOS 610 Series, Sheet W 64 62. Directorate of Overseas Surveys, UK, 1980.
- Antarctic Digital Database (ADD). Scale 1:250000 topographic map of Antarctica. Scientific Committee on Antarctic Research (SCAR). Since 1993, regularly upgraded and updated.
