= Pear Island =

Pear Island (64°31′S 62°54′W) is a small island lying immediately southwest of False Island, off the northeast coast of Anvers Island in the Palmer Archipelago, off the Antarctic Peninsula.

The existence of the island is noted on a British hydrographic chart of 1929; the name appears on a British hydrographic chart of 1952.

== See also ==
- List of Antarctic and sub-Antarctic islands
