= Mount Hector =

Mount Hector can refer to:

- Mount Hector (Antarctica) in Antarctica
- Mount Hector (Alberta) in Alberta, Canada
- Mount Hector (New Zealand) in the southern North Island
