= Achilles Heel =

Achilles Heel may refer to:

- Achilles' heel, a narrative from Greek mythology that is used as a metaphor for a fatal weakness in spite of overall strength
- Achilles Heel (album), music by Pedro the Lion
- Achilles Heel (hill), off Antarctica
- "Achilles Heel", a single by Toploader, originally released in 1999 and re-released in 2000
- "Achilles Heel", a song by Janani K. Jha from the 2024 album The Rest of the Laurels
- "Achilles Heel" (Homeland), an episode of the TV series Homeland

== See also ==
- Achilles tendon
