= Patroclus Hill =

Patroclus Hill (64°28′S 63°37′W) is a rounded, snow-covered hill, 760 m, separated by a low col from the northwest side of Mount Achilles in the Achaean Range of Anvers Island, in the Palmer Archipelago. Surveyed by the Falkland Islands Dependencies Survey (FIDS) in 1955 and named by the United Kingdom Antarctic Place-Names Committee (UK-APC) for Patroclus, the squire and close friend of Achilles in Homer's Iliad.
