= Lion Island, Palmer Archipelago =

Island in Antarctica

Lion Island
- Location of Lion Island

- Location within Antarctic Peninsula Location within Antarctica

Geography
- Location: Antarctica
- Coordinates: 64°41′S 63°8′W
- Archipelago: Palmer Archipelago
- Length: 2.8 km (1.74 mi)
- Width: 1.9 km (1.18 mi)

Administration
- Administered under the Antarctic Treaty System

Demographics
- Population: 0

Lion Island is an island 1.5 nautical miles (2.8 km) long and 1 nautical mile (1.9 km) wide, lying off the east side of Anvers Island and 1 nautical mile (1.9 km) northeast of Cape Astrup, Wiencke Island, in the Palmer Archipelago off the Antarctic Peninsula.

It was discovered by the Belgian Antarctic Expedition, 1897–1899, under Adrien de Gerlache. The name appears on a map based on a 1927 survey by Discovery Investigations personnel on the RRS Discovery. The profile of the island suggests a reclining lion when viewed from the southwest.

== See also ==
- Félicie Point
- Gerlache Strait Geology
- Hippolyte Point
- List of Antarctic and sub-Antarctic islands
