= Dralfa Point =

Headland on Anvers Island, Palmer Archipelago, Antarctica

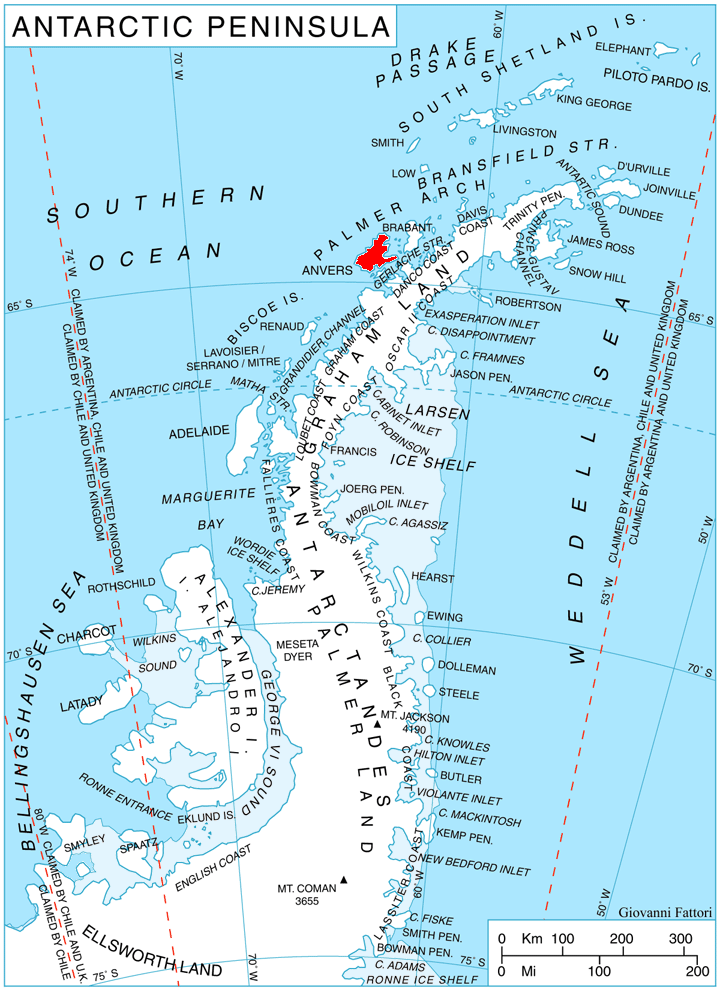
Location of Anvers Island in the Antarctic Peninsula region.

Dralfa Point (Bulgarian: нос Дралфа, ‘Nos Dralfa’ \'nos 'dral-fa\) is the point on the south side of the entrance to Patagonia Bay and the north side of the entrance to Fournier Bay, forming the north extremity of Thompson Peninsula on the northeast coast of Anvers Island in the Palmer Archipelago, Antarctica, 26 km south-southeast of Cape Grönland, 7.07 km south by east of Gourdon Point and 18.6 km northwest of Ryswyck Point.

The point is named after the settlement of Dralfa in northeastern Bulgaria.

== Location ==
Dralfa Point is at 64°27′18″S 63°05′23″W. British mapping in 1980.

== Maps ==
- British Antarctic Territory. Scale 1:200000 topographic map. DOS 610 Series, Sheet W 64 62. Directorate of Overseas Surveys, UK, 1980.
- Antarctic Digital Database (ADD). Scale 1:250000 topographic map of Antarctica. Scientific Committee on Antarctic Research (SCAR), 1993–2016.
