= Inverleith Harbour =

Bay in Antarctica

Coordinates: 64°32′S 63°0′W

Inverleith Harbour is a small bay between Andrews Point and Briggs Peninsula along the northeast coast of Anvers Island, in the Palmer Archipelago, Antarctica. It was presumably discovered by whalers working in this area who gave the name "Inverleith" or "Leith Harbour". "Inverleith Harbour" ("inver" meaning the place of meeting of rivers or where a river falls into the sea or lake) is recommended because the name "Leith Harbour" is used elsewhere in the Antarctic. Leith, Scotland, is the home of Salvesen and Company, a whaling firm which has operated extensively in Antarctic waters.

== See also ==
- Gerlache Strait Geology
- Anvers Island Geology
