= The Hump (Antarctica) =

The Hump (64°21′00″S 063°15′00″W) is a conspicuous dome-shaped summit on the northern shore of Lapeyrère Bay, northern Anvers Island, in the Palmer Archipelago. The name appears on a chart based on a 1927 survey by Discovery Investigations personnel on the RRS Discovery, but may reflect an earlier naming.

The Hump is mentioned in the sailing records of USS Bear, which sighted it on March 9, 1941, during the ship's journey to evacuate members of the United States Antarctic Service Expedition.
