= Félicie Point =

Félicie Point (64°42′S 63°9′W) is a point which forms the south end of Lion Island, lying immediately east of Anvers Island in the Palmer Archipelago. It was charted and named by the Belgian Antarctic Expedition, 1897–99, under Gerlache.
