= Galata Cove =

Cove in the Palmer Archipelago, Antarctica

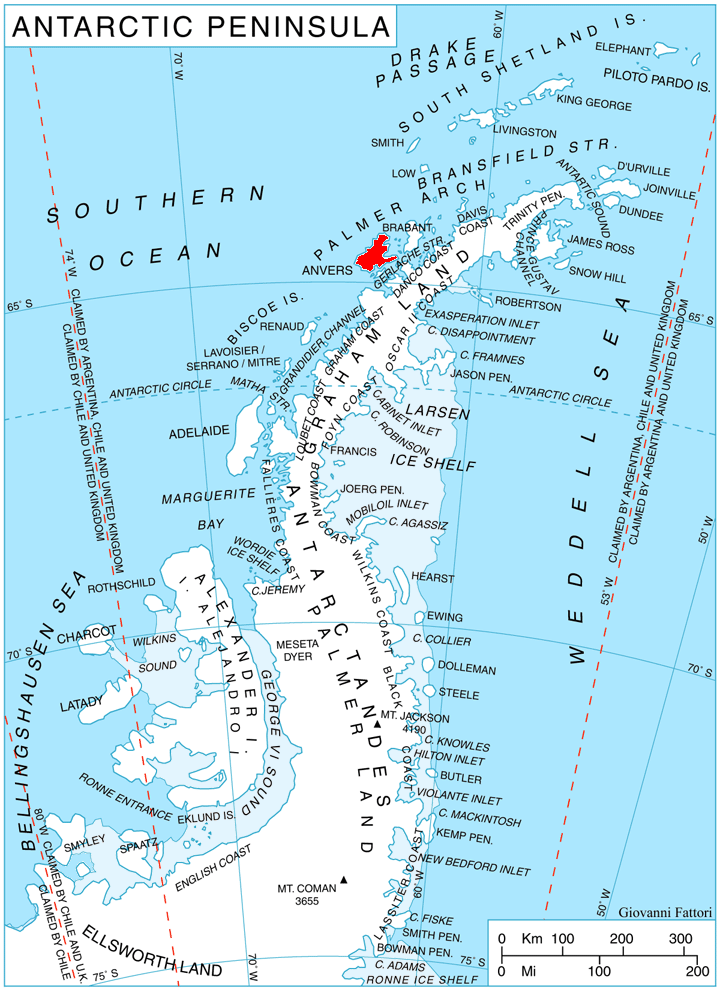
Location of Anvers Island in the Antarctic Peninsula region.

Galata Cove (Bulgarian: залив Галата, romanized: zaliv Galata, IPA: [ˈzaliv ˈɡaɫɐtɐ]) is the 1.93 km wide cove indenting for 2.18 km the northeast coast of Anvers Island in the Palmer Archipelago, Antarctica. It is entered south of Frolosh Point and north of Deliradev Point.

The cove is named after the Galata Point on the Bulgarian Black Sea coast.

== Location ==
Galata Cove is centred at 64°19′00″S 63°10′50″W. British mapping in 1980.

== Maps ==
- British Antarctic Territory. Scale 1:200000 topographic map. DOS 610 Series, Sheet W 64 62. Directorate of Overseas Surveys, UK, 1980
- Antarctic Digital Database (ADD). Scale 1:250000 topographic map of Antarctica. Scientific Committee on Antarctic Research (SCAR). Since 1993, regularly upgraded and updated.
