= Briggs Peninsula =

The Briggs Peninsula (64°31′S 63°1′W) is a small peninsula forming the west side of Inverleith Harbour on the northeast coast of Anvers Island, in the Palmer Archipelago. The northeast point of the peninsula was charted in 1927 by DI personnel on the RSS Discovery, who named it Briggs Point for Able Seaman A.C. Briggs, a member of the survey party. As air photos show no distinct point in this location, the name was applied to the entire peninsula by the UK Antarctic Place-Names Committee in 1959.

== See also ==
- Gerlache Strait Geology
- Anvers Island Geology
