= Marr Ice Piedmont =

Marr Ice Piedmont (64°33′S 63°40′W) is a large ice piedmont which covers the northwestern half of Anvers Island, in the Palmer Archipelago, Antarctica. This feature was presumably first seen by a German expedition under Eduard Dallmann, 1873–74, and was first roughly surveyed by the French Antarctic Expedition, 1903–05, and French Antarctic Expedition, 1908–10, both under Jean-Baptiste Charcot. It was named by the UK Antarctic Place-Names Committee for British marine biologist James W.S. Marr, first commander of the Falkland Islands Dependencies Survey, 1943–45, and leader of the base at nearby Port Lockroy. Marr was also a member of the British Australian New Zealand Antarctic Research Expedition under Mawson, 1929–31, and of Shackleton's expedition of 1921–22.
