= Hippolyte Point =

Hippolyte Point (64°41′S 63°7′W) is a point which marks the northeast end of Lion Island, lying immediately east of Anvers Island in the Palmer Archipelago, Antarctica. It was charted and named by the Belgian Antarctic Expedition under Gerlache, 1897–99.
