= Altimir Glacier =

Glacier in Antarctica

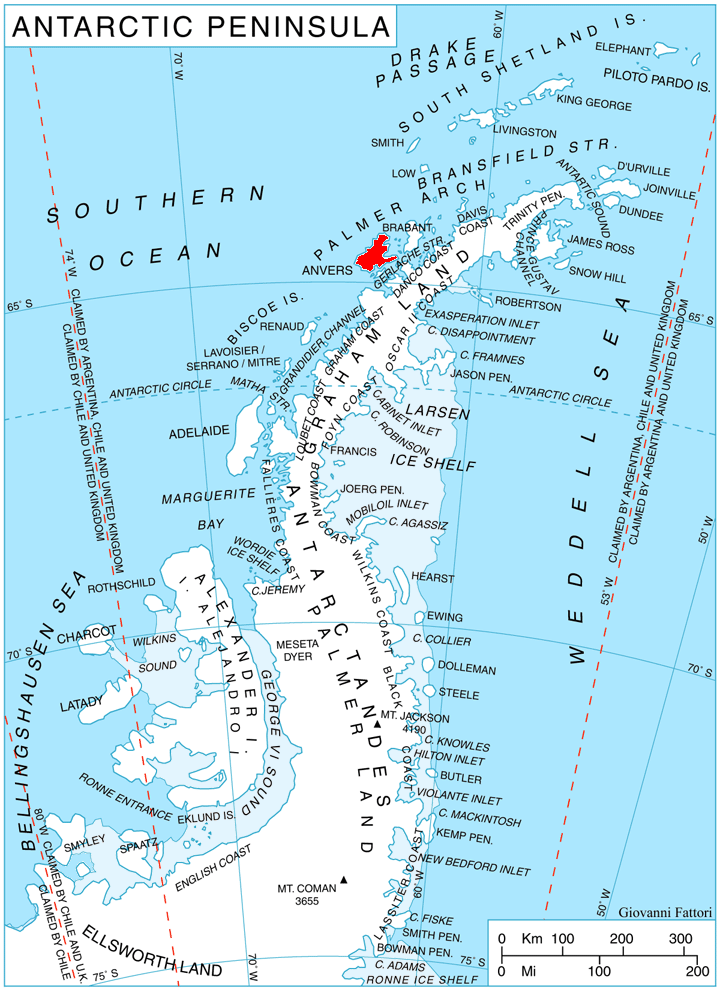
- Location of Anvers Island in the Antarctic Peninsula region

- Location within Antarctica
- Location: Anvers Island
- Coordinates: 64°35′50″S 63°09′00″W
- Length: 4.8 km (3.0 mi)
- Width: 5.5 km (3.4 mi)
- Terminus: Fournier Bay

Altimir Glacier (Bulgarian: ледник Алтимир, romanized: lednik Altimir, IPA: [ˈlɛdnik ɐɫtiˈmir]) is a 4.8-kilometre (3.0 mi) long and 5.5-kilometre (3.4 mi) wide glacier draining the north slopes of the Osterrieth Range on Anvers Island in the Palmer Archipelago, Antarctica. It flows northwards to enter Dalchev Cove in Fournier Bay east of Studena Point.

The glacier is named after the settlement of Altimir in northwestern Bulgaria.

== Location ==
Altimir Glacier is located at 64°35′50″S 63°09′00″W. It was mapped by the British Directorate of Overseas Surveys in 1980.

== See also ==
- List of glaciers in the Antarctic
- Glaciology

== Maps ==
- British Antarctic Territory. Scale 1:200000 topographic map No. 3217. DOS 610 - W 64 62. Tolworth, UK, 1980.
- Antarctic Digital Database (ADD). Scale 1:250000 topographic map of Antarctica. Scientific Committee on Antarctic Research (SCAR), 1993–2016.
