= Lion Sound =

Passage in Antarctica

Lion Sound (64°40′S 63°9′W) is a small passage between Lion Island and the southeast coast of Anvers Island, in the Palmer Archipelago, Antarctica. It was discovered by the Belgian Antarctic Expedition, 1897–99, under Gerlache. The name appears on a map based on a 1927 survey by Discovery Investigations personnel on the Discovery, the sound being named for its association with Lion Island.
