= Thompson Peninsula =

Peninsula in Antarctica

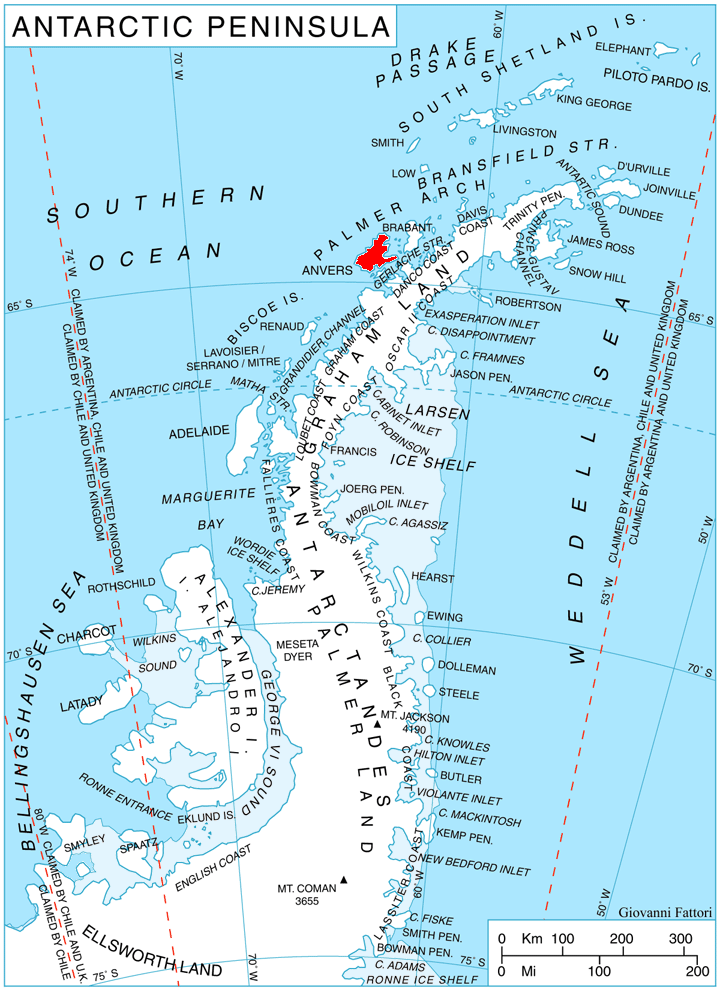
Location of Anvers Island in the Antarctic Peninsula region.

Thompson Peninsula (64°28′S 63°8′W) is a peninsula 3 nautical miles (6 km) long on the northeast coast of Anvers Island in the Palmer Archipelago, Antarctica. It is bounded by Patagonia Bay on the northwest and Fournier Bay on the southeast, and ends in Dralfa Point on the northeast.

The peninsula was surveyed by the Falkland Islands Dependencies Survey (FIDS) in 1955–57, and named by the United Kingdom Antarctic Place-Names Committee (UK-APC) for John W. Thompson (1928–2012) of FIDS, general assistant and mountaineer at Arthur Harbor in 1956 and leader at that station in 1957.
