= Achilles Heel (hill) =

Achilles Heel (64°30′S 63°38′W) is a snow-covered hill, 915 metres (3,000 ft) high, in the center of the col between Mount Helen and Mount Achilles in the Achaean Range of Anvers Island, in the Palmer Archipelago. Surveyed by the Falkland Islands Dependencies Survey (FIDS) in 1955 and so named by the United Kingdom Antarctic Place-Names Committee (UK-APC) due to its position in relation to Mount Achilles.
