= False Island =

False Island (64°31′S 62°53′W) is the largest of three islands lying at the east side of Hackapike Bay, off the northeast coast of Anvers Island, in the Palmer Archipelago. Two islands were charted in this approximate position by the French Antarctic Expedition, 1903–05, under Jean-Baptiste Charcot. False Island was named by Discovery Investigations personnel on the Discovery in 1927.

== Other False Islands ==
There are two islands in Western Australia each named False Island. One is near Onslow in the north-west of the state. The other is near Albany off the south coast.

== See also ==
- List of Antarctic and sub-Antarctic islands
