= Ernest François Fournier =

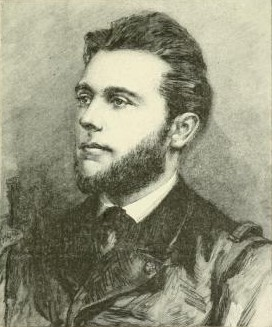
- Born: May 23, 1842; Toulouse, France
- Died: November 6, 1934 (aged 92); Paris, France
- Military career
- Allegiance: France
- Branch: (France) French Navy
- Service years: 1859–1907
- Conflicts: Franco-Prussian War
- Awards: Legion of Honour (1905); Médaille militaire (1907)

Ernest François Fournier (23 May 1842 – 6 November 1934) was a French diplomat and admiral born in Toulouse. He was a negotiator in the Tientsin Accord, which resolved the undeclared war between France and China in 1884.

He joined the navy in 1859, and fought in the Franco-Prussian War, seeing action in Battle of Villiers and Fort Rosny. He was also in charge of the French Mediterranean Sea naval squadron from 1898 until 1900.
