= Andrews Point =

Andrews Point (64°30′S 62°55′W) is a headland between Hackapike Bay and Inverleith Harbour on the northeast coast of Anvers Island, in the Palmer Archipelago. It was charted and named in 1927 by DI personnel on the RRS Discovery.

== See also ==
- Gerlache Strait Geology
- Anvers Island Geology
