= Cape Bayle =

Cape in the Palmer Archipelago, Antarctica

Coordinates: 64°17′S 63°10′W

Cape Bayle is a cape forming the northeast end of Anvers Island, in the Palmer Archipelago. Charted by the French Antarctic Expedition, 1903–1905, under Charcot and named after Vice Admiral Charles-Jesse Bayle (1842–1918), French Navy.
