= Hackapike Bay =

Bay in Antarctica

Coordinates: 64°31′S 62°55′W

Hackapike Bay is an anchorage 4 miles (6 km) northwest of Ryswyck Point, entered west of False Island along the northeast coast of Anvers Island, in the Palmer Archipelago, Antarctica. It was charted and named by the British Graham Land Expedition, 1934–37, under John Rymill.

== See also ==
- Gerlache Strait Geology
- Anvers Island Geology
