= Gourdon Peninsula =

Peninsula in Palmer Archipelago, Antarctica

Gourdon Peninsula (64°24′S 63°12′W) is a snow-covered peninsula 6 nautical miles (11 km) long, forming the southeast side of Lapeyrere Bay on the northeast coast of Anvers Island, in the Palmer Archipelago, Antarctica. The northeast coast of Anvers Island was roughly surveyed by the French Antarctic Expedition under Jean-Baptiste Charcot in 1905 and the name "Pointe Gourdon," for Vice-Admiral Gourdon of the French Navy, was given to a point between Lapeyrere Bay and Fournier Bay. The UK Antarctic Place-Names Committee in 1956 altered the name to Gourdon Peninsula and applied it to the peninsula described, which almost certainly is the feature Charcot had in mind when he gave the original name.

== See also ==
- Gerlache Strait Geology
- Anvers Island Geology
