= Iliad Glacier =

Glacier in Antarctica

- Location within Antarctica
- Location: Palmer Archipelago
- Coordinates: 64°27′S 63°27′W
- Thickness: unknown
- Terminus: Lapeyrère Bay
- Status: unknown

Iliad Glacier (64°27′S 63°27′W) is a glacier flowing northeast from the central highlands of Anvers Island between the Achaean Range and the Trojan Range into Lapeyrere Bay, in the Palmer Archipelago, Antarctica. It was surveyed in 1955 by the Falkland Islands Dependencies Survey and named by the UK Antarctic Place-Names Committee for Homer's Iliad.

== See also ==
- List of glaciers in the Antarctic
- Glaciology
