= Mount Français =

Mountain on Anvers Island, Antarctica

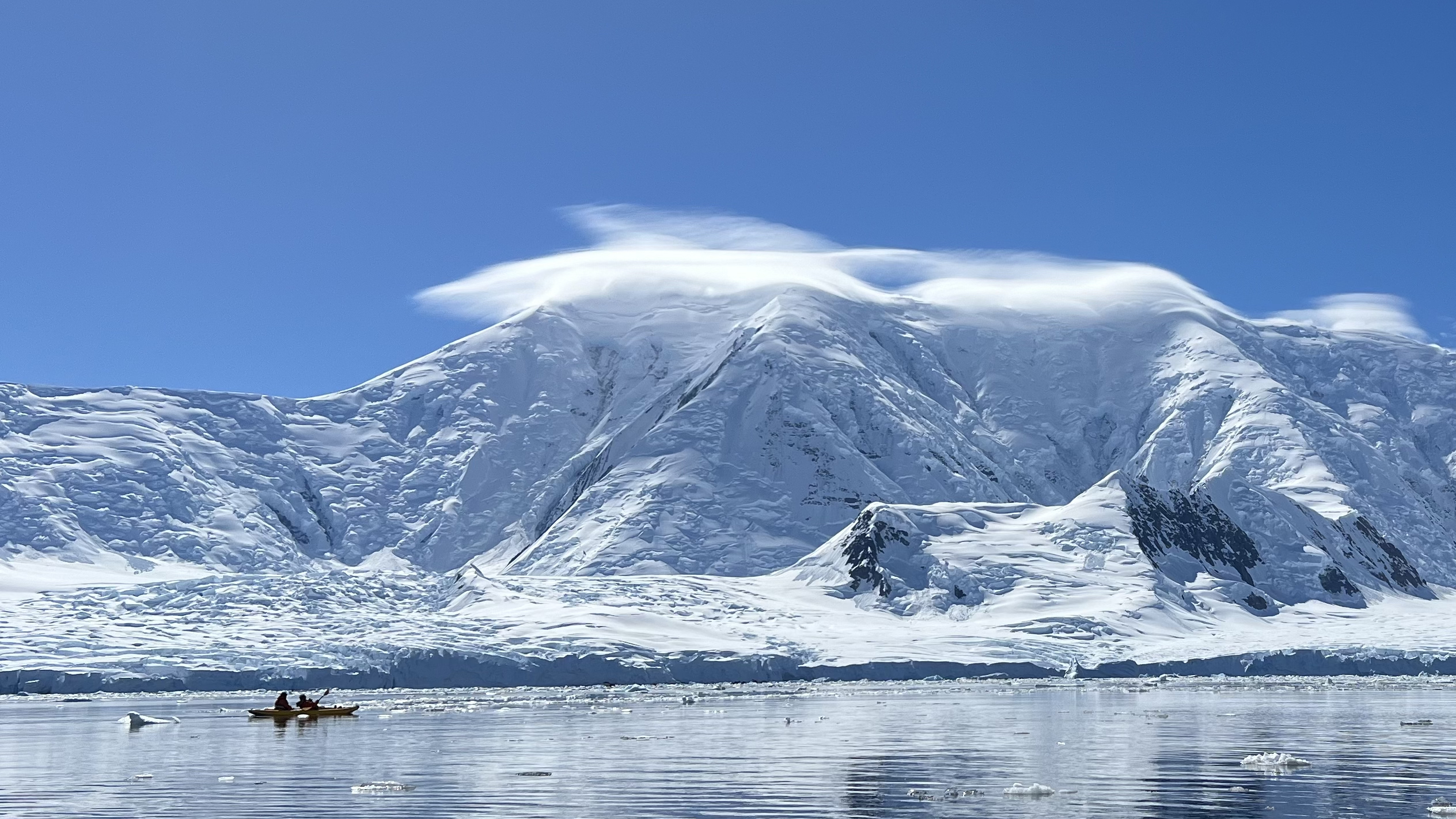
- Mount Français

Highest point
- Elevation: 2,825 m (9,268 ft)
- Prominence: 2,825 m (9,268 ft)
- Listing: Ultra, Ribu
- Coordinates: 64°38′S 63°27′W

Geography
- Location within Antarctica
- Location: Anvers Island, Antarctica
- Parent range: Trojan Range

Mount Français is a mountain which forms the summit of Anvers Island, Antarctica, in the Antarctic claims of the United Kingdom, Argentina and Chile. It stands southeast of the center of the island and 6 miles north of Borgen Bay. Mount Français has an elevation of 2,825 metres (9,268 ft) and is part of the Trojan mountain range.

== History ==
Mount Français was first seen by the members of the Belgian Antarctic Expedition, who explored the southeast coast of the island in 1898. It was later sighted by the French Antarctic Expedition team members, 1903–05, under Charcot, who named it for the expedition ship Français.

Mount Français was first summited on 7 December 1955 by Jim Rennie, Arthur Shewry, and Bill Hindson, members of the Falkland Islands Dependencies Survey who had spent the 1955 winter at Base E, newly constructed north of Arthur Harbor on Anvers Island.

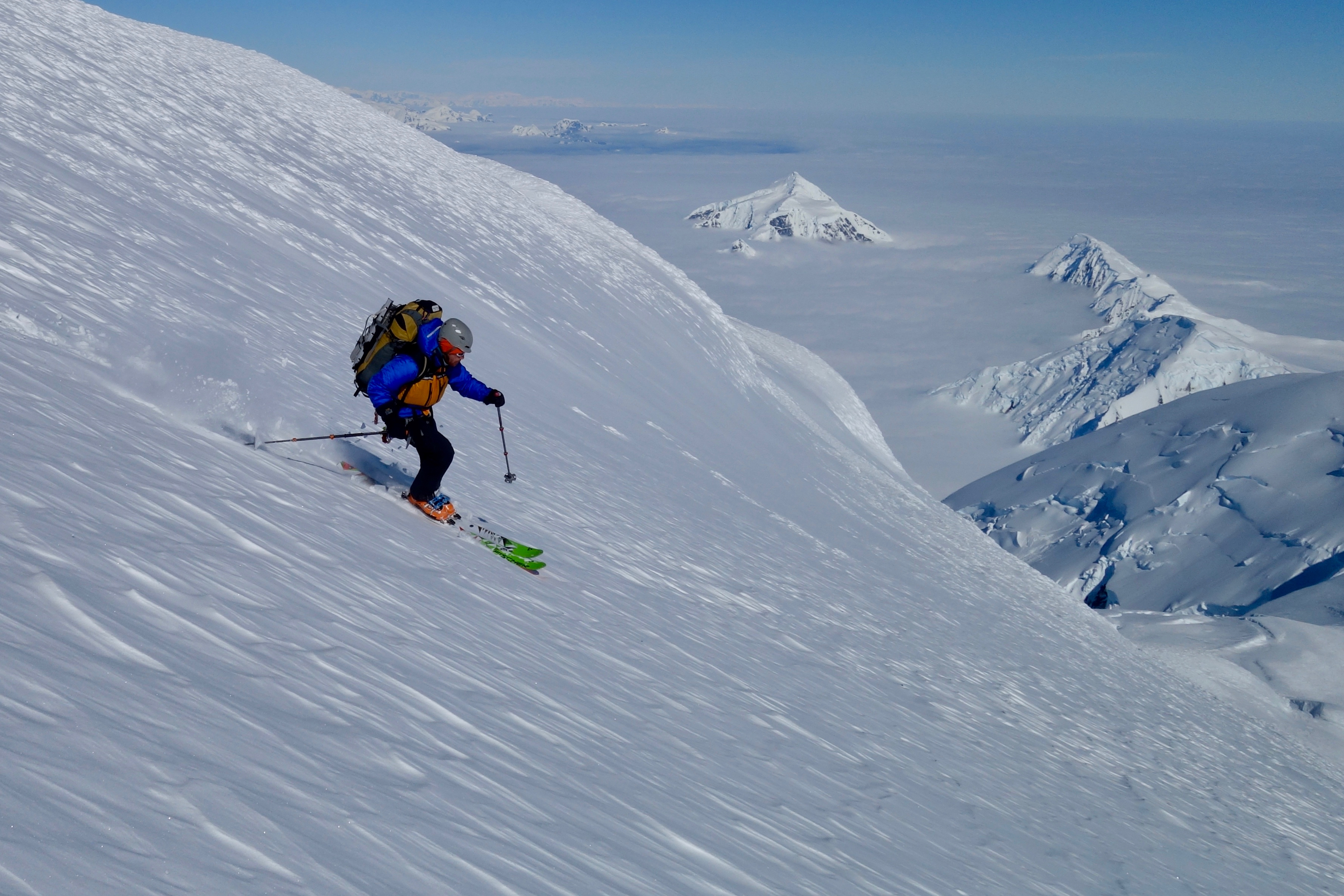
A mountaineer skis down Mt Francais during the first traverse of the mountain.

== See also ==
- List of Ultras of Antarctica
- List of islands by highest point
