= Fournier Bay =

Bay in Antarctica

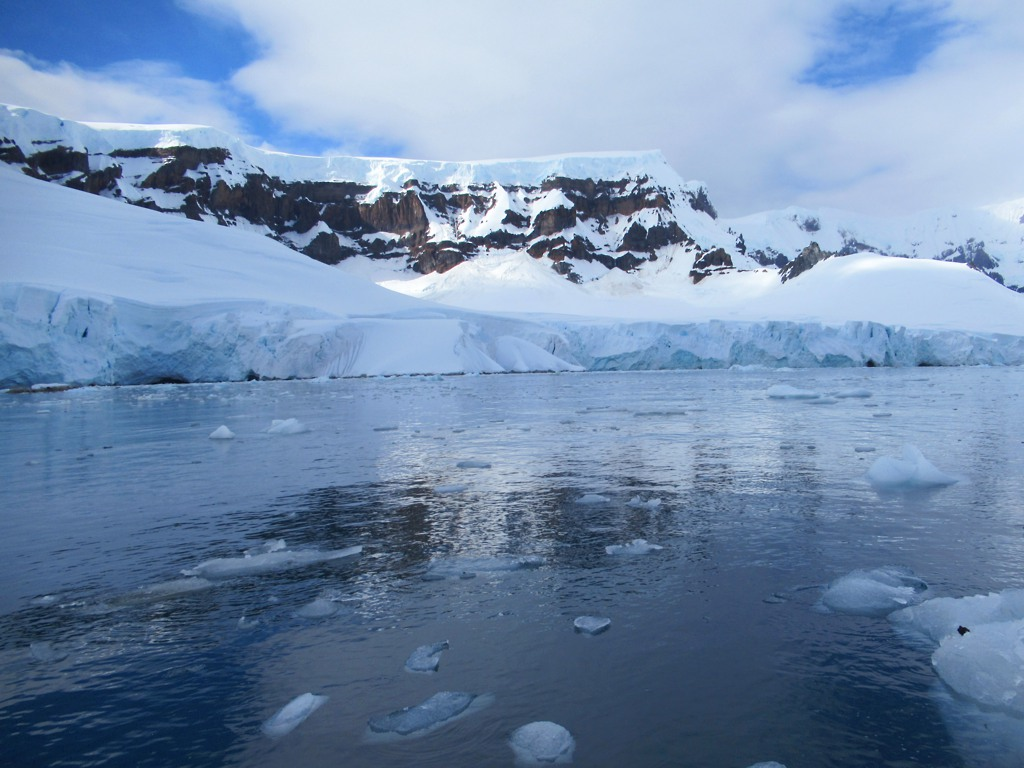

- Location of Anvers Island in the Antarctic Peninsula region
- Location: Palmer Archipelago, Antarctica
- Coordinates: 64°31′S 63°06′W
- Type: Bay
- Etymology: Ernest François Fournier
- Part of: Palmer Archipelago
- Primary inflows: Rhesus Glacier, Thamyris Glacier, Kleptuza Glacier, Altimir Glacier
- Ocean/sea sources: Southern Ocean
- Max. length: 8 nautical miles (15 km)
- Max. width: 3 nautical miles (6 km)
- Islands: Anvers Island

Fournier Bay is a bay 8 nautical miles (15 km) long and 3 nautical miles (6 km) wide, indenting the northeast coast of Anvers Island immediately west of Briggs Peninsula and south of Dralfa Point, in the Palmer Archipelago, Antarctica. Its head is fed by Rhesus, Thamyris, Kleptuza and Altimir Glaciers.

The bay was probably first seen by a German expedition, 1873–74, under Eduard Dallmann. It was charted by the French Antarctic Expedition, 1903–05, under Jean-Baptiste Charcot, and named by him for Vice Admiral Ernest François Fournier of the French Navy.

== See also ==
- Gerlache Strait Geology
- Anvers Island Geology
