= Lapeyrère Bay =

Bay in Antarctica

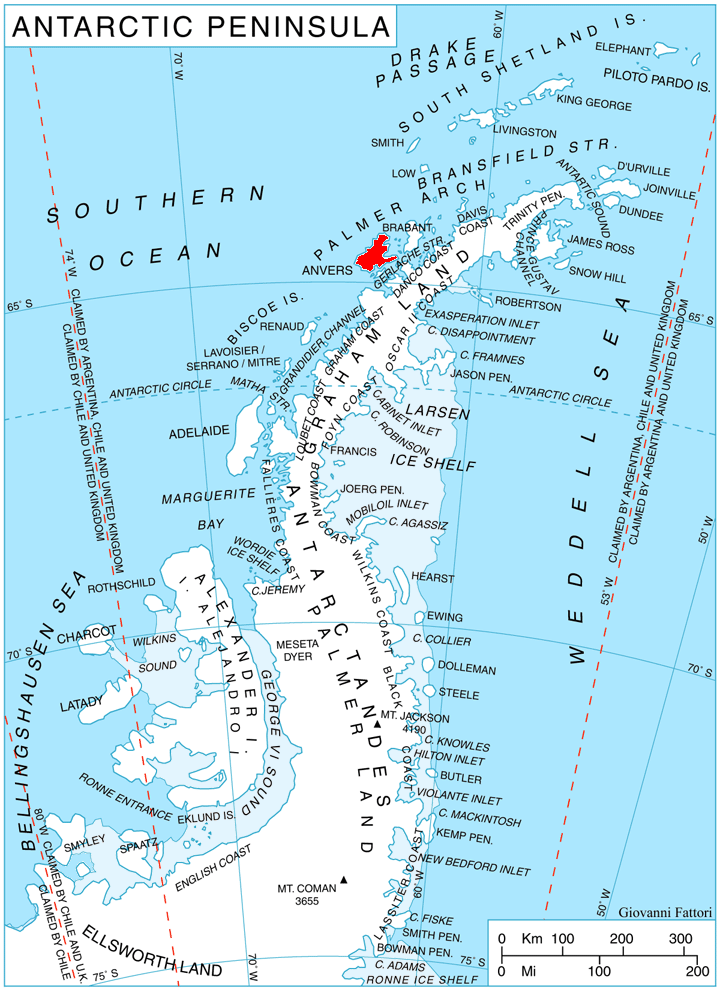
Location of Anvers Island in the Antarctic Peninsula region.

Lapeyrère Bay (64°23′S 63°15′W) is 7 nautical miles (13 km) long and 2 nautical miles (4 km) wide, and lies north of Gourdon Peninsula, indenting the northeast coast of Anvers Island, in the Palmer Archipelago, Antarctica. Its head is fed by Iliad Glacier.

The bay was roughly charted by the German expedition under Eduard Dallmann, 1873–74. It was recharted by the French Antarctic Expedition, 1903–05, and named by Jean-Baptiste Charcot for Rear Admiral Boué de Lapeyrère of the French Navy.

== See also ==
- Gerlache Strait Geology
- Anvers Island Geology
