= Cape Grönland =

Cape in the Palmer Archipelago, Antarctica

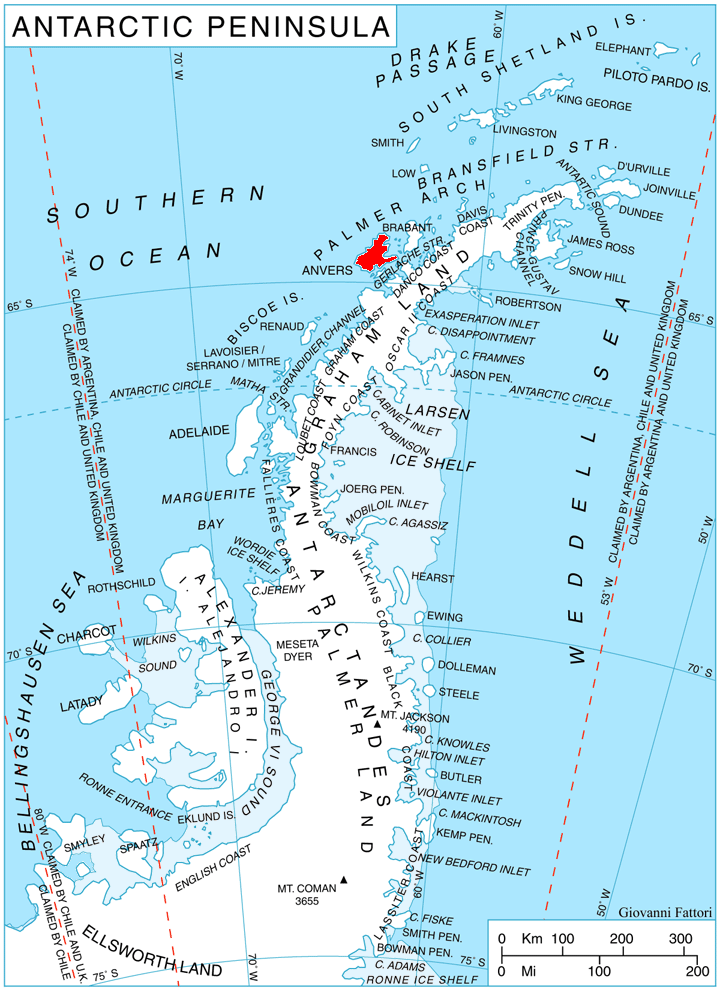
Location of Anvers Island in the Antarctic Peninsula region.

Cape Grönland (64°15′S 63°19′W) is a cape on the east side of the entrance to Gerritsz Bay which forms the northern extremity of Anvers Island, in the Palmer Archipelago, Antarctica.

The cape was discovered by a German expedition 1873–74, under Eduard Dallmann, who named it for his expedition ship, the Grönland. It was later charted by the French Antarctic Expedition, 1903–05, under Jean-Baptiste Charcot.
