= Trojan Range =

Mountain range in Antarctica

Trojan Range in Western Antarctica

The Trojan Range (64°32′S 63°23′W) is a mountain range rising to 2,760 metres (9,055 ft), extending northward from Mount Francais along the east side of Iliad Glacier, Anvers Island, in the Palmer Archipelago of the British Antarctic Territory. It was surveyed by the Falkland Islands Dependencies Survey (FIDS) in 1955 and named by the UK Antarctic Place-Names Committee (UK-APC) for the Trojans, one of the opposing sides in the Trojan War in Homer's Iliad.

== List of geographical features ==
=== Mountains ===
- Mount Français (64°38′S 63°27′W) is a majestic, snow-covered mountain of 2,760 m, which forms the summit of Anvers Island, standing southeast of the center of the island and 6 miles north of Borgen Bay. It was first seen by the Belgian Antarctic Expedition, who explored the southeast coast of the island in 1898 and later sighted by the French Antarctic Expedition, 1903–05, under Jean-Baptiste Charcot, who named it for the expedition ship Francais.
- Mount Hector (64°36′S 63°25′W) is a snow-covered mountain, 2,225 metres, between Mount Francais and Mount Priam in the southern part of the Trojan Range. Surveyed by the FIDS in 1955. Named by the UK-APC for Hector, son of Priam and Commander in Chief of the Trojan and allied armies against the Achaeans in Homer's Iliad.
- Mount Priam (64°34′S 63°24′W) is the central mass of the Trojan Range, standing 4 miles north of Mount Francais. It is flat-topped and snow-covered and rises to 1,980 m. Surveyed in 1955 by the Falkland Islands Dependencies Survey (FIDS), it was named by the UK Antarctic Place-Names Committee (UK-APC) for Priam, King of Troy in Homer's Iliad. Xanthus Spur is a mainly ice-covered spur extending northwestward from Mount Priam for three miles. It was named for Xanthus, son of Zeus and the god of one of the two chief rivers of the Trojan plain.

=== Other features ===
- Bull Ridge (64°41′S 63°28′W) is a ridge lying south of Mount Francais, from which it is separated by a distinct col. It was surveyed by FIDS in 1955–57 and named by UK-APC for George J. Bull, diesel mechanic at Signy Island station in 1955 and general assistant and mountaineer at Arthur Harbour in 1956, who took part in the survey.
