= Anvers Island =

High, mountainous island 61 km (38 miles) long, outside Antarctica

Anvers
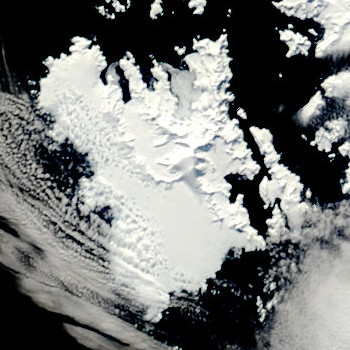
- NASA image of Anvers Island

- Location in Antarctica

Geography
- Location: Antarctica
- Coordinates: 64°33′S 63°35′W
- Archipelago: Palmer Archipelago
- Area: 2,432 km^{2} (939 sq mi)
- Length: 61 km (37.9 mi)
- Highest elevation: 2,760 m (9060 ft)
- Highest point: Mount Français

Administration
- Administered under the Antarctic Treaty System

Demographics
- Population: ~50

Anvers Island, Antwerp Island, Antwerpen Island, or Isla Amberes is a high, mountainous island 61 km (38 miles) long, the largest in the Palmer Archipelago of Antarctica. It was discovered by John Biscoe in 1832 and named in 1898 by the Belgian Antarctic Expedition under Adrien de Gerlache after the province of Antwerp in Belgium. It lies south-west of Brabant Island at the south-western end of the group. The south-western coastline of the island forms part of the Southwest Anvers Island and Palmer Basin Antarctic Specially Managed Area (ASMA 7). Cormorant Island, an Important Bird Area, lies 1 km off the south coast.

There is a small science outpost called Palmer Station on the south end of Anvers island since the late 1960s; it is the smallest and farthest north of three the U.S. has on the continent. It is staffed by a few dozen people mostly doing marine and biology research, and is usually resupplied by ship as it has no regular airport.

== Palmer Station ==
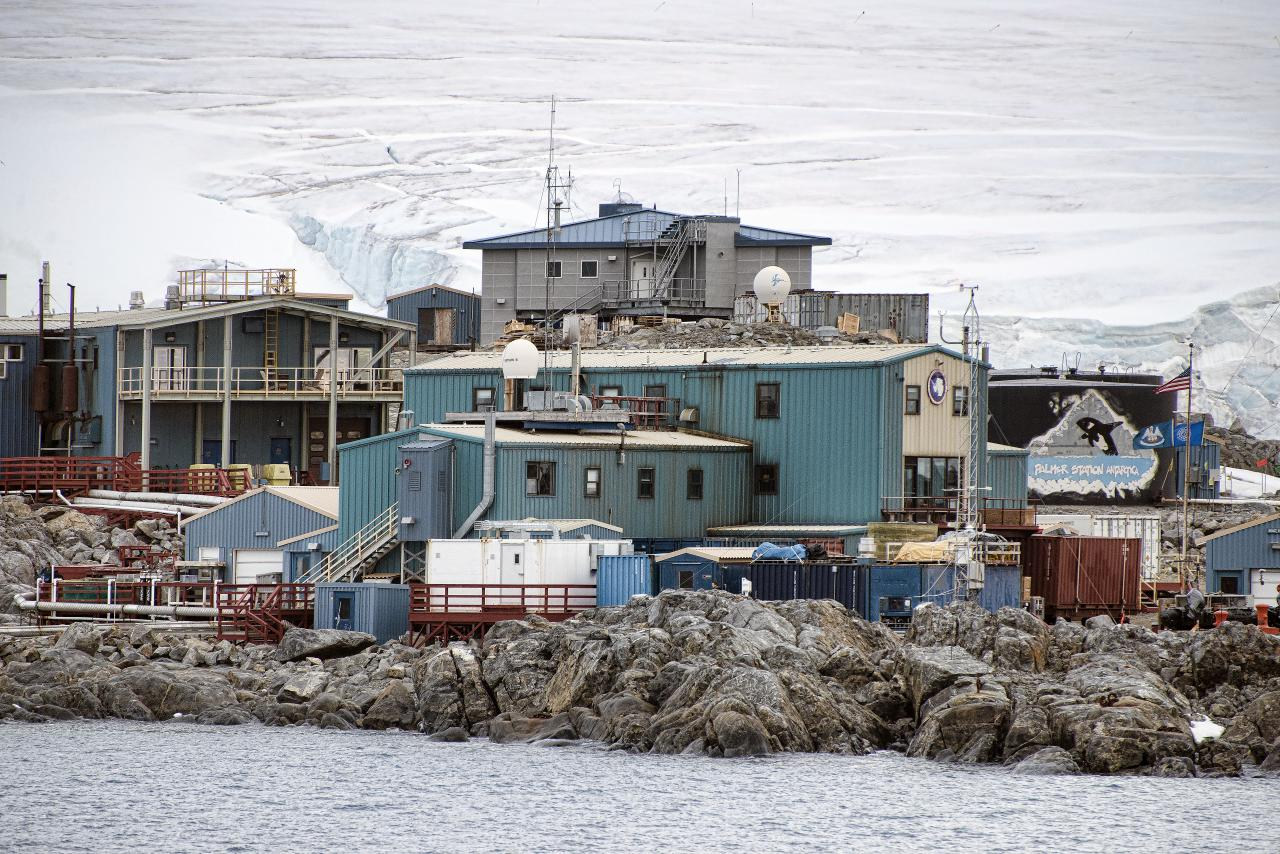
Palmer Station

The Palmer Station on Anvers Island is located at (64.77°S 64.05°W) and is Antarctica's only U.S. station north of the Antarctic Circle. Construction finished in 1968. Around 50 people can inhabit Palmer Station at one time. The station is named for Nathaniel B. Palmer, likely to have been one of the first three persons to see Antarctica. There are science labs in the station, as well as a dock.

The first Palmer station was built in 1965 on the small and nearby Amsler island, and it was left standing till the 1990s.

== Former British Antarctic Survey station ==
On Anvers Island, the British Antarctic Survey built and operated a station (Base N) for the purpose of survey and geology. It consisted of a hut and was occupied from 27 February 1955, until 10 January 1958. In 1958, the station was closed when local work was completed. Its hut was loaned to the U.S. Government on 2 July 1963, which converted it into a biological laboratory in January 1965 for use by American scientists at the nearby Palmer Station. The British station was open in support of an air facility from 1969 until 1971. It was destroyed by fire on 28 December 1971, while being renovated by the British Antarctic Survey. Debris was removed by the members of the US Antarctic Program in 1990/1991. Only concrete foundations remain.

A skiway was in use from 1969 to 1973. The air operations were transferred to Adelaide (Station T) in 1973 when the skiway deteriorated. The skiway remained intermittently in use until 15 November 1993.

== Ship aground ==
On 11 February 1972 the Lindblad Explorer ran aground near La Plaza Point, Antarctica. She was towed to Buenos Aires, Argentina and then to Kristiansand, Norway for repairs.

On 28 January 1989 the ARA Bahía Paraíso sank off Palmer Station and Anvers.

== D'Abnour Bay ==
D'Abnour Bay is a small bay 3 nautical miles (5.6 km; 3.5 mi) east-southeast of Cape Gronland in northern Anvers Island, Palmer Archipelago. First charted by the French Antarctic Expedition (1903–05) under J.B. Charcot, who named the bay for French naval officer Contre-amiral Richard d'Abnour.

== Geology ==
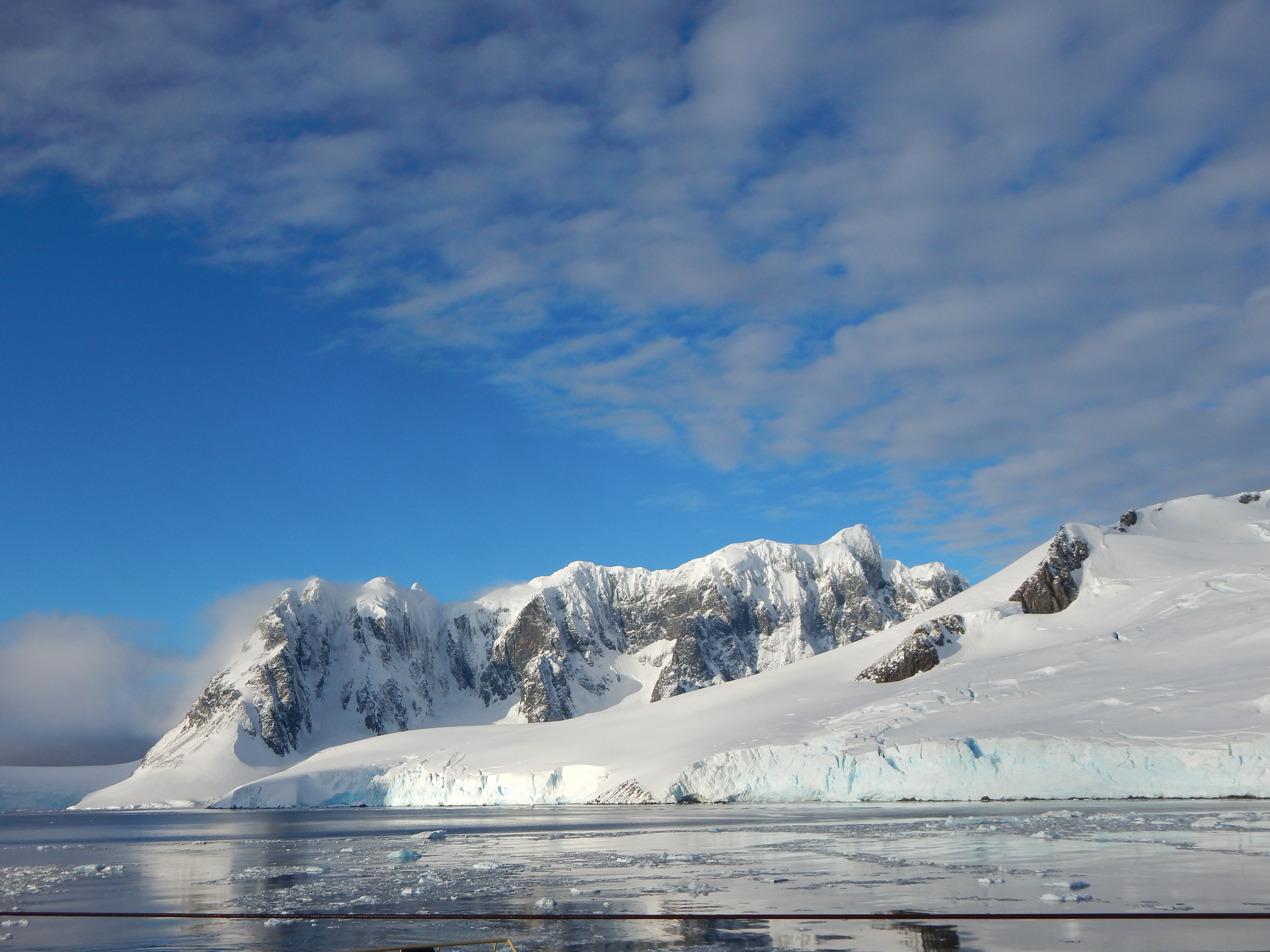
Neumayer Channel shown here, separates Anvers Island from Wiencke Island and Doumer Island to the east

The Anvers-Melchior Islands Tectonic Block includes the northwest portion of Anvers Island and the Melchior Islands offshore. The block is bounded on the southeast by the SW-NE trending strike-slip Fournier Fault. The block is composed of a volcanic suite which may correspond to the Antarctic Peninsula Volcanic Group. Granite, diorite, and tonalite plutons indicate three phases of intrusion dated at 68-54 Ma, 34 Ma, and 21-20 Ma. Two distinct systems of dykes are present, possibly of Tertiary age. The southeast portion of Anvers Island is part of the Neumayer Channel Tectonic Block.

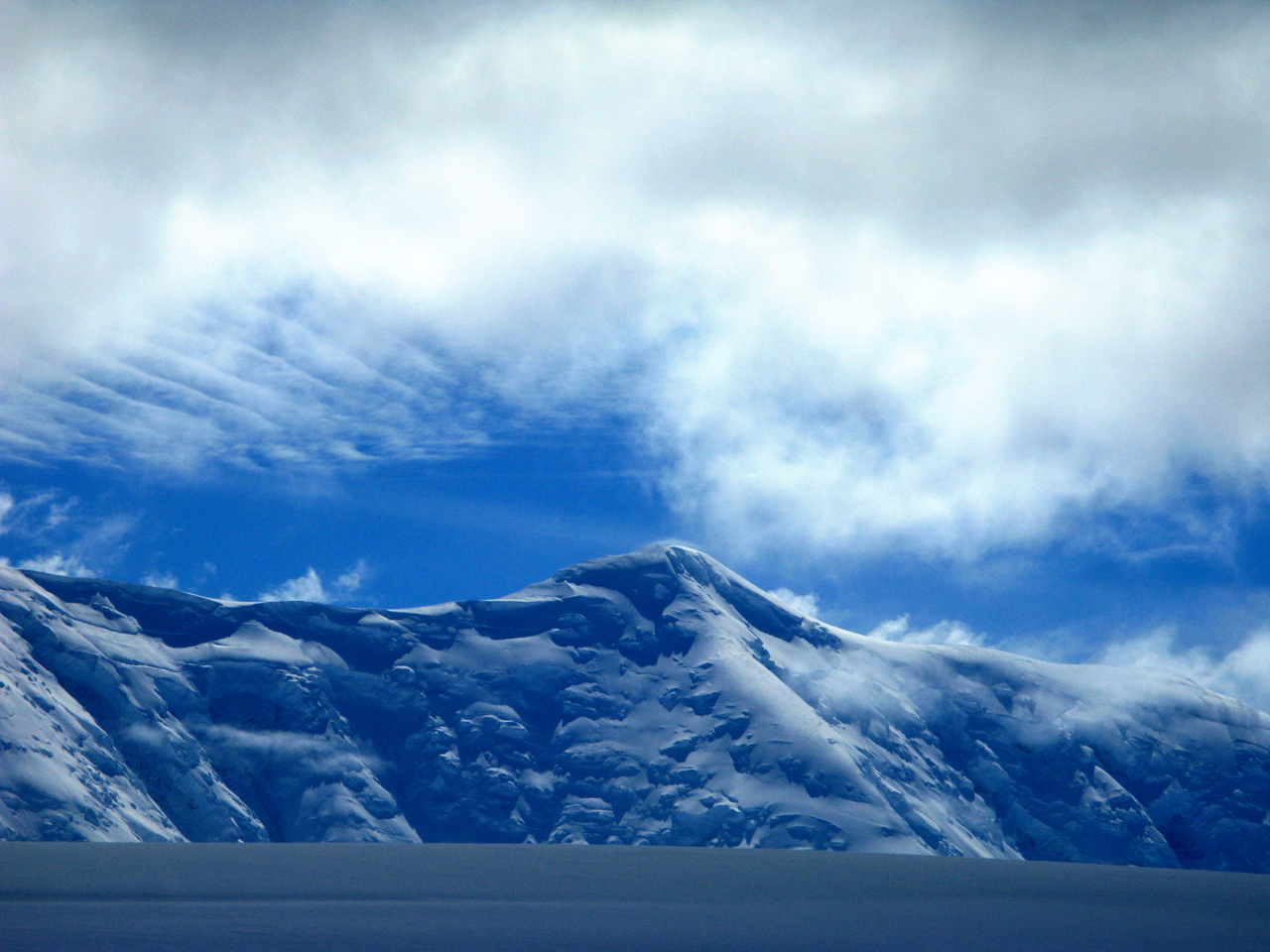
Anvers Island's Mount Francis (elevation 2 760 m)

== Cultural references ==
Anvers Island was the scene of the protagonist Grim Fiddle's "kingdom" and his later imprisonment in John Calvin Batchelor's novel The Birth of the People's Republic of Antarctica. Fiddle was an adventurer in a dystopian future world with many references to Norse mythology.

== Features ==
- Félicie Point, forms the south end of Lion Island, lying immediately east of Anvers Island
- Hippolyte Point, marks the northeast end of Lion Island, lying immediately east of Anvers Island
- Lion Sound, a small passage between Lion Island and the southeast coast of Anvers Island
- Zeus Ridge, a heavily crevassed ridge in central Anvers Island
- The Hump, a domed feature on the northern part of Anvers Island

== See also ==
- Gerlache Strait Geology
- Composite Antarctic Gazetteer
- List of Antarctic islands south of 60° S
- SCAR
- Lion Sound, a small passage between Lion Island and the southeast coast of Anvers Island, Antarctica
