= List of Antarctic and subantarctic islands =

This is a list of Antarctic and sub-Antarctic islands.

- Antarctic islands are, in the strict sense, the islands around mainland Antarctica, situated on the Antarctic Plate, and south of the Antarctic Convergence. According to the terms of the Antarctic Treaty, claims to sovereignty over lands south of 60° S are not asserted.
- Sub-Antarctic islands are the islands situated closer to another continental mainland or on another tectonic plate, but are biogeographically linked to the Antarctic or being parts of the Antarctic realm, roughly north of and adjacent to the Antarctic Convergence.

== List of sub-Antarctic islands ==
Antarctica and surrounding islands in relation to the Antarctic Convergence and the 60th parallel south

The following list of island groups contains the largest or most notable islands in their respective group. A more detailed list of islands in a given group may be found on their respective pages, when applicable.

=== A ===
- Antipodes Islands (49.67°S 178.77°E) (New Zealand)
  - Antipodes Island (49.69°S 178.78°E)
  - Bollons Island (49.645°S 178.819°E)
- Auckland Islands (50°42′S 166°05′E) (New Zealand)
  - Adams Island (50°52′59.99″S 166°04′59.99″E)
  - Adams Rocks (50.85478°S 165.900922°E)
  - Auckland Island (50°42′S 166°05′E)
  - Disappointment Island (50°36.25′S 165°58.38′E)
  - Enderby Island (50°31′S 166°17′E)
  - Ewing Island (50.529830°S 166.304053°E)
  - Rose Island (50.514°S 166.249°E)

=== B ===
- Bounty Islands (47°42′S 179°04′E) (New Zealand)
  - Depot Island (47°45′05″S 179°01′25″E)

=== C ===
- Campbell Islands (New Zealand)
  - Campbell Island (52°32.4′S 169°8.7′E)
  - Dent Island (52°31.15′S 169°3.75′E)
  - Folly Island or Folly Islands (52°31′48.03″S 169°2′35.51″E)
  - Jacquemart Island (52°37′S 169°7.5′E)
- Crozet Islands (French: Îles Crozet or officially Archipel Crozet) (France)
  - L'Occidental (Western Group)
    - Île aux Cochons (Pig Island) (46°06′S 50°14′E)
    - Île des Pingouins (Penguin Island) (46°27′S 50°23′E)
    - Îlots des Apôtres (Apostle Islets) (45°58′S 50°27′E)
  - L'Oriental (Eastern Group)
    - Île de la Possession (Possession Island) (46°24′S 51°46′E)
    - Île de l'Est (East Island) (46°26′S 52°18′E)

=== D ===
- Diego Ramírez Islands (56°30′S 68°43′W) (Chile)
  - Águila Islet (56°32′15″S 68°43′10″W)
  - Isla Bartolomé (56°32′S 68°43′W)
  - Isla Gonzalo (56°31′30″S 68°41′00″W)

=== F ===
- Falkland Islands (51°33′S 59°49′W) (United Kingdom)
  - East Falkland (52°0′0″S 59°0′0″W)
  - Pebble Island (51°18′11″S 59°37′46″W)
  - Saunders Island (51°20′34″S 60°10′50″W)
  - Weddell Island (51°52′43″S 61°00′24″W)
  - West Falkland (51°47′51″S 60°07′55″W)

=== I ===
- Ildefonso Islands (55°44′S 69°26′W) (Chile)

=== M ===
- Macquarie Island (54°37′S 158°51′E) (Australia)
  - Bishop and Clerk Islets (55°00′S 158°42′E)
  - Judge and Clerk Islets (54°21′S 159°00′E)

=== P ===
- Prince Edward Islands (46°46′23″S 37°51′09″E) (South Africa)

=== S ===
- Saint Paul and Amsterdam Islands (38°16′10″S 77°32′30″E) (France)
  - Amsterdam Island (37°49′33″S 77°33′17″E)
  - Saint Paul Island (38°43′48″S 77°31′20″E)
- Snares Islands (48°01′S 166°32′E) (New Zealand)
  - Alert Stack (48°02′15″S 166°34′30″E)
  - Broughton Island (48°02′35″S 166°37′15″E)
  - North East Island (48°01′30″S 166°36′10″E)
  - Western Chain (48°03′0″S 166°30′30″E)

=== T ===
- Tierra del Fuego (54°00′S 70°00′W) (Argentina and Chile)
  - Isla Grande (54°S 69°W)
  - Aracena Island (54°10′S 71°20′W)
  - Clarence Island (54°10′S 71°50′W)
  - Dawson Island (53.97°S 70.58°W)
  - Desolación Island (53.10°S 73.90°W)
  - Hermite Islands (55.8333°S 67.4167°W)
  - Hoste Island (55°15′S 69°0′W)
  - Navarino Island (55°05′03.46″S 67°38′33.83″W)
  - Picton, Lennox and Nueva (55.03°S 66.95°W)
  - Santa Inés Island (53°45′S 72°45′W)
  - Wollaston Islands (55°40′S 67°30′W)

== List of Antarctic islands north of 60° S ==
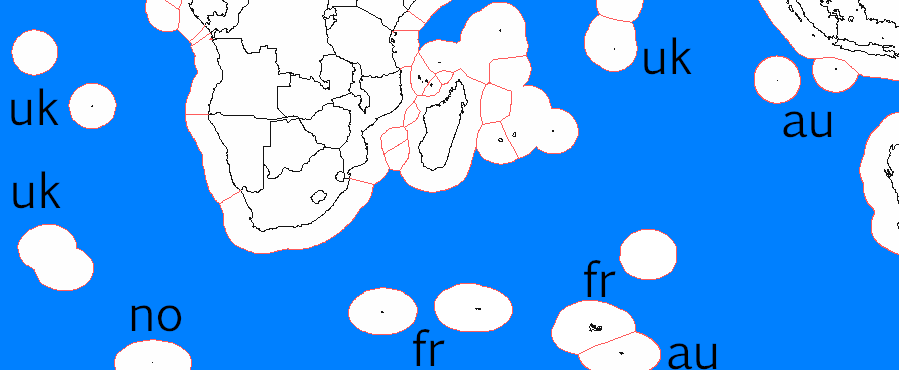
Oceanic islands between the Equator, 60°S, 20°W, and 115°E are the only Southern Hemisphere lands (besides East Timor) outside the five southern nuclear-weapon-free zones. Bouvet Island and the Kerguelen Islands are Antarctic islands on this map but outside the Antarctic NWFZ. Australian islands are parts of the South Pacific NWFZ. South Georgia and the South Sandwich Islands is in the Latin American NWFZ and not on this map.

- Bouvet Island (Bouvetøya) (54°26′S 03°24′E) (Norway)
- Heard Island and McDonald Islands (HIMI) (53°00′S 73°00′E) (Australia)
  - Heard Island (53°06′S 73°31′E)
  - McDonald Islands (53°03′S 72°37′E)
- Kerguelen Islands (49°15′S 69°35′E) (France)
  - Île Foch (49°0′S 69°17′E)
  - Île Howe (48°52′S 69°27′E)
  - Île Saint-Lanne Gramont (48°55′S 69°12′E)
  - Île du Port (49°11′S 69°36′E)
  - Île Longue (49°32′S 69°54′E)
  - Île Haute (49°22′S 69°54′E)
  - Île Australia (49°27′S 69°50′E)
  - Île de l'Ouest (49°21′S 68°44′E)
  - Îles du Prince-de-Monaco (49°36′S 69°14′E)
  - Îles Nuageuses (48°37′S 68°44′E)
  - Îles de Boynes (50°01′S 58°52′E)
  - Îles Leygues (48°41′S 69°29′E)
  - Île Altazin (49°38′S 69°45′E)
  - Île Gaby (49°39′S 69°46′E)
- South Georgia and the South Sandwich Islands (United Kingdom; claimed by Argentina)
  - South Georgia Group
    - The main island (South Georgia Island) and its adjacent islands
      - South Georgia Island, the main island (54°15′S 36°45′W) (variant names: Isla San Pedro, Sør-Georgia, Sydgeorgien, Süd-Georgien; historically Roché Island, Isle of Georgia)
        - Brain Island (54°10′S 36°42′W)
      - Bird Island (54°00′S 38°03′W)
      - Annenkov Island (54°29′S 37°05′W)
      - Coal Island (54°2′S 37°57′W)
      - Cooper Island (54°48′S 35°47′W)
      - Pickersgill Islands (54°37′S 36°45′W)
      - Saddle Island (54°08′25″S 37°44′57″W)
      - Welcome Islands (53°58′S 37°29′W)
      - Willis Islands (54°00′S 38°11′W)
      - Black Rocks (54°08′S 36°38′W)
    - The Shag Rocks and the Black Rock
      - Shag Rocks (53°33′S 42°02′W) 185 km west-northwest of South Georgia Island
      - Black Rock (53°39′S 41°48′W) 169 km west-northwest of South Georgia Island and 16 km southeast of the Shag Rocks
    - Clerke Rocks (55°01′S 34°41′W) 56 km east-southeast of South Georgia Island
    - Vestfold Island (54°22′S 36°55′W)
    - Vincent Islands (54°9′S 37°16′W)
  - South Sandwich Islands (57°45′S 26°30′W)
    - Bristol Island (59°01′S 26°32′W)
    - Brothers Rocks (57°46′S 26°25′W
    - Montagu Island (58.45°S 26.36°W)
    - Saunders Island (57.80°S 26.49°W)
    - Southern Thule (59.42°S 27.23°W)
      - Bellingshausen Island (59°25′S 27°5′W)
      - Cook Island (59°27′S 027°10′W)
      - Thule Island (59.44°S 27.38°W)
    - Traversay Islands (56°36′S 27°43′W)
      - Leskov Island (56°40′21″S 28°06′00″W)
      - Visokoi Island (56°42′S 27°09′W)
      - Zavodovski Island (56.30°S 27.58°W)
    - Candlemas Islands (57°03′S 26°43′W)
      - Candlemas Island (57.09°S 26.71°W)
        - Boot Rock (57°3′S 26°39′W)
      - Vindication Island (57°07′03″S 26°48′54″W)
        - Buddha Rock (57°4′S 26°47′W)

== List of largest Antarctic islands south of 60° S by area ==
Area data are from the USGS unless otherwise specified. This list does not include ice rises such as Berkner Island and Roosevelt Island.

Island	Area (km^{2})	Highest point (m)	Coordinates	Ref
Alexander Island	52,223	2,976	70°46′S 71°15′W	
Thurston Island	12,760		72°10′S 99°00′W	
Carney Island	7,353		73°56′S 121°00′W	
Siple Island	6,390	3,110	73°44′S 125°12′W	
Adelaide Island	4,463	3,918	67°12′S 68°30′W	
Spaatz Island	3,655		73°00′S 75°00′W	
James Ross Island	2,470	1,628	64°12′S 57°45′W	
Ross Island	2,431	3,794	77°30′S 167°45′E	
Charcot Island	2,209		69°45′S 75°15′W	
Anvers Island	2,076	2,821	64°36′S 63°30′W	
Smyley Island	1,701		72°43′S 78°33′W	
Joinville Island	1,553	765	63°21′S 55°40′W	
Latady Island	1,433		70°45′S 74°35′W	
King George Island	1,153	655	62°23′S 58°27′W	
Mill Island	949	326	65°30′S 100°40′E	
Brabant Island	891	2,522	64°15′S 62°20′W	
Hearst Island	869	365	69°25′S 62°10′W	
Livingston Island	824	1,700	62°36′S 60°30′W	
Dean Island	818		74°30′S 127°35′W	
Grant Island	774	580	74°28′S 131°35′W	
Masson Island	557	471	66°08′S 96°35′E	
Renaud Island	513		65°42′S 66°00′W	
Rothschild Island	475		70°45′S 74°35′W	
Elephant Island	465	852	61°01′S 54°54′W	
D'Urville Island	425	210	63°06′S 56°15′W	
Coronation Island	418	1,278	60°26′S 45°43′W	
Sherman Island	418	186	72°40′S 99°45′W	
Bowman Island	369		65°16′S 103°6′E	
Sturge Island	293	945	67°26′S 164°47′E	
Drygalski Island	213		65°45′S 92°30′E	

== List of Antarctic islands south of 60° S ==
All these islands fall under the terms of the Antarctic Treaty. The list is not complete.

=== A ===
- Aagaard Islands
- Abbott Island (64°6′S 62°8′E)
- Abrupt Island (67°0′S 57°46′E)
- Achernar Island (66°58′S 57°12′E)
- Adams Island, Antarctica (66°33′S 92°35′E)
- Adelaide Island or Isla Adelaida or Isla Belgrano – west side of the Antarctic Peninsula (67°15′S 68°30′W)
- Afala Island
- Afuera Islands or Penguin Island or Dodge Rocks
- Aim Rocks
- Aitcho Islands
- Akin Island
- Akula Island
- Alabak Island
- Alamode Island
- Al'bov Rocks (66°28′S 126°45′E)
- Alcheh Island
- Alcock Island (64°14′S 61°8′W)
- Aldea Island
- Alectoria Island
- Alepu Rocks
- Alexander Island or Alexander I Island or Alexander I Land or Alexander Land or Alexander The First Island or Isla Alejandro I (71°00′S 70°00′W) (claimed by Argentina, Chile, and the United Kingdom)
- Alfeus Island
- Alino Island
- Alpha Island
- Alka Island
- Alphard Island
- Amiot Islands
- Amsler Island
- Anchorage Island (Antarctica)
- Anchorage Island, Princess Elizabeth Land
- Andersen Island
- Andrée Island
- Andresen Island
- Angelov Island
- Antenna Island
- Anton Island (66°2′S 134°28′E)
- Anvers Island or Antwerp Island or Antwerpen Island or Isla Amberes (64°33′S 63°35′W)
- Apéndice Island
- Apollo Island
- Araguez Island
- Ardley Island
- Arrowsmith Island
- Aspis Island
- Aspland Island
- Asses Ears
- Astor Island
- Astrolabe Island
- Atherton Islands (62°6′S 58°59′W)
- Atriceps Island
- Auster Islands
- Austin Rocks (63°26′S 61°4′W)
- Austral Island 66°30′S 110°39′E
- Austskjera
- Avian Island
- Avren Rocks
- Azimuth Islands
- Azuki Island 69°53′S 38°56′E

=== B ===
- Bablon Island
- Babushkin Island (69°6′S 157°36′E)
- Backer Islands
- Baffle Rock
- Bager Island
- Bakewell Island
- Balaena Islands
- Balleny Islands (66°55′S 163°45′E)
  - Borradaile Island (66°35′S 162°45′E)
  - Buckle Island (66°39′S 163°3′E)
  - Sabrina Island (66°57′S 163°17′E)
  - Sturge Island (67°25′S 164°44′E)
  - Young Island (66°17′S 162°25′E)
- Balsha Island
- Bandy Island (75°4′S 137°49′W)
- Bar Island
- Barlow Island
- Barratt Island
- Barrett Island
- Barrientos Island
- Barrier Island
- Baseline Rock
- Basso Island
- Baurene Island
- Bayard Islands
- Bazett Island
- Beagle Island
- Beak Island
- Bear Island (68°11′S 67°04′W)
- Bearing Island or Direction Island (64°33′S 62°02′W)
- Beaufort Island
- Beaumont Island
- Beaumont Skerries (64°46′S 64°19′W)
- Beaver Island
- Bedford Island
- Beer Island
- Bekas Rock
- Belchin Rock
- Belding Island
- Belogushev Island
- Benten Island
- Bennett Islands
- Berkley Island
- Berkner Island or Berkner Ice Rise or Hubley Island (79°30′S 49°30′W)
- Bernal Islands
- Bernard Island
- Bertha Island
- Berthelot Islands
  - Green Island (Berthelot Islands)
- Beslen Island
- Bielecki Island (64°46′S 64°29′W)
- Biggs Island
- Bilyana Island
- Biscoe Islands
  - Adolph Islands
  - Barcroft Islands
  - Bates Island
  - Irving Island
  - Watkins Island
  - Metis Island
  - St. Christopher Island
  - Bona Mansio Island
  - St. Brigid Island
  - Todorova Island
  - St. Isidore Island
  - Chakarov Island
  - Renaud Island
  - Lavoisier Island
  - Krogh Island
  - Pickwick Island
- Bizeux Rock
- Bizone Rock
- Black Island
- Blaiklock Island
- Blair Islands
- Blake Island
- Blåskimen Island
- Bluff Island
- Boatin Island
- Bodloperka Island
- Bølingen Islands
- Boobyalla Islands (67°15′S 46°34′E)
- Boogie Island (64°49′28″S 63°30′16″W)
- Borceguí Island (61°3′S 55°9′W)
- Boree Islands (67°41′S 45°20′E)
- Borg Island
- Bowl Island (67°9′S 50°50′E)
- Bowler Rocks
- Bowman Island (65°17′S 103°07′E)
- Boxing Island
- Brabant Island (64°15′S 62°20′W)
- Bradford Rock
- Bragg Islands
- Brash Island (63°24′S 54°55′W)
- Bratina Island (78°0′S 165°33′E)
- Breaker Island (64°46′S 64°07′W)
- Breccia Island (68°22′S 67°1′W)
- Bremen Island
- Breton Island
- Brewster Island
- Brian Island
- Bridgeman Island
- Brockhamp Islands
- Brødrene Rocks
- Broka Island
- Brooklyn Island
- Brosnahan Island (79°28′S 160°59′E)
- Buchino Rocks
- Büdel Islands
- Buffer Island
- Buffon Islands
- Bugge Islands
- Bulnes Island
- Bunt Island (67°9′S 50°57′E)
- Burke Island (73.13°S 105.1°W)
- Burkett Islands (66°56′S 50°19′E)
- Burnett Island
- Burtis Island (73°04′S 125°29′W)
- Butler Island (72°13′S 60°8′W)

=== C ===
- Cameron Island
- Canopus Islands
  - Canopus Island
  - Canopus Rocks
- Caraquet Rock
- Carlson Island
- Carney Island (73°57′S 121°00′W)
- Carrel Island
- Carter Island (73°59′S 114°57′W)
- Casabianca Island (64°49′S 63°31′W)
- Case Island (73°19′S 77°48′W)
- Castle Rock
- Casey Islands (64°44′S 64°16′W)
- Casy Island
- Cave Island
- Cecilia Island
- Centre Island
- Chabrier Rock
- Challenger Island
- Chameau Island
- Chandler Island
- Chappel Island
- Chata Rock
- Charcot Island or Charcot Land (69°45′S 75°15′W)
- Charlton Island
- Chatos Islands
- Chavez Island
- Cheesman Island (69°44′S 75°5′W)
- Cherry Island
- Chërnyy Island (66°8′S 101°4′E)
- Child Rocks
- Chiprovtsi Islets
- Christine Island (64°48′S 64°02′W)
- Chukovezer Island
- Churicheni Island
- Claquebue Island
- Clarence Island
- Clark Island
- Cleft Island
- Clements Island
- Cliff Island
- Close Islands (67°1′S 144°27′E)
- Clow Island (77°37′S 163°11′E)
- Cobalescou Island (64°11′S 61°39′W)
- Cockburn Island
- Compass Island
- Cono Island
- Consort Islands
- Conway Island
- Cormorant Island (64°48′S 63°58′W)
- Cornet Island
- Cornish Islands (66°59′S 67°28′W)
- Cornwall Island
- Corry Island
- Couling Island
- Coulman Island
- Courtier Islands
- Covey Rocks
- Cowell Island
- Craggy Island
- Crohn Island (67°7′S 50°52′E)
- Crouch Island (67°49′S 68°58′W)
- Cruiser Rocks
- Cruzen Island (74°47′S 140°42′W)
- Curie Island (66°39′S 140°3′E)
- Curtis Island
- Curzon Islands
- Cuverville Island (64°41′S 62°38′W) – west side of the Antarctic Peninsula

=== D ===
- Dailey Islands
  - West Dailey Island
  - Juergens Island
  - Hatcher Island
  - Uberuaga Island
  - Kuechle Island
- Dales Island
- Dålk Island
- Danco Island or Isla Dedo (64°44′S 62°37′W) – west side of the Antarctic Peninsula
- Danger Islands
- Daniel Island
- Darbel Islands
- Darboux Island
- Darwin Island
- Davidson Island
- Davis Island
- Davis Islands
- Day Island
- Dean Island 74°30′S 127°35′W
- DeAtley Island (73°18′S 73°54′W)
- Debenham Islands (68°08′S 67°07′W)
  - Ann Island
  - Audrey Island
  - Barbara Island
  - Barry Island (68°08′S 67°07′W)
- Debutante Island
- Decazes Island
- Deception Island
- Dee Island
- DeLaca Island (64°47′S 64°07′W)
- Delaite Island
- Dellbridge Islands
  - Big Razorback Island
  - Inaccessible Island
  - Little Razorback Island
  - Tent Island
- Delta Island
- Demidov Island (67°29′S 48°21′E)
- Dendtler Island
- Deniau Island
- Departure Rocks
- Depot Island, Kemp Land
- Depot Island, Victoria Land
- Derby Island (66°38′S 140°5′E)
- Descartes Island
- Desolation Island
- Detaille Island
- Deverall Island (81°28′S 161°54′E)
- Dewart Island
- D'Hainaut Island (63°54′S 60°47′W)
- Diamonen Island
- Diaz Rock
- Dieglman Island
- Dinea Island
- Dink Island
- Dint Island (69°17′S 71°49′W)
- Diomedea Island
- Dion Islands
- Direction Island or Bearing Island (64°33′S 62°02′W)
- Dismal Island
- Dixson Island
- Dlagnya Rocks
- Dodd Island
- Dodman Island
- Dolleman Island (70°37′S 60°45′W)
- Donovan Islands
  - Chappel Island
  - Glasgal Island
  - Grinnell Island
  - Lilienthal Island
- Dorsey Island (70°22′S 71°33′W)
- Douanier Rock
- Double Islands
- Douglas Islands
- Doumer Island
- Dream Island (64°44′S 64°14′W)
- Driscoll Island (76°12′S 146°55′W)
- Dru Rock
- Drygalski Island (65°45′S 92°30′E)
- DuBois Island
- Duchaylard Island
- Dumbbell Island
- Dumoulin Islands (66°37′S 140°4′E)
- Dunbar Islands
- Dundee Island (63°30′S 55°55′W) – off tip of the Antarctic Peninsula
- Duroch Islands
  - Cohen Islands
  - Gándara Island
  - Kopaitic Island
  - Largo Island
  - Link Island
  - Ortiz Island
  - Pebbly Mudstone Island
  - Ponce Island
  - Wisconsin Islands
- Dustin Island 72°34′S 094°48′W
- Dyer Island
- Dyment Island (74°8′S 102°2′W)
- Dynamite Island

=== E ===
- Eadie Island
- Eagle Island
- Earle Island (63°29′S 54°47′W)
- Early Islands (73°40′S 101°40′W)
- Eddystone Rocks
- Edisto Rocks
- Edman Island
- Edwards Islands
- Egg Island
- Eichorst Island (64°47′S 64°04′W)
- Einstøding Islands (67°28′S 61°41′E)
- Einstødingen Island (69°39′S 38°50′E)
- Elephant Rocks (64°46′S 64°05′W)
- Elisabethinsel
- Embassy Islands (67°53′S 68°45′W)
- Emeline Island
- Emen Island
- Emma Island
- Empereur Island
- Emperor Island
- Endresen Islands
- Enterprise Island or Isla Lientur or Isla Nansen Norte or North Nansen Island (64°32′S 62°00′W)
- Esperanto Island
- Esplin Islands
- Eta Island
- Etna Island (63°5′S 55°9′W)
- Ewing Island (69°54′S 61°13′W)
- Express Island

=== F ===
- Farrington Island
- Farwell Island 72°51′S 91°5′W
- Feniks Island
- Field Rock
- Filla Island
- Fish Islands
  - Flounder Island
  - Mackerel Island
  - The Minnows
  - Salmon Island
  - Trout Island
- Fisher Island (77°08′S 154°00′W)
- Fitzroy Island
- Fizalia Island
- Fizkin Island
- Flat Islands (67°36′S 62°49′E)
  - Béchervaise Island
  - East Budd Island
  - Evans Island (67°36′S 62°48′E)
  - Stinear Island
  - West Budd Island
- Flatvaer Islands (69°01′S 39°33′E)
  - East Ongul Island (69°1′S 39°35′E)
  - Ongul Island (69°1′S 39°32′E)
- Flein Island (69°45′S 39°5′E)
- Fleurus Island
- Florence Island (66°38′S 140°5′E)
- Fletcher Islands (66°53′S 143°05′E)
  - Fletcher Island
- Flutter Island
- Flyspot Rocks
- Fold Island
- Folger Rock
- Foote Islands
- Foreland Island
- Forrester Island 74°9′S 132°13′W
- Fourier Island
- Fowler Islands
- Fram Islands (66°38′S 139°50′E)
- Francis Island (67°37′S 64°45′W)
- Franklin Island (76°5′S 168°19′E)
- Frazier Islands
  - Charlton Island
  - Dewart Island
  - Nelly Island
- Fregata Island
- Friedburginsel
- Fuente Rock
- Fuller Island
- Fuller Rock

=== G ===
- Galiche Rock
- Galten Islands
- Garde Islands
- Garnet Rocks
- Gaston Islands
- Geologists Island
- Gibbney Island (67°33′S 62°20′E)
- Gibbous Rocks
- Gibbs Island
- Giganteus Island
- Gillock Island (70°26′S 71°52′E)
- Girdler Island
- Ginger Islands (67°45′S 68°42′W)
- Glarus Island
- Glasgal Island
- Glinka Islands (69°23′S 72°17′W)
- Glumche Island
- Gnome Island (67°33′S 66°50′W)
- Gnomon Island
- Gränicher Island
- Graovo Rocks
- Gremlin Island
- Grod Island
- Goetschy Island (64°52′S 63°31′W)
- González Island
- Goritsa Rocks
- Gourdin Island
- Gouverneur Island
- Grace Rock
- Grant Island (74°28′S 131°35′W)
- Greben' Island (66°31′S 93°1′E)
- Grinnell Island
- Groves Island (75°30′S 143°5′W)
- Guardian Rock
- Guano Island
- Guébriant Islands
- Guesalaga Island (64°16′S 61°59′W)
- Guile Island
- Guyer Rock
- Guyou Islands

=== H ===
- Håkollen Island (67°0′S 57°15′E)
- Hailstorm Island
- Half Moon Island
- Halfway Island (64°45′S 64°12′W)
- Hanka Island
- Hannam Islands (66°55′S 142°58′E)
- Hansen Island
- Hansen Rocks
- Haralambiev Island
- Harrop Island
- Harry Island (64°8′S 61°59′W)
- Harvey Islands (67°43′S 45°33′E)
- Haswell Islands
  - Haswell Island (66°31′S 93°0′E)
- Hatch Islands
- Havstein Island
- Hawker Island
- Hayrick Island
- Head Island (64°31′S 62°55′W)
- Heap Island
- Hearst Island (69°25′S 062°10′W)
- Heckmann Island (67°20′S 61°3′E)
- Hedgehog Island (72°12′S 170°0′E)
- Heftye Island (71°59′S 171°6′E)
- Hélène Island (66°37′S 139°44′E)
- Henderson Island (66°22′S 97°10′E)
- Henfield Rock
- Henkes Islands (67°48′S 68°56′W)
- Hennessy Islands
- Henry Islands
- Hermit Island (64°48′S 64°02′W)
- Heroína Island (63°24′S 54°36′W)
- Hervé Island
- Heywood Island
- Hiyoko Island (69°0′S 39°33′E)
- Hjart Island (69°38′S 39°16′E)
- Hoatsin Island
- Hobbs Islands
- Hobby Rocks
- Hodgeman Islands (67°1′S 144°14′E)
- Hogg Islands (67°31′S 61°37′E)
- Holmes Island
- Holmes Rock
- Honkala Island
- Honores Rock
- Hoodwink Island (67°1′S 66°52′W)
- Hop Island
- Horseshoe Island
- Horvath Island (66°19′S 67°8′W)
- Hoseason Island 63°44′S 61°41′W
- Houle Island
- Hovde Island
- Hugo Island 64°57′S 65°45′W
- Hum Island (67°21′S 59°38′E)
- Humble Island (64°46′S 64°06′W)
- Hump Island
- Hydrographer Islands

=== I ===
- Ibar Rocks
- Ifo Island (66°38′S 139°44′E)
- Imelin Island
- Inaccessible Island (77°39′S 166°21′E)
- Indrehovdeholmen
- Inexpressible Island (74°54′S 163°43′E)
- Islay Island (67°21′S 59°42′E)

=== J ===
- Jacobs Island (64°48′S 64°1′W)
- Jagar Islands
- Jagged Island (Graham Land)
- Jagged Island (South Shetland Islands)
- James Ross Island group
  - James Ross Island
- Janus Island (64°47′S 64°06′W)
- Jaynes Islands (73°59′S 104°15′W)
- Jenny Island (67°44′S 68°24′W)
- Jester Rock
- Jigsaw Islands (64°54′S 63°37′W)
- Jingle Island
- Jinks Island
- Jocelyn Islands
  - Lee Island
  - Petersen Island
  - Verner Island
- Johansen Islands (69°3′S 72°52′W)
- Johnson Island (Antarctica)- within the Abbot Ice Shelf about 14 nautical miles (26 km) SE of Dustin Island
- Joinville Island group
  - Joinville Island (63°15′S 55°45′W) – off tip of the Antarctic Peninsula
  - D'Urville Island (63°05′S 56°20′W) – off tip of the Antarctic Peninsula
- Jona Island (66°55′S 67°42′W)
- Jorge Island
- Joubert Rock
- June Island (68°8′S 67°7′W)
- Jurien Island (63°32′S 59°49′W)

=== K ===
- Kabile Island
- Kalmar Island
- Kalotina Island
- Kame Island (67°58′S 44°12′E)
- Kamelen Island
- Kamera Island
- Kaname Island (69°21′S 37°36′E)
- Kaprela Island
- Karelin Islands
- Karm Island
- Kartografov Island (69°12′S 157°43′E)
- Keel Island
- Keep Rock
- Kellas Islands
- Kellick Island
- Kereka Island
- Kevin Islands (63°17′S 57°44′W)
- Keyhole Island
- Khmara Island (66°33′S 93°0′E)
- Kidd Islands
- Kidson Island
- Kilby Island
- Kilifarevo Island
- Killingbeck Island
- Kirkwood Islands
- Kirsty Island
- Kirton Island
- Kista Rock
- Kitney Island
- Kizer Island
- Klakkane Islands
- Klamer Island
- Klung Islands
  - Klung Island
- Knezha Island
- Knight Rocks
- Kondor Island
- Kril Island
- Kring Islands
- Krok Island
- Kroshka Island
- Koala Island (67°34′S 47°53′E)
- Koechlin Island (66°42′S 67°38′W)
- Koll Rock
- Kolven Island (67°33′S 61°29′E)
- Komuniga Island
- Kondor Island
- Kormoran Island
- Kosatka Island
- Koshava Island
- Kostenurka Island
- Kostilka Island
- Kostov Island
- Kovach Island
- Krivus Island
- Krok Island (67°2′S 57°46′E)
- Kroshka Island (70°40′S 2°5′E)
- Kurumi Island (69°1′S 39°28′E)

=== L ===
- La Conchée
- Lacuna Island
- Lafarge Rocks
- Laggard Island (64°49′S 64°02′W)
- Lagoon Island
- Lagotellerie Island
- Lagrange Island
- Lahille Island
- Lake Island
- Laktionov Island
- Lamantin Island
- Lamarck Island
- Lambda Island
- Lamya Island
- Landrum Island
- Lang Island
- Langhofer Island (72°32′S 93°2′W)
- Lapa Island
- Laplace Island
- Lapteva Island
- Larrouy Island
- Laseron Islands (66°59′S 142°48′E)
- Lauff Island 73°3′S 126°8′W
- Låvebrua Island
- Law Islands
- Latady Island (70°45′S 74°35′W)
- Lecointe Island
- Leeve Island
- Leningradskiy Island
- Léonie Island
- Léonie Islands
- Leppe Island
- Lesidren Island
- Leskov Island
- Levy Island
- Lewis Island
- Liard Island (66°51′S 67°25′W)
- Liberty Rocks
- Lichen Island
- Liège Island (64.02°S 61.91°W)
- Lientur Rocks
- Lilienthal Island
- Limitrophe Island (64°48′S 64°01′W)
- Limoza Island
- Limpet Island (67°38′S 68°18′W)
- Lindenberg Island
- Lion Island
- Lippmann Islands
- Lipps Island (64°46′S 64°07′W)
- Litchfield Island (64°46′S 64°06′W)
- Livingston Island (62°36′S 60°30′W)
- Llanquihue Islands
  - Dog Island
- Lobodon Island (64°5′S 61°35′W)
- Lodge Rock
- Long Island
- Long Rock
- Louise Island
- Low Rock
- Lucas Island
- Lugg Island (68°32′S 77°57′E)
- Luna Island
- Lurker Rock
- Lyutibrod Rocks

=== M ===
- Mackellar Islands
  - Greater Mackellar Island
  - Lesser Mackellar Island (66°58′S 142°39′E)
- Macklin Island
- Maglizh Rocks
- Magnetic Island
- Maher Island 72°58′S 126°22′W
- Makresh Rocks
- Malus Island (66°14′S 65°45′W)
- Mame Island (69°1′S 39°29′E)
- Manchot Island
- Mane Skerry
- Manning Island (69°21′S 76°20′E)
- Manoury Island (64°27′S 62°50′W)
- Marégraphe Island (66°40′S 140°0′E)
- Marguerite Island (66°47′S 141°23′E)
- Marie Island
- Mariholm (60°45′S 45°42′W)
- Mariner Islands
- Marshall Archipelago
  - Benton Island 77°4′S 147°53′W
  - Cronenwett Island 77°0′S 150°0′W
  - Grinder Island 77°34′S 149°20′W
  - Hannah Island 76°39′S 148°48′W
  - Hutchinson Island
  - Kramer Island 77°14′S 147°10′W
  - Madden Island 77°27′S 149°3′W
  - Orr Island 77°38′S 149°36′W
  - Przybyszewski Island 76°58′S 148°45′W
  - Thode Island 77°2′S 148°3′W
- Martin Island (66°44′S 57°0′E)
- Martin Islands
- Masson Island or Mission Island (66°08′S 96°35′E)
- Masteyra Island
- McCallie Rocks
- McCarthy Island (67°16′S 59°25′E)
- McConnel Islands
- McKinnon Island
- McKinzie Islands
- McMahon Islands (67°38′40″S 45°58′30″E)
- McMullin Island
- McNamara Island
- Meade Islands
- Meduza Island
- Megaw Island
- Meholmen Island (68°58′S 39°32′E)
- Melanita Island
- Melchior Islands
  - Alpha Island
  - Bremen Island
  - Delta Island
  - Eta Island
  - Lambda Island
  - Pabellon Island
  - Pi Islands
  - Psi Islands
  - Omega Island
  - Sigma Islands
  - Tripod Island
- Meldia Rock
- Mellona Rocks
- Melyane Island
- Mendori Island
- Ménier Island
- Merger Island (70°6′S 71°13′W)
- Mica Islands
- Mickle Island (77°34′S 166°13′E)
- Mida Island
- Midas Island
- Mikhaylov Island
- Mikkelsen Islands
- Miladinovi Islets
- Miles Island (66°4′S 101°15′E)
- Milev Rocks
- Mill Island (65°30′S 100°40′E)
- Millerand Island (68°09′S 67°13′W)
- Milnes Island
- Minamo Island (69°39′S 39°37′E)
- Mirage Island
- Mite Skerry
- Mitsudomoe Islands (69°57′S 38°45′E)
- Molecule Island
- Molholm Island
- Monge Island
- Moody Island 77°20′S 149°12′W
- Morency Island (71°2′S 61°9′W)
- Morris Island 76°37′S 147°48′W
- Morris Rock
- Moss Islands
- Mousinho Island (70°38′S 71°58′E)
- Moureaux Islands
- Moyes Islands
- Mügge Island (66°55′S 67°45′W)
- Mule Island
- Mulga Island (67°14′S 46°43′E)
- Mulroy Island
- Mumm Islands
- Murphy Rocks
- Murray Island
- Mushroom Island
- Myall Islands

=== N ===
- Nabbøya
- Nadezhdy Island
- Nakaya Islands
- Nansen Island or Isla Nansen Sur (64°35′S 62°06′W)
- Napier Island (69°14′00″S 67°47′00″W)
- Nelly Island
- Nelson Rock (67°23′S 62°45′E)
- Neny Island or Neny Islands (68°12′S 67°03′W)
- Nesholmen Island
- Nestorov Island
- Nesøya
- New Rock
- Newman Island (75°39′S 145°30′W)
- Newton Island
- The Niblets
- Nikudin Rock
- Niznik Island (69°47′S 68°30′W)
- Nøkkel Island
- Nøkkelholmane Islands
- Nolan Island 77°13′S 147°24′W
- Nord Island
- North Nansen Island or Enterprise Island or Isla Lientur or Isla Nansen Norte (64°32′S 62°00′W)
- Nøst Island
- Novyy Island
- Numbat Island
- Nunn Island 74°17′S 117°0′W
- Nupkins Island
- Nusser Island

=== O ===
- O'Brien Island
- Oescus Island
- Ofelia Island
- Ohlin Island or Bailys Island (63°30′S 60°07′W)
- Okol Rocks
- Oldham Island
- Oldroyd Island
- Oliver Island
- Olson Island
- Omega Island
- Omicron Islands (64°21′S 62°55′W)
- Ommundsen Island (66°20′S 110°22′E)
- Ondori Island
- Ongley Island
- Ongulgalten Island
- Ongulkalven Island
- Onogur Islands
- Oom Island
- Opaka Rocks
- Orne Islands
- Orsoya Rocks
- Osenovlag Island
- Osøya
- Ouellette Island (64°47′S 64°25′W)
- Outcast Islands (64°49′S 64°08′W)
- Owen Island
- Owston Islands
- Oyako Islands
- Oyayubi Island
- Øygarden Group

=== P ===
- Padda Island
- Palmer Archipelago
  - Abbott Island
  - Anvers Island
  - Auguste Island
  - Bills Island
  - Brabant Island
  - Casabianca Island
  - Cobalcescou Island
  - Cormorant Island
  - Davis Island
  - Doumer Island
  - Dream Island
  - Fournier Island
  - Halfway Island
  - Hermit Island
  - Humble Island
  - Janus Island
  - Joubin Islands
  - Laggard Island
  - Lecointe Island
  - Liège Island
  - Litchfield Island
  - Melchior Islands
    - Alpha Island
    - Bremen Island
    - Delta Island
    - Eta Island
    - Lambda Island
    - Pabellon Island
    - Psi Islands
    - Omega Island
    - Sigma Islands
    - Tripod Island
  - Ohlin Island
  - Outcast Islands
  - Spert Island
  - Torgersen Island
  - Tower Island
  - Two Hummock Island
  - Wiencke Island
  - Yoke Island
  - Zigzag Island
- Padpadak Island
- Palosuo Islands
- Papazov Island
- Parallactic Islands (67°32′S 62°46′E)
  - Parallactic Island
- Partizan Island
- Pasarel Island
- Pascal Island
- Pasteur Island
- Pate Island
- Patella Island (63°8′S 55°29′W)
- Paterson Islands
- Patresh Rock
- Patricia Islands
- Paul Islands (64°16′S 63°44′W)
- Paulet Island (63°35′S 55°47′W) – tiny island southeast of Dundee Island
- Pauling Islands
- Peage Island
- Peake-Jones Rock
- Pegas Island
- Peine Island (63°24′S 54°42′W)
- Pelikan Island
- Pelseneer Island
- Penola Island
- Peperuda Island
- Perch Island
- Perivol Rock
- Peter I Island (claimed by Norway)
- Petermann Island
- Petrel Island
- Petrelik Island
- Petty Rocks
- Pfaff Island (66°54′S 67°44′W)
- Phanagoria Island
- Phelps Island
- Phils Island (64°30′S 63°0′W)
- Phoque Island (66°49′S 141°24′E)
- Pig Rock
- Pigmy Rock
- Pila Island
- Piñero Island
- Pingvin Island (65°45′S 81°50′E)
- Pinn Island (67°34′S 47°55′E)
- Pinnacle Rock (61°06′S 54°47′W)
- Pipkin Rock
- Pisanitsa Island
- Piton Island
- Pitt Islands
- Plaice Island
- Plog Island (68°32′S 78°0′E)
- Pod Rocks
- Pogledets Island
- Polich Island
- Pollholmen
- Ponton Island
- Pordim Islands
- Possession Islands (71°56′S 171°10′E)
  - Possession Island (71°52′S 171°12′E)
- Postillion Rock
- Potmess Rocks
- Pourquoi Pas Island (67°41′S 67°28′W)
- Powder Island (69°32′S 68°47′W)
- Pranke Island 73°14′S 124°55′W
- Presnakov Island
- Preston Island
- Priboy Rocks
- Prisad Island
- Proclamation Island
- Prosechen Island
- Puffball Islands
- Pullen Island (72°35′S 60°57′W)
- Pup Rock
- Puzzle Islands
- Pyramid Island
- Pyrites Island
- Pyrox Island
- Pythia Island

=== Q ===
- Query Island (68°48′S 67°12′W)
- Quilp Rock

=== R ===
- Rabisha Rocks
- Rabot Island
- Racovitza Islands (64°31′S 62°5′W)
- Radford Island (76°54′S 146°36′W)
- Rak Island
- Raklitsa Island
- Ralida Island
- Rambler Island
- Ramírez Island (69°9′S 68°27′W)
- Randall Rocks
- Ranvik Island (68°54′S 77°50′E)
- Rasmussen Island
- Rauer Islands (68°51′S 77°50′E)
- Ravn Rock
- Red Island (63°44′S 57°52′W)
- Redfearn Island (68°37′S 77°53′E)
- Redina Island
- Reference Islands (68°12′S 67°10′W)
- Refuge Islands
- Reluctant Island (67°50′S 67°5′W)
- Renard Island (65°01′34″S 63°46′35″W)
- Rescape Islands (66°49′S 141°22′E)
- Ressac Island
- Retour Island
- Revolver Island
- Revsnes Island (69°17′S 39°37′E)
- Rho Islands (64°17′S 63°0′W)
- Rhyolite Islands (69°40′S 68°35′W)
- Ribnik Island
- Riddle Islands (65°39′S 64°33′W)
- Ridge Island
- Ridley Island
- Rigel Skerries
- Rigsby Islands (66°40′S 67°37′W)
- Riksa Islands
- Ring Rock
- Robertson Island (65°10′S 59°37′W)
- Robertson Islands
- Rocca Islands
- Rog Island
- Rogozen Island
- Rogulyat Island
- Rollet Island (65°2′S 64°3′W)
- Romeo Island
- Rongé Island (64°43′S 62°41′W)
- Rookery Islands
- Roosevelt Island (inside of Ross Sea) (79°25′S 162°00′W, claimed by New Zealand)
- Ross Archipelago
  - Beaufort Island
  - Black Island
  - Dellbridge Islands
    - Inaccessible Island
    - Tent Island
  - Ross Island (inside of Ross Sea) (77°30′S 168°00′E) (claimed by New Zealand)
  - White Island
- Rostand Island
- Rotalia Island
- Rothschild Island 69°36′S 72°33′W
- Rouse Islands (67°34′48″S 62°57′00″E)
- Roux Island
- Row Island (66°31′S 162°38′E)
- Rowett Island
- Rugged Island
- Rumpa Island
- Runaway Island
- Rusokastro Rock
- Ryrie Rock

=== S ===
- Safety Island
- Saffery Islands
- Sagita Island
- Sail Rock
- San Telmo Island
- Sanavirón Island (68°9′S 67°5′W)
- Sanctuary Islands (65°37′S 64°35′W)
- Sansom Islands
- Sawert Rocks
- Sawyer Island
- Schaefer Islands (73°40′S 103°24′W)
- Scholander Island (66°22′S 66°58′W)
- Schule Island
- Scott Island (67°24′S 179°55′W) (claimed by New Zealand)
- Seal Islands
  - Seal Island
- Seymour Island
- Shaula Island
- Shaw Islands
- Sheehan Islands
- Sheelagh Islands (66°32′S 50°12′E)
- Shepard Island (74°25′S 132°30′W)
- Sherman Island
- Shirley Island
- Short Island
- Shortcut Island
- Shut Island
- Sierra Island
- Sif Island
- Sigaren Islands
- Sigma Islands
- Sillard Islands
- Simeonov Island
- Sims Island (73°21′S 78°19′W)
- Single Island
- Siple Island (73°39′S 125°00′W)
- Sirius Islands (66°57′S 57°27′E)
- Skoba Island
- Skrino Rocks
- Slumkey Island
- Smiggers Island (65°27′S 65°21′W)
- Smith Rocks
- Smyley Island (72°55′S 78°0′W)
- Snodgrass Island
- Snow Hill Island (64°28′S 57°12′W))
- Snubbin Island
- Soatris Island (64°02′00″S 62°34′23″W)
- Soldat Island (68°31′S 78°11′E)
- Solitario Island
- Solstreif Island (64°33′S 62°0′W)
- Sorge Island
- Sostrene Islands
- Sotomayor Island (63°20′S 57°55′W)
- South Orkney Islands (60°35′S 45°30′W) (claimed by Argentina/Chile/United Kingdom)
  - Acuña Island (60°46′S 44°37′W)
  - Coronation Island (60°35′26″S 45°37′30″W)
  - Gosling Islands
  - Larsen Islands (60°36′S 46°04′W)
  - Laurie Island 60°43′43″S 44°31′05″W)
  - Inaccessible Islands (60°34′S 46°44′W)
  - Powell Island 60.683°S 45.033°W
  - Robertson Islands or Robertsons Islands (60°46′S 45°09′W)
  - Shagnasty Island
  - Signy Island 60°43′S 45°36′W
- South Shetland Islands (62°00′S 58°00′W) (claimed by Argentina/Chile/United Kingdom)
  - Bridgeman Island (minor) (62°04′S 56°44′W)
  - Clarence Island (61°12′S 54°05′W)
  - Cornwallis Island (61°04′S 54°28′W) (minor)
  - Deception Island (62°57′S 60°36′W)
  - Elephant Island (61°01′S 54°54′W)
  - Gibbs Island (61°28′S 55°34′W)
  - Greenwich Island (62°31′S 59°47′W)
  - Half Moon Island (minor)
  - King George Island or Île du Roi Georges or Isla 25 de Mayo or Isla Rey George or Isla Veinticinco de Mayo or King George's Island or König Georg Insel or Waterloo Island (the largest of the South Shetland Islands) (62°02′S 58°21′W)
  - Livingston Island (62°36′S 60°30′W)
  - Low Island (63°17′S 62°09′W)
  - Nelson Island (62°18′S 59°03′W)
  - Penguin Island (62°06′S 57°54′W) (minor – one of several "Penguin" Islands in the Antarctic region)
  - Robert Island (62°24′S 59°30′W)
  - Rowett Island (61°17′S 55°13′W) (minor)
  - Rugged Island (62°38′S 61°15′W) (minor – one of several so named in the Antarctic region)
  - Seal Island (60°58′S 55°24′W)
  - Smith Island (63°00′S 62°30′W)
  - Snow Island (62°47′S 61°23′W)
- Spaatz Island (73°00′S 75°00′W)
- Spano Island (66°24′S 110°36′E)
- Spatnik Island
- Spayd Island (70°33′S 72°7′E)
- Spert Island
- Sphinx Island (65°54′S 64°53′W)
- Split Rock (64°47′S 64°03′W)
- Sprey Island
- Sprightly Island (64°17′S 61°04′W)
- Spume Island (64°48′S 64°07′W)
- Square End Island
- Stanley Island
- Stedet Island
- Stego Island
- Stein Islands
- Steinemann Island (66°52′S 67°55′W)
- Stephen Island 75°50′S 146°54′W
- Stepping Stones (64°47′S 64°00′W)
- Sterna Island
- Sterrett Islands (73°48′S 103°23′W)
- Stevens Rock
- Stevenson Island
- Steventon Island 77°15′S 148°15′W
- Steele Island (71°0′S 60°40′W)
- Steinemann Island
- Stillwell Island
- Stipple Rocks
- Stoker Island
- Stoltz Island (69°15′S 72°9′W)
- Stonington Island (68°11′S 67°00′W)
- Suchland Islands (74°6′S 102°32′W)
- Sugarloaf Island
- Suhache Rock
- Surge Rocks (64°47′S 64°04′W)
- Suter Island
- Svenner Islands (69°2′S 76°50′E)
- Svetulka Island
- Svip Rocks
- Swain Islands
  - Berkley Island
  - Bradford Rock
  - Burnett Island
  - Cameron Island
  - Daniel Island
  - Hailstorm Island
  - Honkala Island
  - Wonsey Rock
  - Wyche Island
- Symington Islands
- Systerflesene Group

=== T ===
- Table Island
- Tadpole Island
- Tail Island
- Tambra Island
- Taralezh Island
- Tartar Island
- Tatul Island
- Tau Islands (64°18′S 62°55′W)
- Taylor Islands (66°10′S 100°17′E)
- Te Islands
- Teall Island (79°3′S 161°54′E)
- Teigan Island (66°27′S 110°36′E)
- Teksla Island (67°27′S 60°56′E)
- Temenuga Island
- Tenorio Rock
- Tent Island
- Terra Firma Islands
- Tetrad Islands (63°55′S 60°44′W)
- Teyssier Island
- Thala Island (70°37′S 166°5′E)
- The Pointers
- Thiebault Island (65°11′S 64°11′W)
- Thil Island
- Thomas Island (66°7′S 100°57′E)
- Thompson Island (66°0′S 110°7′E)
- Thomsen Islands (65°47′S 66°16′W)
- Thor Island
- Thorfinn Islands
- Thorgaut Island
- Thurston Island (72°06′S 99°00′W)
- Tiber Rocks (68°23′S 67°0′W)
- Tigan Island
- Tillett Islands (67°11′S 59°27′E)
- Tirizis Island
- Tokarev Island (66°32′S 92°59′E)
- Toledo Island
- Tonagh Island (67°6′S 50°18′E)
- Tongue Rock (67°33′S 62°0′E)
- Tongue Rocks (63°38′S 57°21′W)
- Tonkin Island (67°49′S 65°3′W)
- Topografov Island
- Torckler Rocks
- Torgersen Island (64°46′S 64°05′W)
- Tot Island (65°31′S 64°20′W)
- Tower Island (63°33′S 59°51′W)
- Transverse Island
- Trebishte Island
- Treklyano Island
- Trepassey Island
- Trevillian Island
- Triad Islands
- Trice Islands
- Trigonia Island
- Trigwell Island
- Trilling Islands
- Trinity Island (63°45′S 60°44′W)
- Triple Islands
- Tripod Island
- Tristan Island
- Trivelpiece Island (64°44′S 64°9′W)
- Trivial Islands
- Trowbridge Island
- Trump Islands
- Trundle Island
- Trundy Island
- Tryne Islands
- Tsankov Island
- Tsiolkovskiy Island
- Tukey Island (64°46′S 64°26′W)
- Tupinier Islands
- Tupman Island
- Turnabout Island
- Turner Island
- Tvarditsa Rocks
- Twig Rock
- Two Hummock Island
- Two Summit Island
- Tyulen Island

=== U ===
- Ufs Island
- Umber Island (69°13′S 72°0′W)
- Ungane Islands
- Unneruskollen Island
- Upper Island
- Useful Island
- Utholmen Island

=== V ===
- Vagrant Island (66°28′S 66°28′W)
- Valchedram Island
- Van Rocks
- Van Hulssen Islands
  - Van Hulssen Island
- Vardim Rocks
- Vaugondy Island
- Vega Island
- Verblyud Island
- Verte Island (66°44′S 141°11′E)
- Vetrilo Rocks
- Vicars Island
- Vidal Rock
- Vieugué Island
- Vilare Island
- Vize Islands
- Vkhodnoy Island (66°32′S 92°58′E)
- Vollmer Island
- Voluyak Rocks
- Vortex Island
- Vromos Island

=== W ===
- Wager Island (47°43′S 74°58′W)
- Waite Islands
- Wakadori Island
- Waratah Islands
- Ward Islands
- Warnock Islands
- Warren Island
- Warriner Island
- Wattle Island
- Webb Island
- Webber Island
- Weertman Island
- Welch Island (67°34′S 62°56′E)
- Welch Rocks
- Weller Island
- White Island (Enderby Land)
- White Island (Ross Archipelago)
- White Islands
- Wiencke Island (64°54′S 63°43′W)
- Wigg Islands
- Wilhelm Archipelago (65°8′S 64°20′W)
  - Anagram Islands
  - Argentine Islands
    - Channel Rock
  - Barbière Island (65°11′S 64°10′W)
  - The Barchans
  - Bazzano Island
  - Betbeder Islands
  - Black Island (Wilhelm Archipelago)
  - Booth Island (65°05′S 64°00′W)
  - Boudet Island
  - Bradley Rock (65°1′S 64°42′W)
  - Brown Island
  - The Buttons
  - Charlat Island
  - Cholet Island
  - Cruls Islands
  - Dannebrog Islands
  - Detour Island
  - Fanfare Island
  - Final Island
  - Flank Island
  - Forge Islands
  - Friar Island
  - Galindez Island
  - Grotto Island
  - Guido Island
  - Host Island
  - Hovgaard Island (65°8′S 64°8′W)
  - Indicator Island
  - Irizar Island
  - Knight Island
  - Leopard Island (65°15′S 64°18′W)
  - Lisboa Island
  - Lobel Island
  - Locator Island
  - Manciple Island
  - Maranga Island (65°12′S 64°22′W)
  - Mazzeo Island
  - Myriad Islands
  - Nob Island
  - Pléneau Island
  - Prevot Island
  - Prioress Island
  - Quintana Island
  - Rallier Island
  - Reeve Island
  - Roca Islands
  - Shelter Islands
  - Sinclair Island (64°55′S 63°53′W)
  - Skua Island
  - Smooth Island
  - Sögen Island (65°4′S 64°2′W)
  - Somerville Island
  - Splitwind Island (65°2′S 63°56′W)
  - Squire Island (64°55′S 63°54′W)
  - Stray Islands
  - Thiébault Island
  - Three Little Pigs (65°14′S 64°17′W)
  - Uruguay Island
  - Vedel Islands
  - Wauwermans Islands
  - Wednesday Island (64°56′S 63°45′W)
  - Winter Island (65°14′58″S 64°15′35″W)
- Williams Rocks (67°26′S 62°46′E)
- Wiltshire Rocks
- Windmill Islands (66°20′S 110°28′E)
  - Allison Islands (66°21′S 110°29′E)
  - Ardery Island (66°22′S 110°27′E)
  - Austral Island (66°30′S 110°39′E)
  - Bailey Rocks (66°17′S 110°32′E)
  - Beall Island (66°18′S 110°29′E)
  - Birkenhauer Island (66°29′S 110°37′E)
  - Boffa Island (66°28′S 110°37′E)
  - Borrello Island (66°19′S 110°22′E)
  - Bosner Island (66°27′S 110°36′E)
  - Bousquet Island (66°25′S 110°41′E)
  - Boving Island (66°17′S 110°31′E)
  - Cloyd Island (66°25′S 110°33′E)
  - Cronk Islands (66°19′S 110°25′E)
  - Denison Island (66°18′S 110°27′E)
  - Fitzpatrick Rock (66°16′S 110°30′E)
  - Ford Island (66°24′S 110°31′E)
  - Gibney Reef (66°15′S 110°30′E)
  - Griffith Island (66°20′S 110°29′E)
  - Hemphill Island (66°23′S 110°34′E)
  - Herring Island (66°24′S 110°38′E)
  - Holl Island (66°25′S 110°25′E)
  - Hollin Island (66°19′S 110°24′E)
  - Kilby Island (66°16′S 110°31′E)
  - McIntyre Island (66°14′S 110°34′E)
  - Odbert Island (66°22′S 110°33′E)
  - Peterson Island (66°28′S 110°30′E)
  - Pidgeon Island (66°19′S 110°27′E)
  - Sack Island (66°26′S 110°25′E)
  - Shirley Island (66°17′S 110°30′E)
  - Smith Islands (66°18′S 110°27′E)
- Window Island (62°33′55.5″S 61°07′25.3″W)
- Winkle Island
- Withem Island
- Wittmann Island
- Wollan Island
- Wollesen Islands
- Wombat Island
- Wonsey Rock
- Wood Island
- Woogie Island (64°49′25″S 63°29′55″W)
- Woolpack Island
- Wright Island 74°2′S 116°50′W
- Wyatt Island
- Wyatt Earp Islands
- Wyche Island
- Wyck Island

=== Y ===
- Yalour Islands
- Yastreb Island
- Yato Rocks
- Yoke Island
- Yordanov Island
- Yseult Island
- Ytrehovdeholmen Island

=== Z ===
- Zavadovskiy Island
- Zavala Island
- Zebil Island
- Zed Islands
- Zherav Island
- Zigzag Island
- Zikoniya Island
- Zukriegel Island
- Zverino Island

== Sub-lists ==
- New Zealand Subantarctic Islands

== See also ==
- Antarctic
- Falkland Islands
  - List of islands of the Falkland Islands
- Lists of islands
  - List of islands in the Arctic Ocean
  - List of islands in the Atlantic Ocean
  - List of islands in the Indian Ocean
  - List of islands in the Pacific Ocean
- Subantarctic
- Tierra del Fuego
  - Hermite Islands
