= Guano Island (Antarctica) =

Island in Adélie Land, Antarctica

- Location within Antarctica

Geography
- Location: Antarctica
- Coordinates: 66°46′S 141°36′E

Administration
- Administered under the Antarctic Treaty System

Demographics
- Population: Uninhabited

Guano Island is a rocky island 0.4 kilometres (0.2 nmi) long, lying 0.4 kilometres (0.2 nmi) south of Chameau Island at the southeast end of the Curzon Islands, Antarctica. It was charted and named by the French Antarctic Expedition in 1951. The name derives from the considerable deposits of penguin guano there.

== See also ==
- List of Antarctic and sub-Antarctic islands
