= Pfaff Island =

Island in Graham Land, Antarctica

- Location within Antarctica

Geography
- Location: Antarctica
- Coordinates: 66°54′S 67°44′W

Administration
- Administered under the Antarctic Treaty System

Demographics
- Population: Uninhabited

Pfaff Island is one of the Bennett Islands, lying just south of Granicher Island in Hanusse Bay. Mapped from air photos taken by Ronne Antarctic Research Expedition (RARE) (1947–48) and Falkland Islands and Dependencies Aerial Survey Expedition (FIDASE) (1956–57). Named by United Kingdom Antarctic Place-Names Committee (UK-APC) for Alexius B.I.F. Pfaff (1825–86), German physicist who made pioneer investigations of the plastic deformation of ice, in Switzerland, in 1874–76.

== See also ==
- List of Antarctic and sub-Antarctic islands
