= Bielecki Island =

Island in Palmer Archipelago, Antarctica

- Location within Antarctica

Geography
- Location: Antarctica
- Coordinates: 64°46′S 64°29′W

Administration
- Administered under the Antarctic Treaty System

Demographics
- Population: Uninhabited

Bielecki Island (64°46′S 64°29′W) is an island 1 kilometre (0.5 nmi) north of Trundy Island in the western part of the Joubin Islands. It was named by the Advisory Committee on Antarctic Names after Johannes N. Bielecki, an assistant engineer in RV Hero on her first Antarctic voyage to Palmer Station in 1968.

== See also ==
- List of Antarctic and sub-Antarctic islands
