= Boree Islands =

Islands in Enderby Land, Antarctica

- Location within Antarctica

Geography
- Location: Antarctica
- Coordinates: 67°41′S 45°20′E

Administration
- Administered under the Antarctic Treaty System

Demographics
- Population: Uninhabited

The Boree Islands (67°41′S 45°20′E) are two small islands 4 kilometres (2 nmi) west of Point Widdows, Enderby Land. They were plotted from air photos taken from Australian National Antarctic Research Expeditions aircraft in 1956, and named by the Antarctic Names Committee of Australia after "boree", a vernacular name for some species of acacia found in Australia.

== See also ==
- List of Antarctic and sub-Antarctic islands
