= Knight Rocks =

Rocky islets in the South Shetland Islands

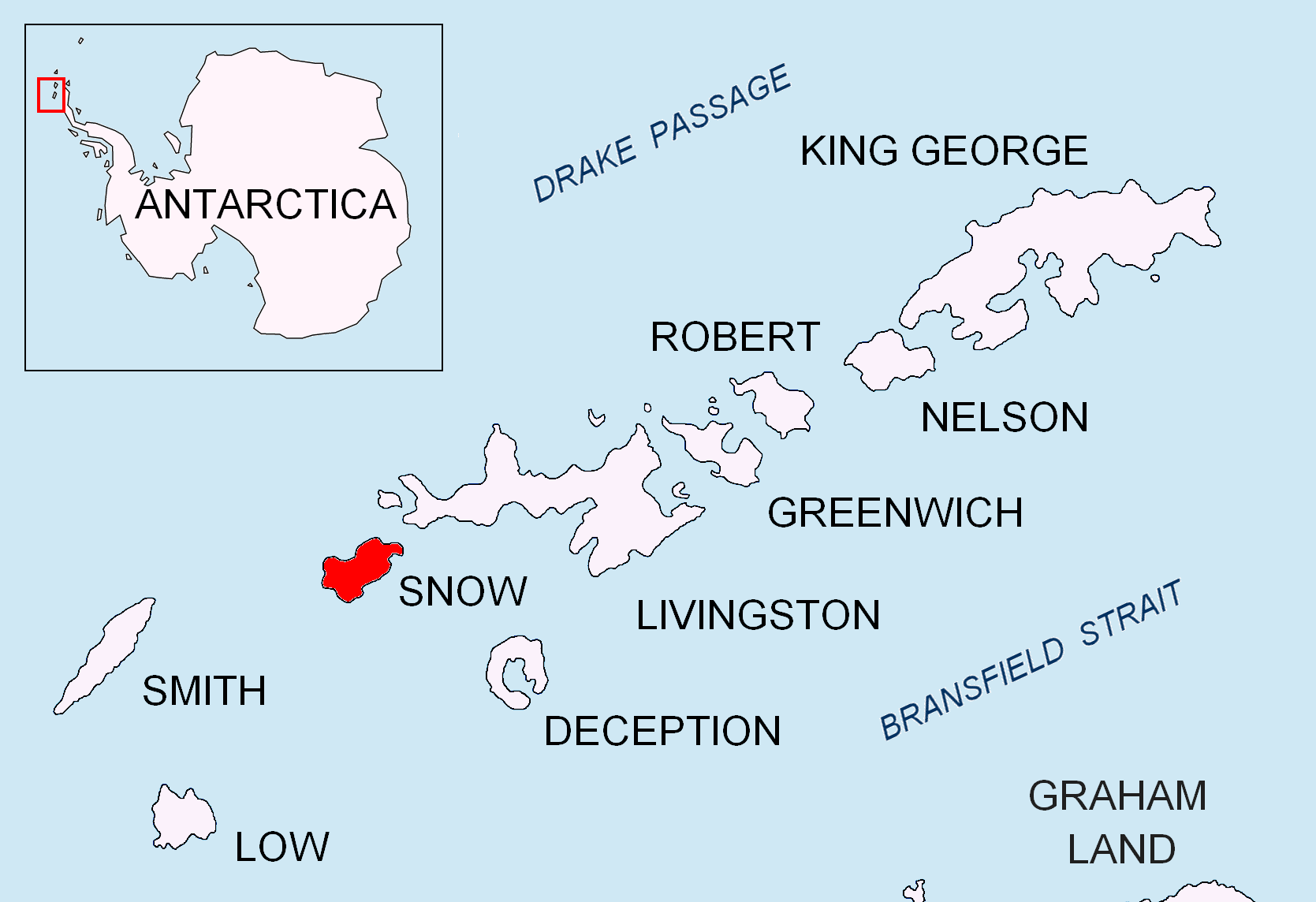
- Location of Snow Island in the South Shetland Islands

- Location within Antarctic Peninsula Location within Antarctica

Geography
- Location: Antarctica
- Coordinates: 62°50′S 61°35′W

Administration
- Administered under the Antarctic Treaty System

Demographics
- Population: Uninhabited

The Knight Rocks are a group of small rocks which lie 8 kilometres (4.5 nmi) west-northwest of the south end of Snow Island, in the South Shetland Islands. The rocks were so named by the UK Antarctic Place-Names Committee following a survey by Lieutenant Commander F.W. Hunt, Royal Navy, in 1951–52, because of their proximity to Castle Rock.

== See also ==
- List of Antarctic and subantarctic islands
