= Pingvin =

Pingvin means "penguin" in several languages. It may refer to:

- Pingvin Rocks, Antarctica
- Pingvin Island, Antarctica
- Pingvin exercise suit, Russian anti-zero-G suit
- Pingvin RC, Swedish rugby club in Trelleborg
- Pingvin, the name of Finnish gunboat Hämeenmaa when it was in Russian service
