= Krok Island =

Island in Antarctica

- Location within Antarctica

Geography
- Location: Antarctica
- Coordinates: 67°2′S 57°46′E

Administration
- Administered under the Antarctic Treaty System

Demographics
- Population: Uninhabited

Krok Island is an irregular-shaped island nearly 1.9 kilometres (1 nmi) in extent, the largest of the group lying 1.9 kilometres (1 nmi) south of Abrupt Island and 11 kilometres (6 nmi) west of Hoseason Glacier, Antarctica. It was mapped by Norwegian cartographers from aerial photos taken by the Lars Christensen Expedition, 1936–37, and named "Krokoy" (crooked island).

== See also ==
- List of Antarctic and sub-Antarctic islands
