= Ommundsen Island =

Island in Antarctica

- Location within Antarctica

Geography
- Location: Antarctica
- Coordinates: 66°20′S 110°22′E

Administration
- Administered under the Antarctic Treaty System

Demographics
- Population: Uninhabited

Ommundsen Island is an island just west of Midgley Island in the Windmill Islands. First mapped from air photos taken by U.S. Navy Operation Highjump, 1946–47. Named by Advisory Committee on Antarctic Names (US-ACAN) for Audon Ommundsen, transport specialist at Wilkes Station in 1958.

== See also ==
- List of antarctic and sub-antarctic islands
