= Goetschy Island =

Island near the middle of Peltier Channel in the Palmer Archipelago, Antarctica

- Location within Antarctica

Geography
- Location: Antarctica
- Coordinates: 64°52′S 63°31′W

Administration
- Administered under the Antarctic Treaty System

Demographics
- Population: Uninhabited

Goetschy Island is a low rocky island lying near the middle of Peltier Channel in the Palmer Archipelago, Antarctica. It was first charted and named by the French Antarctic Expedition, 1903–05, under Jean-Baptiste Charcot.

== See also ==
- List of Antarctic and sub-Antarctic islands
