= Bazett Island =

Coordinates: 66°18′S 67°6′W

Bazett Island is a small island close south of the west end of Krogh Island, in the Biscoe Islands. It was mapped from air photos by the Falkland Islands and Dependencies Aerial Survey Expedition (1956–57), and named by the UK Antarctic Place-Names Committee for Henry C. Bazett (1885–1950), American physiologist, pioneer of studies of temperature sensation and the physiology of temperature regulation of the human body.

== See also ==
- List of Antarctic and sub-Antarctic islands
