= Håkollen Island =

Island in Antarctica

- Location within Antarctica

Geography
- Location: Antarctica
- Coordinates: 67°0′S 57°15′E
- Highest elevation: 100 m (300 ft)

Administration
- Administered under the Antarctic Treaty System

Demographics
- Population: Uninhabited

Håkollen Island is an island 2 kilometres (1 nmi) long, rising to 100 metres (330 ft), lying in the southwest part of the Øygarden Group, Antarctica. It was mapped by Norwegian cartographers from aerial photos taken by the Lars Christensen Expedition, 1936–37, and called Håkollen (the shark knoll).

== See also ==
- List of Antarctic and sub-Antarctic islands
