= Spayd Island =

Island in Antarctica

Spayd Island (70°33′S 72°7′E) is an ice-covered island with prominent rock exposures 2 nautical miles (3.7 km) long, lying at the southeast side of Gillock Island on the east margin of Amery Ice Shelf Delineated in 1952 by John H. Roscoe from aerial photographs taken by U.S. Navy Operation Highjump, 1946–47, and named by him for A.W. Spayd, air crewman on Operation Highjump photographic flights in this and other coastal areas between 14 and 164 East longitude.

== See also ==
- List of Antarctic and sub-Antarctic islands
