= Split Rock, Antarctica =

Distinctive rock off the coast of Anvers Island

Split Rock
- Rock
- Location within Antarctic Peninsula
- Coordinates: 64°47′S 64°3′W
- Location: Anvers Island, Palmer Archipelago
- Etymology: Descriptive name

Split Rock (64°47′S 64°3′W) is a distinctive oval-shaped rock, cleanly split in a north–south direction to the water line, lying 0.1 nautical miles (0.19 km) northwest of Janus Island, off the southwest coast of Anvers Island. The descriptive name was given by Palmer Station personnel in 1972.

== See also ==
- List of Antarctic and sub-Antarctic islands
