= Curtis Island (Antarctica) =

Island off the west coast of Graham Land

Curtis Island (65°56′S 65°38′W) is an island over 1 nautical mile (1.9 km) long, lying 2 nautical miles (3.7 km) northeast of Jagged Island, off the west coast of Graham Land. First accurately shown on an Argentine government chart of 1957. Named by the United Kingdom Antarctic Place-Names Committee (UK-APC) in 1959 for Robin Curtis, Falkland Islands Dependencies Survey (FIDS) geologist at Prospect Point in 1957, who was attached to the British Naval Hydrographic Survey Unit in the area, 1957-58.

== See also ==
- List of antarctic and sub-antarctic islands
