= DeAtley Island =

Island in Palmer Land, Antarctica

- Location within Antarctica

Geography
- Location: Antarctica
- Coordinates: 73°18′S 73°54′W

Administration
- Administered under the Antarctic Treaty System

Demographics
- Population: Uninhabited

DeAtley Island is a large, ice-covered island lying 19 kilometres (12 mi) east of Spaatz Island at the south side of the Ronne Entrance. The island was sighted and roughly mapped by air during the RARE (Note: Ronne Antarctic Research Expedition) (1947–48). Finn Ronne later named the island after Colonel Ellsworth DeAtley, United States Army, and his wife Thelma DeAtley, who both contributed clothing and food in support of RARE.

== See also ==
- List of Antarctic and sub-Antarctic islands
