= Marégraphe Island =

Island in Adélie Land, Antarctica

- Location within Antarctica

Geography
- Location: Antarctica
- Coordinates: 66°40′S 140°0′E
- Archipelago: Géologie Archipelago

Administration
- Administered under the Antarctic Treaty System

Demographics
- Population: Uninhabited

Marégraphe Island is a small rocky island 100 meters west of the north end of Carrel Island in the Géologie Archipelago, Antarctica. It was charted in 1951 by the French Antarctic Expedition and so named by them because a recording tide gauge, or marigraph (in French "marégraphe"), was placed on the island and obtained data during 1951 and 1952.

== See also ==
- List of Antarctic and sub-Antarctic islands
