= Vincent Islands =

Islands in King Haakon Bay, South Georgia Island

- Location within Antarctica
- Etymology: J. Vincent, boatswain of the Endurance

Geography
- Location: King Haakon Bay, South Georgia Island
- Coordinates: 54°9′S 37°16′W

Vincent Islands (54°9′S 37°16′W) is a small group of islands at the head of King Haakon Bay on the south side of South Georgia. Roughly charted by the British expedition under Shackleton, 1914–16, and surveyed by the SGS in the period 1951–57. Named by the United Kingdom Antarctic Place-Names Committee (UK-APC) for J. Vincent, boatswain of the Endurance, 1914–16, who accompanied Shackleton in the James Caird from Elephant Island to King Haakon Bay.

== See also ==
- List of Antarctic and sub-Antarctic islands
