= Curie Island =

Island in Adélie Land, Antarctica

- Location within Antarctica

Geography
- Location: Antarctica
- Coordinates: 66°39′S 140°3′E
- Archipelago: Géologie Archipelago

Administration
- Administered under the Antarctic Treaty System

Demographics
- Population: Uninhabited

Curie Island is a small rocky island near the eastern end of the Géologie Archipelago, lying 2 kilometres (1 nmi) southwest of Derby Island, close north of Astrolabe Glacier Tongue. It was photographed from the air by U.S. Navy Operation Highjump, 1946–47. It was charted by the French Antarctic Expedition, 1949–51, and named by them for the noted French family of physicists and chemists: Pierre Curie and Marie Curie.

== See also ==
- List of Antarctic and sub-Antarctic islands
