= Andresen Island =

Island in Graham Land, Antarctica

- Location within Antarctica Location within Antarctic Peninsula

Geography
- Location: Antarctica
- Coordinates: 66°53′S 66°40′W

Administration
- Administered under the Antarctic Treaty System

Demographics
- Population: Uninhabited

Andresen Island, also known as "Isla Curanilahue", is an island 4 kilometres (2 nmi) long and rising over 610 metres (2,000 ft), lying in the middle of the entrance to Lallemand Fjord, off the west coast of Graham Land. It was discovered by the French Antarctic Expedition, 1908–10, under Jean-Baptiste Charcot, and named by him for the manager of the Magellan Whaling Co at the company's Deception Island base, who provided coal for the expedition.

== See also ==
- List of Antarctic and subantarctic islands
