= Riddle Islands =

Riddle Islands (65°39′S 64°33′W) is a small group of islands lying off the southwest end of Chavez Island, off the west coast of Graham Land. First charted by the British Graham Land Expedition (BGLE) under Rymill, 1934–37. The name arose locally in August 1957 because these islands were difficult to find among the icebergs frozen in the surrounding sea ice.

== See also ==
- List of Antarctic and sub-Antarctic islands
