= Vestfold Island =

Island in South Georgia

- Location within Antarctica
- Etymology: A/S Vestfold, a whaling firm that operated the whaling ship Vestfold

Geography
- Location: Larvik Harbour, South Georgia Island
- Coordinates: 54°22′S 36°55′W

Vestfold Island (54°22′S 36°55′W) is a small island offshore, forming the northwest entrance point to Larvik, a bay on the south coast of South Georgia. It was named by the United Kingdom Antarctic Place-Names Committee (UK-APC) in 1982, after the whaling firm A/S Vestfold, which operated the whaling ship Vestfold and a shore whaling station at the head of Stromness Harbor, from about 1920.

== See also ==
- List of Antarctic and sub-Antarctic islands
