= Paul Islands =

Island group in Palmer Archipelago, Antarctica

- Location within Antarctica

Geography
- Location: Antarctica
- Coordinates: 64°16′S 63°44′W

Administration
- Administered under the Antarctic Treaty System

Demographics
- Population: Uninhabited

Paul Islands is a group of islands 5.6 kilometres (3 nmi) in extent, lying northwest of Quinton Point off the northwest coast of Anvers Island, in the Palmer Archipelago.

== History ==
Discovered and named by the German expedition under Dallmann, 1873–74.

== See also ==
- List of Antarctic and sub-Antarctic islands
