= Numbat Island =

Island in Enderby Land, Antarctica

- Location within Antarctica

Geography
- Location: Antarctica
- Coordinates: 67°34′S 47°58′E

Administration
- Administered under the Antarctic Treaty System

Demographics
- Population: Uninhabited

Numbat Island is a small island just east of Pinn Island, off the coast of Enderby Land. Plotted from air photos taken from ANARE (Australian National Antarctic Research Expeditions) aircraft in 1956. Named by Antarctic Names Committee of Australia (ANCA) after the numbat (banded anteater), a native animal of Australia.

== See also ==
- List of Antarctic and sub-Antarctic islands
