= Jagar Islands =

Group of islands in Antarctica

- Location within Antarctica

Geography
- Location: Antarctica
- Coordinates: 66°35′S 57°20′E

Administration
- Administered under the Antarctic Treaty System

Demographics
- Population: Uninhabited

The Jagar Islands are a group of small islands lying immediately off Cape Boothby, Enderby Land, Antarctica. They were mapped by Norwegian cartographers from air photos taken by the Lars Christensen Expedition, 1936–37, and named "Jagarane" (the hunters). The form Jagar Islands, recommended by the Antarctic Names Committee of Australia, has been adopted.

== See also ==
- List of antarctic and sub-antarctic islands
