= Sack Island =

Island in Antarctica

- Location within Antarctica

Geography
- Location: Antarctica
- Coordinates: 66°26′S 110°25′E
- Archipelago: Windmill Islands

Administration
- Administered under the Antarctic Treaty System

Demographics
- Population: Uninhabited

Sack Island is a rocky island, 0.7 kilometres (0.4 nmi) long, lying 0.4 kilometres (0.2 nmi) east of the south end of Holl Island, in the Windmill Islands. First mapped from aerial photographs taken by U.S. Navy Operation Highjump in February 1947. Named by the Advisory Committee on Antarctic Names (US-ACAN) for Norman F. Sack who served as photographer's mate with the central task force of U.S. Navy Operation Highjump, 1946–47, and assisted Operation Windmill parties in obtaining photographic coverage of this area in January 1948.

== See also ==
- List of antarctic and sub-antarctic islands
