= Trivelpiece Island =

Island in Palmer Archipelago, Antarctica

Trivelpiece Island (64°44′S 64°9′W) is an island in Wylie Bay, located northeast of Halfway Island. Named for Wayne Z. Trivelpiece and Susan Green Trivelpiece, who studied seabird ecology in the Antarctic Peninsula area for over twenty years. In the 1980s and 90s, the Trivelpieces identified a rapid decline in Adelie penguin populations, and in collaboration with their colleague ecologist William Fraser, proposed the idea that increasing sea temperatures and melting sea ice were negatively affecting penguin populations along the Antarctic Peninsula. In 2011 they identified shifts in the abundance of Antarctic krill, a primary food of both Adelie and Chinstrap penguins, due to climate warming and sea ice declines as a primary cause for the observed population crashes.

== See also ==
- List of Antarctic and sub-Antarctic islands
