= Zigzag Island =

Island in Palmer Archipelago, Antarctica

- Map of Palmer Archipelago, showing Tower Island

- Location in Antarctica Zigzag Island (Antarctica)

Geography
- Location: Antarctica
- Coordinates: 63°36′S 59°52′W
- Archipelago: Palmer Archipelago

Administration
- Administered under the Antarctic Treaty System

Demographics
- Population: Uninhabited

Zigzag Island is a small island close off the south coast of Tower Island, Palmer Archipelago. The name applied by United Kingdom Antarctic Place-Names Committee (UK-APC) is descriptive of the island in plan; it is deeply indented, with steep cliff faces.

== See also ==
- Composite Antarctic Gazetteer
- List of Antarctic and sub-Antarctic islands
- List of Antarctic islands south of 60° S
- SCAR
- Territorial claims in Antarctica

== Map ==
- Trinity Peninsula. Scale 1:250000 topographic map No. 5697. Institut für Angewandte Geodäsie and British Antarctic Survey, 1996.
