= Palosuo Islands =

Island group in Antarctica

- Location within Antarctica

Geography
- Location: Antarctica
- Coordinates: 65°37′S 66°5′W

Administration
- Administered under the Antarctic Treaty System

Demographics
- Population: Uninhabited

Palosuo Islands is a group of small islands and rocks lying 2.8 kilometres (1.5 nmi) north of Maurstad Point, off the west side of Renaud Island in the Biscoe Islands. First accurately shown on an Argentine government chart of 1957. Named by the United Kingdom Antarctic Place-Names Committee (UK-APC) in 1959 for Erkki Palosuo, Finnish oceanographer who has specialized in sea ice studies.

== See also ==
- List of Antarctic and sub-Antarctic islands
