= Steinemann Island =

Island in Antarctica

Steinemann Island (66°52′S 67°55′W) is an island off the northeast coast of Adelaide Island, about 10 nautical miles (18 km) southwest of Mount Velain. Mapped from air photos taken by Ronne Antarctic Research Expedition (RARE) (1947–48) and Falkland Islands and Dependencies Aerial Survey Expedition (FIDASE) (1956–57). Named by United Kingdom Antarctic Place-Names Committee (UK-APC) for Samuel Steinemann, Swiss physicist who has made laboratory investigations on the flow of single and polycrystalline ice.

== See also ==
- List of Antarctic and sub-Antarctic islands
