= Embassy Islands =

Pair of islands in Antarctica

- Location within Antarctica

Geography
- Location: Antarctica
- Coordinates: 67°53′S 68°45′W

Administration
- Administered under the Antarctic Treaty System

Demographics
- Population: Uninhabited

The Embassy Islands are two small islands, the westernmost of the Dion Islands, lying 13 kilometres (7 nmi) south of Adelaide Island. The Dion Islands were first sighted and roughly charted in 1909 by the French Antarctic Expedition under Jean-Baptiste Charcot. This feature was surveyed in 1949 by the Falkland Islands Dependencies Survey and named "Embassy Rock" by the UK Antarctic Place-Names Committee because of its detached position in association with Emperor Island. In 1963 the British Royal Navy Hydrographic Survey Unit found there were two islands, not one as previously supposed.

== See also ==
- List of Antarctic and sub-Antarctic islands
