= Bousquet Island =

Island in Antarctica

- Location within Antarctica

Geography
- Location: Antarctica
- Coordinates: 66°25′S 110°41′E
- Archipelago: Windmill Islands
- Length: 0.6 km (0.37 mi)

Administration
- Administered under the Antarctic Treaty System

Demographics
- Population: Uninhabited

Bousquet Island, 0.6 kilometres (0.3 nmi) long, lies immediately east of Herring Island in the Windmill Islands, Antarctica. It was first mapped from air photos taken by USN Operation Highjump in 1946 and 1947. Named by C. R. Eklund, station scientific leader, for Utilities Man 2nd Class Edward A. Bousquet, USN, a Navy Support force member of the 1957 wintering party at Wilkes Station during the International Geophysical Year (IGY).

Bousquet Island lies 17 km (11 mi) south-south-east of Casey Station, operated year-round by the Australian Government Antarctic Division in Hobart, Tasmania. Sometimes also known as Little Herring Island, the site is well known to Casey expeditioners for its population of breeding Weddell Seals which pup on the sea ice in the immediate vicinity of the island.

== See also ==
- Composite Antarctic Gazetteer
- List of Antarctic and sub-Antarctic islands
- List of Antarctic islands south of 60° S
- SCAR
- Territorial claims in Antarctica
