= Garde Islands =

Island group in Antarctica

The Garde Islands (65°51′S 66°22′W) are a small group of islands lying 5 nautical miles (9 km) west-northwest of Lively Point, off the southwest side of Renaud Island in the Biscoe Islands. They were first accurately shown on an Argentine government chart of 1957, and were named by the UK Antarctic Place-Names Committee in 1959 for Vilhelm Garde, a Danish oceanographer who in 1899 initiated the international scheme of sea ice reporting in the Arctic.

== See also ==
- List of Antarctic and sub-Antarctic islands
