= Hodgeman Islands =

Islands in George V land in the Antarctic

- Location within Antarctica

Geography
- Location: Antarctica
- Coordinates: 67°1′S 144°14′E

Administration
- Administered under the Antarctic Treaty System

Demographics
- Population: Uninhabited

The Hodgeman Islands are a group of small islands lying close to the coast of Antarctica, 7 kilometres (4 nmi) west-southwest of Cape De la Motte, in the eastern part of the entrance to Watt Bay. They were discovered by the Australasian Antarctic Expedition (1911–14) under Douglas Mawson, who named the islands for Alfred Hodgeman, a cartographer and assistant meteorologist with the expedition.

== See also ==
- List of Antarctic and sub-Antarctic islands
