= Francis Island =

Island in Graham Land, Antarctica

- Location within Antarctica

Geography
- Location: Antarctica
- Coordinates: 67°37′S 64°45′W
- Length: 13 km (8.1 mi)
- Width: 9 km (5.6 mi)

Administration
- Administered under the Antarctic Treaty System

Demographics
- Population: Uninhabited

Francis Island is an island which is irregular in shape, 13 kilometres (7 nmi) long and 9 kilometres (5 nmi) wide, lying 22 kilometres (12 nmi) east-northeast of Choyce Point, off the east coast of Graham Land, Antarctica. It was discovered and photographed from the air by the United States Antarctic Service in 1940. It was charted in 1947 by the Falkland Islands Dependencies Survey (FIDS), who named it for S.J. Francis, a FIDS surveyor.

== See also ==
- List of Antarctic and sub-Antarctic islands
