= Nord Island =

Island in Adélie Land, Antarctica

- Location within Antarctica

Geography
- Location: Antarctica
- Coordinates: 66°45′S 141°33′E

Administration
- Administered under the Antarctic Treaty System

Demographics
- Population: Uninhabited

Nord Island is a small rocky island which is the northernmost feature in the Curzon Islands. It was charted in 1951 by the French Antarctic Expedition and named for its position in the island group, nord being French for north.

== See also ==
- List of Antarctic and sub-Antarctic islands
