= Chërnyy Island =

Island in Antarctica

- Location within Antarctica

Geography
- Location: Antarctica
- Coordinates: 66°8′S 101°4′E
- Archipelago: Highjump Archipelago

Administration
- Administered under the Antarctic Treaty System

Demographics
- Population: Uninhabited

Chërnyy Island is a small island lying 0.9 kilometres (0.5 nmi) south of the eastern tip of Thomas Island in the Highjump Archipelago. It was mapped from air photos taken by U.S. Navy Operation Highjump (1946–47). It was rephotographed by the Soviet expedition (1956) and named Ostrov Chërnyy (black island).

== See also ==
- List of antarctic and sub-antarctic islands
