= Piton Island =

Island in Adélie Land, Antarctica

- Location within Antarctica

Geography
- Location: Antarctica
- Coordinates: 66°47′S 141°36′E

Administration
- Administered under the Antarctic Treaty System

Demographics
- Population: Uninhabited

Piton Island is a small rocky island lying 0.19 kilometres (0.1 nmi) southwest of Guano Island in the Curzon Islands. Charted in 1951 by the French Antarctic Expedition and so named by them for its very pointed shape.

== See also ==
- List of Antarctic and sub-Antarctic islands
