= Mirage Island =

Island in Adélie Land, Antarctica

- Location within Antarctica

Geography
- Location: Antarctica
- Coordinates: 66°48′S 141°27′E

Administration
- Administered under the Antarctic Treaty System

Demographics
- Population: Uninhabited

Mirage Island is a rocky island 0.5 kilometres (0.25 nmi) long lying 0.6 kilometres (0.3 nmi) west of Cape Mousse on the coast of Antarctica. It was charted in 1950 by the French Antarctic Expedition and so named by them because mirages were frequently observed in the vicinity of the island.

== See also ==
- List of Antarctic and sub-Antarctic islands
