= Gnomon Island =

Island on Elephant island in Shetland Islands, United Kingdom

- South Shetland Islands

- Location within Antarctic Peninsula Location within Antarctica

Geography
- Location: Antarctica
- Coordinates: 61°5′S 54°52′W

Administration
- Administered under the Antarctic Treaty System

Demographics
- Population: Uninhabited

Gnomon Island is a small rocky island lying just north of Point Wild, on Elephant Island in the South Shetland Islands. It was charted by Ernest Shackleton's Endurance expedition, 1914–1916, and so named by them because when viewed from Point Wild the shape of the feature is suggestive of a gnomon, the elevated arm of a sundial.

== See also ==
- List of antarctic and sub-antarctic islands
