= Glinka Islands =

Island group in Palmer Land, Antarctica

- Location within Antarctica

Geography
- Location: Antarctica
- Coordinates: 69°23′S 72°17′W

Administration
- Administered under the Antarctic Treaty System

Demographics
- Population: Uninhabited

The Glinka Islands are a small group of rocky islands in Lazarev Bay, Antarctica, immediately east of Rothschild Island. They were first photographed from the air by the United States Antarctic Service, 1939–41, and were mapped from air photos taken by the Ronne Antarctic Research Expedition, 1947–48, by D. Searle of the Falkland Islands Dependencies Survey in 1960. They were named by the UK Antarctic Place-Names Committee for Mikhail Ivanovich Glinka, the Russian composer.

== See also ==
- List of Antarctic and sub-Antarctic islands
