= Solus Island =

Island in Antarctica

Coordinates: 67°52′S 68°26′W

Solus Island is an island off the Antarctic Peninsula, lying 3 nautical miles (6 km) south of the Guébriant Islands, to the south-southeast of Cape Alexandra at the south end of Adelaide Island. The name appears as Islote Solitario, meaning 'solitary islet', on an Argentine government chart of 1957. The name indicates its isolated position. The name 'Solus Island' was adopted on British charts

The island was charted by a Royal Navy Hydrographic Survey Unit from 'John Biscoe' in 1963.

== See also ==
- List of Antarctic and sub-Antarctic islands
