= Trigonia Island =

Trigonia Island (66°1′S 65°41′W) is a small island immediately off the south tip of Beer Island, lying 8 nautical miles (15 km) west of Prospect Point, off the west coast of Graham Land, Antarctica. It was charted and named by the British Graham Land Expedition (BGLE), 1934–37, under Rymill.

== See also ==
- List of Antarctic and sub-Antarctic islands
