= Gnome Island =

Island in Graham Land, Antarctica

- Location within Antarctica

Geography
- Location: Antarctica
- Coordinates: 67°33′S 66°50′W

Administration
- Administered under the Antarctic Treaty System

Demographics
- Population: Uninhabited

Gnome Island is a rocky island lying between the east end of Blaiklock Island and Thomson Head near the head of Bourgeois Fjord, off the west coast of Graham Land, Antarctica. It was first surveyed in 1949 by the Falkland Islands Dependencies Survey, and so named by them because of the resemblance of the island to a small gnomelike creature rising from the sea.

== See also ==
- List of Antarctic and sub-Antarctic islands
