= Endresen Islands =

Island group in Antarctica

- Location within Antarctica

Geography
- Location: Antarctica
- Coordinates: 67°17′S 60°0′E
- Highest elevation: 60 m (200 ft)

Administration
- Administered under the Antarctic Treaty System

Demographics
- Population: Uninhabited

The Endresen Islands are a group of small islands, the highest rising to 60 metres (200 ft), lying just north of the Hobbs Islands. They were discovered and named by Discovery Investigations personnel on the William Scoresby in February 1936.

== See also ==
- List of Antarctic and sub-Antarctic islands
