= Boxing Island =

Island in Graham Land, Antarctica

Boxing Island (64°35′S 61°41′W) is a small island lying in Charlotte Bay east of Harris Peak, off the west coast of Graham Land. It was first charted by the Belgian Antarctic Expedition under Gerlache, 1897–99, and so named by members of the Falkland Islands Dependencies Survey because they first saw it on Boxing Day 1956.

== See also ==
- List of Antarctic and sub-Antarctic islands
