= Triad Islands =

Group of islands in Antarctica

Triad Islands (65°36′S 64°28′W) is a group of three small islands lying 1.5 nautical miles (2.8 km) east of Chavez Island, off the west coast of Graham Land. First charted by the British Graham Land Expedition (BGLE) under Rymill, 1934–37. The name given by the United Kingdom Antarctic Place-Names Committee (UK-APC) in 1959 is descriptive.

== See also ==
- List of Antarctic and sub-Antarctic islands
