= Phelps Island, Antarctica =

Island of Antarctica

Phelps Island
- Location within Antarctica

Geography
- Location: Antarctica
- Coordinates: 66°17′S 110°30′E

Administration
- Administered under the Antarctic Treaty System

Demographics
- Population: Uninhabited

Phelps Island is a small island lying close west of the north end of Shirley Island, in the Windmill Islands, Antarctica. First mapped from air photos taken by U.S. Navy Operation Highjump and Operation Windmill in 1947 and 1948. Named by the Advisory Committee on Antarctic Names (US-ACAN) for Robert F. Phelps, air crewman with U.S. Navy Operation Windmill which established astronomical control stations in the area in January 1948.

== See also ==
- List of antarctic and sub-antarctic islands
