= Teigan Island =

Island in Antarctica

Teigan Island (66°27′S 110°36′E) is a rocky island, 0.2 nautical miles (0.4 km) long, lying 0.1 nautical miles (0.2 km) northeast of Bosner Island, near the south end of the Windmill Islands. First mapped from aerial photographs taken by U.S. Navy Operation Highjump in February 1947. Named by the Advisory Committee on Antarctic Names (US-ACAN) for B. Teigan, who served as air crewman with the central task group of U.S. Navy Operation Highjump, 1946–47, and also with U.S. Navy Operation Windmill which obtained aerial and ground photographic coverage of the Windmill Islands in January 1948.

== See also ==
- List of antarctic and sub-antarctic islands
