= Trivial Islands =

Trivial Islands (65°31′S 65°13′W) is a group of small Antarctic islands lying 1.5 nautical miles (2.8 km) east of Lacuna Island and 7 nautical miles (13 km) north of Vieugue Island, in the Biscoe Islands. They were mapped by the Falkland Islands Dependencies Survey (FIDS) from photos taken by Hunting Aerosurveys Ltd in 1956–57. The Trivial Islands were so named by the United Kingdom Antarctic Place-Names Committee (UK-APC) because these islands were considered small, dull, and uninteresting.

== See also ==
- List of Antarctic and sub-Antarctic islands
