= Two Summit Island =

Island in Antarctica

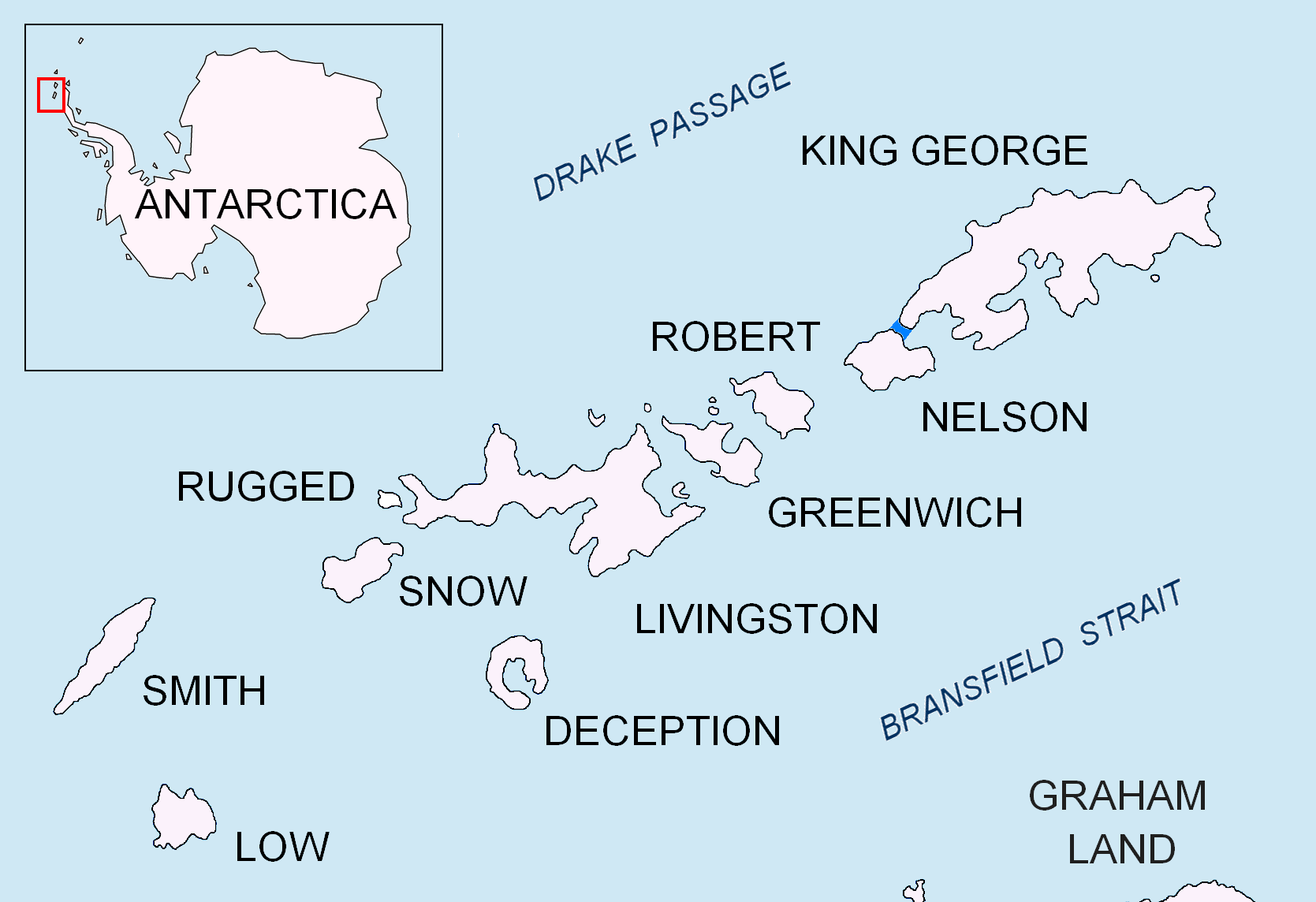
- Location of Fildes Strait in the South Shetland Islands

- Location within Antarctic Peninsula Location within Antarctica

Geography
- Location: Antarctica
- Coordinates: 62°14′10″S 58°56′46″W

Administration
- Administered under the Antarctic Treaty System

Demographics
- Population: Uninhabited

Two Summit Island is a small island marked by two prominent summits, lying at the east entrance to Fildes Strait in the South Shetland Islands. It was named initially named Two Hummock Island by DI personnel following their survey in 1935, but this name has been rejected because of probable confusion with Two Hummock Island in the north entrance to Gerlache Strait. Two Summit Island, equally descriptive of the feature, was recommended by the United Kingdom Antarctic Place-Names Committee (UK-APC) in 1954.

== See also ==
- List of antarctic and sub-antarctic islands
