= Thomsen Islands =

Thomsen Islands (65°47′S 66°16′W) is a group of small islands lying 2 nautical miles (3.7 km) southwest of Speerschneider Point, off the west side of Renaud Island in the Biscoe Islands. First accurately shown on an Argentine government chart of 1957. Named by the United Kingdom Antarctic Place-Names Committee (UK-APC) in 1959 for Helge Thomsen, Danish meteorologist, who, for a number of years beginning in 1946, was responsible for editing Dansk Meteorologisk Institut's annual reports on the state of the sea ice in the Arctic.

== See also ==
- List of Antarctic and sub-Antarctic islands
