= Mica Islands =

Group of four ice-covered islands

- Location within Antarctica

Geography
- Location: Antarctica
- Coordinates: 69°20′S 68°36′W

Administration
- Administered under the Antarctic Treaty System

Demographics
- Population: Uninhabited

The Mica Islands, a group of about four mainly ice-covered islands, lie 13 kilometres (7 nmi) west of Mount Guernsey and 11 kilometres (6 nmi) northeast of Cape Jeremy, off the west coast of the Antarctic Peninsula. The British Graham Land Expedition first sighted them from the air and photographed them in 1936; rough maps later based themselves on the photographs. The Falkland Islands Dependencies Survey visited and surveyed the islands on the ground in 1948, naming them for the mica in the schists which form them.

== See also ==
- List of Antarctic and sub-Antarctic islands
