= Trevillian Island =

Island in Antarctica

Trevillian Island (67°38′S 62°42′E) is a small, oval, humped island 1 nautical mile (1.9 km) south of Nost Island in Holme Bay, Mac. Robertson Land. Mapped by Norwegian cartographers from air photos taken by the Lars Christensen Expedition, 1936–37, and named Rundoy (round island). Renamed by Antarctic Names Committee of Australia (ANCA) for T. Trevillian, draftsman with the Division of National Mapping, Dept. of National Development, Canberra, who for a number of years was responsible for the compilation of maps for ANARE (Australian National Antarctic Research Expeditions).

== See also ==
- List of Antarctic and sub-Antarctic islands
