= Scholander Island =

Scholander Island (66°22′S 66°58′W) is an island 1.5 nautical miles (2.8 km) east of Watkins Island, Biscoe Islands. Mapped from air photos taken by Falkland Islands and Dependencies Aerial Survey Expedition (FIDASE) (1956–57). Named by United Kingdom Antarctic Place-Names Committee (UK-APC) for Per Fredrik Scholander, American physiologist who has investigated many aspects of polar physiology.

== See also ==
- List of Antarctic and sub-Antarctic islands
