= DeLaca Island =

- Location within Antarctica

Geography
- Location: Antarctica
- Coordinates: 64°47′S 64°07′W
- Archipelago: Palmer Archipelago

Administration
- Administered under the Antarctic Treaty System

Demographics
- Population: Uninhabited

DeLaca Island is a small U-shaped island 1.5 km (0.8 nmi) west of Bonaparte Point, off the southwest coast of Anvers Island. DeLaca Island is one of two main investigation areas in a United States Antarctic Research Program (USARP) study of terrestrial arthropods. DeLaca Island was named by the United States Advisory Committee on Antarctic Names (US-ACAN) for Ted E. DeLaca, a member of the University of California, Davis, California, biological team working this area, 1971–1974.

== See also ==
- Composite Antarctic Gazetteer
- List of Antarctic and sub-Antarctic islands
- List of Antarctic islands south of 60° S
- SCAR
- Territorial claims in Antarctica
