= Svenner Islands =

Island group in Antarctica

Svenner Islands (69°2′S 76°50′E) is a small group of islands and rocks lying 14 nautical miles (26 km) southwest of the Rauer Islands in the southeast part of Prydz Bay. Discovered in February 1935 by a Norwegian expedition led by Captain Klarius Mikkelsen. He charted the two main islands in the group and applied the name Svenner after the islands of that name near Sandefjord, Norway. The group was plotted in greater detail from air photos taken by the Lars Christensen Expedition, 1936–37.

== See also ==
- List of antarctic and sub-antarctic islands
