= Horvath Island =

Island of Antarctica

- Location within Antarctica

Geography
- Location: Antarctica
- Coordinates: 66°19′S 67°8′W

Administration
- Administered under the Antarctic Treaty System

Demographics
- Population: Uninhabited

Horvath Island is a small island close north of Watkins Island, in the Biscoe Islands of Antarctica. It was mapped from air photos taken by the Falkland Islands and Dependencies Aerial Survey Expedition (1956–57), and was named by the UK Antarctic Place-Names Committee for Stephen M. Horvath, an American physiologist who has specialized in the peripheral circulation of man in climatic extremes.

== See also ==
- List of Antarctic and sub-Antarctic islands
