= Waratah Islands =

Islands in Enderby Land, Antarctica

Waratah Islands (67°24′S 47°25′E) is a pair of small islands lying close to the coast about 1 nautical mile (1.9 km) northwest of Hannan Ice Shelf, Enderby Land. Plotted from air photos taken from ANARE (Australian National Antarctic Research Expeditions) aircraft in 1956. Named by Antarctic Names Committee of Australia (ANCA) after the Australian native plant Waratah (Telopea truncata).

== See also ==
- List of Antarctic and sub-Antarctic islands
