= Ouellette Island =

Island in Antarctica

- Location within Antarctic Peninsula

Geography
- Location: Antarctica
- Coordinates: 64°47′S 64°25′W

Administration
- Administered under the Antarctic Treaty System

Demographics
- Population: Uninhabited

Ouellette Island is an island 0.9 kilometres (0.5 nmi) west of Howard Island in southern Joubin Islands. Named by Advisory Committee on Antarctic Names (US-ACAN) for Gerald L. Ouellette, chief engineer in the Hero in her first voyage to Antarctica and Palmer Station in 1968.

== See also ==
- List of Antarctic and sub-Antarctic islands
