= Diamonen Island =

Island in Antarctica

- Interactive map of Diamonen Island

Geography
- Location: Gerlache Strait, Graham Land, Antarctica
- Coordinates: 64°02′53″S 61°16′26″W

Diamonen Island is an island lying north of Moreno Rock in Gerlache Strait, off the west coast of Graham Land, Antarctica. It was charted by the Belgian Antarctic Expedition under Gerlache, 1897–99. The island was called "Big Diamonen Island" by Captain Skidsmo of the Graham in 1921–22. The name was shortened by the UK Antarctic Place-Names Committee in 1960.

== See also ==
- List of Antarctic and sub-Antarctic islands
