= Gibbney Island =

Island of Antarctica

- Location within Antarctica

Geography
- Location: Antarctica
- Coordinates: 67°33′S 62°20′E
- Length: 0.6 km (0.37 mi)
- Width: 0.4 km (0.25 mi)

Administration
- Administered under the Antarctic Treaty System

Demographics
- Population: Uninhabited

Gibbney Island is a small island on the west side of Holme Bay, off Mac. Robertson Land, Antarctica. It was mapped by Norwegian cartographers from air photos taken by the Lars Christensen Expedition, 1936–37, and named "Bryggeholmen" (the wharf island). It was renamed by the Antarctic Names Committee of Australia for L.F. Gibbney, officer in charge at Heard Island station in 1952.

== Important Bird Area ==
A 17 ha site, comprising the whole island and adjacent islets, has been designated an Important Bird Area (IBA) by BirdLife International because it supports a breeding colony of about 12,000 Adélie penguins, mostly on the western side of the island, estimated from 2011 satellite imagery.

== See also ==
- List of Antarctic and Subantarctic islands
