= Tot Island =

Island in Graham Land, Antarctica

Tot Island (65°31′S 64°20′W) is a small island lying just north of the northeast end of Lahille Island, off the west coast of Graham Land. First charted by the British Graham Land Expedition (BGLE) under Rymill, 1934–37. So named by the United Kingdom Antarctic Place-Names Committee (UK-APC) in 1959 because the island is very small.

== See also ==
- List of Antarctic and sub-Antarctic islands
