= Laggard Island =

Island in the Palmer Archipelago, Antarctica

- Location within Antarctica

Geography
- Location: Antarctica
- Coordinates: 64°49′S 64°02′W
- Archipelago: Palmer Archipelago

Administration
- Administered under the Antarctic Treaty System

Demographics
- Population: Uninhabited

Laggard Island is a rocky island lying 3.7 km (2 nmi) southeast of Bonaparte Point, off the southwest coast of Anvers Island in the Palmer Archipelago. Laggard Island was named by the United Kingdom Antarctic Place-names Committee (UK-APC) following a 1955 survey by the Falkland Islands Dependencies Survey (FIDS). The name arose from the island's position on the eastern fringe of the islands in the vicinity of Arthur Harbor.

== See also ==
- Composite Antarctic Gazetteer
- List of Antarctic and sub-Antarctic islands
- List of Antarctic islands south of 60° S
- SCAR
- Territorial claims in Antarctica
