= Mazzeo Island =

Island in Wilhelm Archipelago, Antarctica

Mazzeo Island (65°9′S 65°0′W) is an island 0.5 nautical miles (1 km) west-northwest of Quintana Island in the Wilhelm Archipelago, Antarctica. It was named by the UK Antarctic Place-Names Committee for Lieutenant Peter Mazzeo, second survey officer on HMS Endurance working in this area in February 1969.

== See also ==
- List of Antarctic and sub-Antarctic islands
