= Teksla Island =

Island in Antarctica

Teksla Island (67°27′S 60°56′E) (called Norris Island in Australia) is the largest island in the Colbeck Archipelago near the coast of Mac. Robertson Land, 1 nautical mile (1.9 km) north of Chapman Ridge. Mapped by Norwegian cartographers from aerial photographs taken by the Lars Christensen Expedition, 1936–37, and named Teksla (the coopers axe).

== See also ==
- List of Antarctic and sub-Antarctic islands
