= Mariholm =

- Location within Antarctica

Geography
- Location: Antarctica
- Coordinates: 60°45′S 45°42′W

Administration
- Administered under the Antarctic Treaty System

Demographics
- Population: Uninhabited

Mariholm is the highest and easternmost island in a small group which lies 0.6 kilometres (0.3 nmi) south of Moe Island in the South Orkney Islands, Antarctica. It was named on a chart based upon a running survey of the South Orkney Islands by Captain Petter Sorlle in 1912–13.

== See also ==
- List of antarctic and sub-antarctic islands
