= Harry Island =

Island in the Palmer Archipelago, Antarctica

- Location within Antarctica

Geography
- Location: Antarctica
- Coordinates: 64°8′S 61°59′W

Administration
- Administered under the Antarctic Treaty System

Demographics
- Population: Uninhabited

Harry Island is an island off the coast of mainland Antarctica, in the Palmer Archipelago.

== Features and discovery ==
The icecapped island is dominated by a truncated pyramidal peak, lying at the southeast entrance to the channel between Brabant Island and Liège Island. It was discovered by the Belgian Antarctic Expedition under Gerlache, 1897–99, and named for Gerard Harry, Belgian journalist and promoter of the expedition. The island was photographed from the air by FIDASE, 1956-57

== See also ==
- List of Antarctic and sub-Antarctic islands
