= Apollo Island =

Antarctic island

- Location within Antarctica

Geography
- Location: Antarctica
- Coordinates: 70°15′S 1°55′W

Administration
- Administered under the Antarctic Treaty System

Demographics
- Population: Uninhabited

Apollo Island is a small ice-covered island about 33 kilometres (18 nmi) east-northeast of Blåskimen Island in the northwest part of the Fimbul Ice Shelf, Queen Maud Land. The island is 19 kilometres (10 nmi) east-northeast of the site of the first three South African SANAE stations. The name Apollo appears to be first used on a South African map of 1969.

== See also ==
- List of antarctic and sub-antarctic islands
