= Guesalaga Island =

Island in Palmer Archipelago, Antarctica

- Location within Antarctica

Geography
- Location: Antarctica
- Coordinates: 64°16′S 61°59′W

Administration
- Administered under the Antarctic Treaty System

Demographics
- Population: Uninhabited

Guesalaga Island is the northern of two islands lying off the east side of Lecointe Island, in the Palmer Archipelago of Antarctica. It was named by the Chilean Antarctic Expedition of 1947 for its commander, Capitán de Navío Federico Guesalaga Toro.

== See also ==
- List of Antarctic and sub-Antarctic islands
