= Close Islands =

Islands close to Antarctica

Close Island
- Location within Antarctica

Geography
- Location: Antarctica
- Coordinates: 67°1′S 144°27′E

Administration
- Administered under the Antarctic Treaty System

Demographics
- Population: Uninhabited

The Close Islands are a cluster of about three small islands lying in the western part of the entrance to Buchanan Bay, Antarctica. They were discovered by the Australasian Antarctic Expedition (1911–14) under Douglas Mawson, who named the group for John H. Close, a member of the expedition.

== See also ==
- List of Antarctic and sub-Antarctic islands
