= Phoque Island =

Island in Adélie Land, Antarctica

- Location within Antarctica

Geography
- Location: Antarctica
- Coordinates: 66°49′S 141°24′E

Administration
- Administered under the Antarctic Treaty System

Demographics
- Population: Uninhabited

Phoque Island is a rocky island 0.2 kilometres (0.1 nmi) long, the southernmost island in a small group 0.2 kilometres (0.1 nmi) north of Cape Margerie, Antarctica. Charted in 1951 by the French Antarctic Expedition, it was named by them for the numerous seals near the island, "phoque" being the French for seal. The island is located on the South-East of the coast of Antarctica, in the southern hemisphere.

== See also ==
- List of Antarctic and sub-Antarctic islands
