= Tukey Island =

Island in the Palmer Archipelago, Antarctica

Tukey Island (64°46′S 64°26′W) is an island near the center of the Joubin Islands. Named by Advisory Committee on Antarctic Names (US-ACAN) for Claude C. Tukey, Messman in RV Hero on her first voyage to Antarctica and nearby Palmer Station in 1968.

== See also ==
- List of Antarctic and sub-Antarctic islands
