= Casabianca Island =

Island in Palmer Archipelago, Antarctica

- Location within Antarctic Peninsula

Geography
- Location: Antarctica
- Coordinates: 64°49′S 63°31′W
- Archipelago: Palmer Archipelago

Administration
- Administered under the Antarctic Treaty System

Demographics
- Population: Uninhabited

Casabianca Island is a low, rocky island lying in Neumayer Channel 1 kilometre (0.5 nmi) northeast of Damoy Point, Wiencke Island, in the Palmer Archipelago. It was discovered by the French Antarctic Expedition under Jean-Baptiste Charcot, 1903–05, who named it for Monsieur Casabianca, then French Administrator of Naval Enlistment.

== See also ==
- List of Antarctic and sub-Antarctic islands
