= Rescapé Islands =

Island group in Adélie Land, Antarctica

- Location within Antarctica

Geography
- Location: Adélie Coast, Adélie Land
- Coordinates: 66°49′S 141°22′E

Rescapé Islands (66°49′S 141°22′E) is a small group of rocky islands lying 0.5 nautical miles (0.93 km) northwest of Cape Margerie along the Adélie Coast. Surveyed by the French Antarctic Expedition (1949–51) under Andre Liotard, and named in remembrance of an incident of the disembarkation at nearby Port Martin station, when a ship's boat was carried away by the wind.

== See also ==
- List of Antarctic and sub-Antarctic islands
