= Boobyalla Islands =

Islands in Enderby Land, Antarctica

- Location within Antarctica

Geography
- Location: Antarctica
- Coordinates: 67°15′S 46°34′E

Administration
- Administered under the Antarctic Treaty System

Demographics
- Population: Uninhabited

The Boobyalla Islands (67°15′S 46°34′E) are two small islands 4 kilometres (2 nmi) northeast of Kirkby Head, Enderby Land. They were plotted from air photos taken from Australian National Antarctic Research Expeditions aircraft in 1956, and named by the Antarctic Names Committee of Australia after the Australian native willow, "Boobyalla" (Acacia longifolia).

== See also ==
- List of Antarctic and sub-Antarctic islands
