= Karelin Islands =

Island group in Antarctica

- Location within Antarctic Peninsula Location within Antarctica

Geography
- Location: Antarctica
- Coordinates: 65°35′S 65°35′W

Administration
- Administered under the Antarctic Treaty System

Demographics
- Population: Uninhabited

The Karelin Islands are a group of islands 6 km (3 nmi) in extent, lying 6 km (3 nmi) southeast of Tula Point, Renaud Island, in the Biscoe Islands of Antarctica. They were first accurately shown on an Argentine government chart of 1957, and were named by the UK Antarctic Place-Names Committee in 1959 for Dmitriy Karelin (1913–1953), a Soviet meteorologist and pioneer of research on sea ice recording and forecasting.

== See also ==
- List of Antarctic and sub-Antarctic islands
