= Pinnacle Rock (Antarctica) =

Rock in the South Shetland Islands

Coordinates: 61°06′S 54°47′W

Pinnacle Rock, sometimes named Roca de la Aguja or Pinnacle Island, is a rocky island, rising to 120 m above sea level, in the South Shetland Islands. It lies 2.5 miles (4.0 km) to the east of Point Wild and close to the north coast of Elephant Island, which is partly connected to it by a reef. Its current name, made official in 1952, was probably suggested by members of the British expedition under Shackleton, 1914–16, who sighted and described this feature as a pillar of rock during their refuge at Elephant Island following the loss of the Endurance.

== See also ==
- List of Antarctic and sub-Antarctic islands
