= Mane Skerry =

Island in Antarctica

- Location within Antarctica

Geography
- Location: Antarctica
- Coordinates: 67°50′S 67°18′W

Administration
- Administered under the Antarctic Treaty System

Demographics
- Population: Uninhabited

Mane Skerry is a small island in the central part of Lystad Bay, off Horseshoe Island, Antarctica. It was named from association with nearby Mite Skerry; an initial misspelling of the phrase "might and main" became established at the Falkland Islands Dependencies Survey station in the years 1955–57.
