= Reluctant Island =

Island in Graham Land, Antarctica

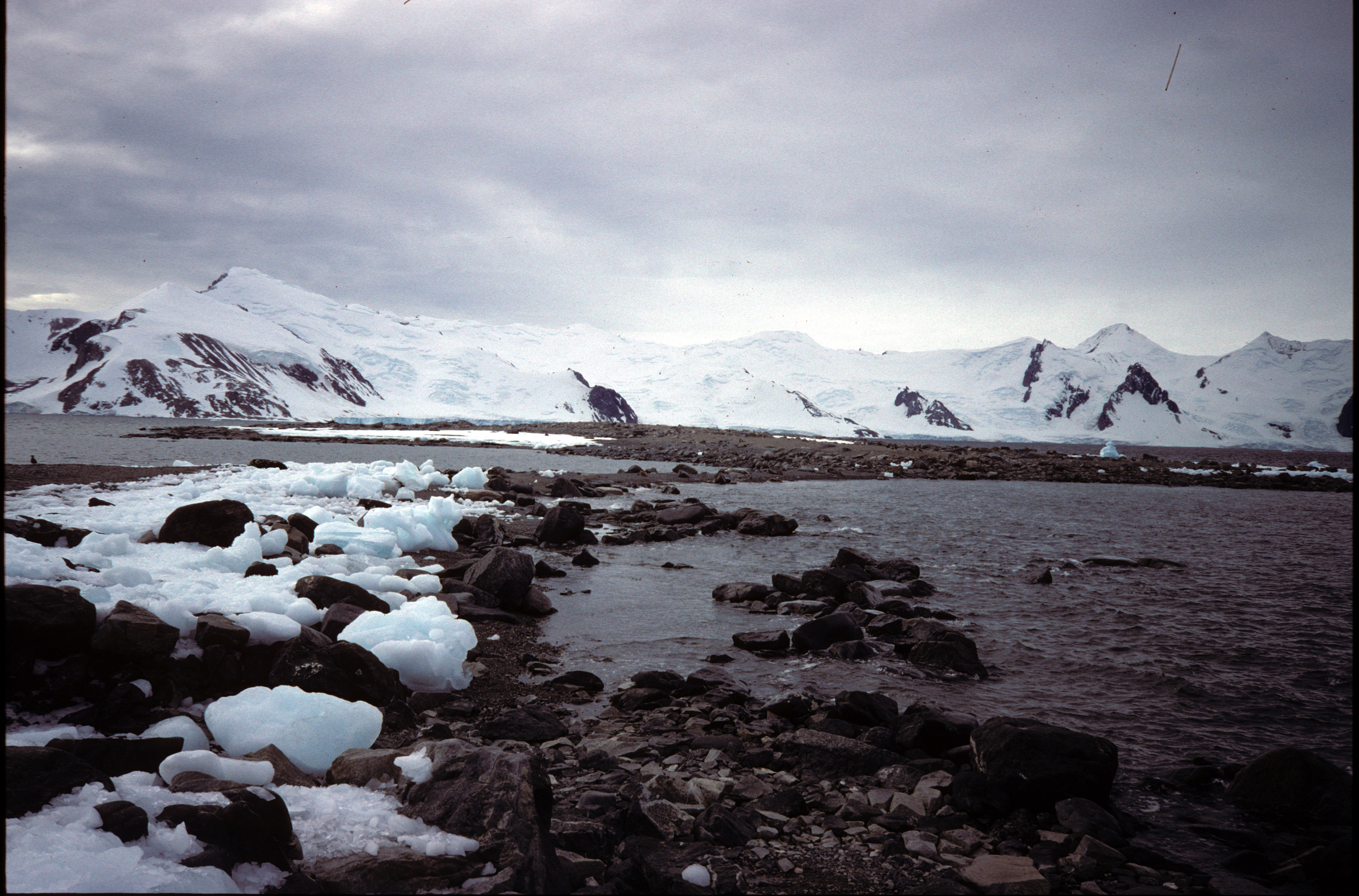
- Reluctant Island

- Location within Antarctica

Geography
- Location: Fallières Coast, Marguerite Bay, Graham Land
- Coordinates: 67°50′S 67°5′W

Reluctant Island (67°50′S 67°5′W) is a small island off eastern Horseshoe Island. Surveyed by Falkland Islands Dependencies Survey (FIDS) in 1955–57. So named because of the feature's apparent reluctance to be recognized as an island; it did not appear on maps of the British Graham Land Expedition (BGLE) 1934–37 and was mapped as a peninsula by FIDS in 1948–50.

== See also ==
- List of Antarctic and sub-Antarctic islands
