= Grinnell Island =

Island in Antarctica

- Location within Antarctica

Geography
- Location: Antarctica
- Coordinates: 66°11′S 110°24′E

Administration
- Administered under the Antarctic Treaty System

Demographics
- Population: Uninhabited

Grinnell Island is an island 1 kilometre (0.5 nmi) long, lying south of Chappel Island in the Donovan Islands of Antarctica. It was first mapped from air photos taken by U.S. Navy Operation Highjump, 1946–47, and was named by Carl R. Eklund for Lieutenant Sheldon W. Grinnell of the U.S. Navy Reserve Medical Corps, a medical officer at Wilkes Station, 1957.

== See also ==
- List of antarctic and sub-antarctic islands
