= Tonagh Island =

Island in Enderby Land, Antarctica

Tonagh Island (67°6′S 50°18′E) is a steep-sided, flat-topped island, 4 nautical miles (7 km) long and 2 nautical miles (3.7 km) wide, lying southwest of the mouth of Beaver Glacier in the south part of Amundsen Bay. Sighted in October 1956 by an ANARE (Australian National Antarctic Research Expeditions) party led by P.W. Crohn and named for Lieutenant Leslie Tonagh, DUKW driver with the ANARE, 1956.

== See also ==
- List of Antarctic and sub-Antarctic islands
