= Mousinho Island =

Island in Antarctica

- Location within Antarctica

Geography
- Location: Antarctica
- Coordinates: 70°38′S 71°58′E
- Highest elevation: 235 m (771 ft)

Administration
- Administered under the Antarctic Treaty System

Demographics
- Population: Uninhabited

Mousinho Island is a partly ice-covered island, 235 m high, about 3.7 kilometres (2 nmi) from the south end of Gillock Island in the Amery Ice Shelf. Photographed by U.S. Navy Operation Highjump (1946–47) and ANARE (Australian National Antarctic Research Expeditions) (1958). First visited by a party led by J. Manning, from the ANARE Prince Charles Mountains survey in January 1969. Named by Antarctic Names Committee of Australia (ANCA) for A. Mousinho, pilot of the Beaver aircraft with the 1969 ANARE Prince Charles Mountains party.

== See also ==
- List of Antarctic and sub-Antarctic islands
