= Perch Island =

Island in Graham Land, Antarctica

- Location within Antarctica

Geography
- Location: Antarctica
- Coordinates: 66°0′S 65°22′W

Administration
- Administered under the Antarctic Treaty System

Demographics
- Population: Uninhabited

Perch Island is an island lying just off Prospect Point in the Fish Islands, off the west coast of Graham Land. Charted by the British Graham Land Expedition (BGLE) under Rymill, 1934–37. So named by the United Kingdom Antarctic Place-Names Committee (UK-APC) in 1959 because it is one of the Fish Islands.

== See also ==
- List of Antarctic and sub-Antarctic islands
