= Tongue Rock =

Insular rock

Tongue Rock (67°33′S 62°0′E) is an insular rock just north of Low Tongue, off Mac. Robertson Land. Mapped by Norwegian cartographers from air photos taken by the Lars Christensen Expedition, 1936–37, and named Tangskjera (the tongue rock). The translated form of the name recommended by Antarctic Names Committee of Australia (ANCA) has been approved.
