= Jurien Island =

Island in Antarctica

- Location within Antarctica

Geography
- Location: Antarctica
- Coordinates: 63°32′S 59°49′W

Administration
- Administered under the Antarctic Treaty System

Demographics
- Population: Uninhabited

Jurien Island is a small island lying north of Cape Leguillou, the northern tip of Tower Island, in the Palmer Archipelago, Antarctica. The island was first charted and named by Captain Jules Dumont d'Urville on March 4, 1838.

== See also ==
- List of Antarctic and sub-Antarctic islands
