= Mulga Island =

Island in Enderby Land, Antarctica

- Location within Antarctica

Geography
- Location: Antarctica
- Coordinates: 67°14′S 46°43′E

Administration
- Administered under the Antarctic Treaty System

Demographics
- Population: Uninhabited

Mulga Island is a small island 5.6 kilometres (3 nmi) off the coast and 9.3 kilometres (5 nmi) northeast of Kirkby Head, Enderby Land in Antarctica. Plotted from air photos taken from ANARE (Australian National Antarctic Research Expeditions) aircraft in 1956. Mulga is the vernacular name for species of Acacia found in semi-desert areas of Australia.

== See also ==
- List of Antarctic and sub-Antarctic islands
