= Sirius Islands =

Islands in Antarctica

Sirius Islands (66°57′S 57°27′E) is a chain of islands in the north part of the Oygarden Group in Antarctica. Mapped by Norwegian cartographers from aerial photos taken by the Lars Christensen Expedition, 1936–37, and called Nordoyane (the north islands). The group was first visited by an ANARE (Australian National Antarctic Research Expeditions) party in 1954; this chain was renamed by Antarctic Names Committee of Australia (ANCA) after the star Sirius which was used for an astrofix in the vicinity.

== See also ==
- List of Antarctic and sub-Antarctic islands
