= Pig Rock =

Island in the South Shetland Islands

Nickname: Location of Nelson Island in the South Shetland Islands

- Location within Antarctica

Geography
- Location: Antarctica
- Coordinates: 62°18′30″S 58°47′34″W

Administration
- Administered under the Antarctic Treaty System

Demographics
- Population: Uninhabited

Pig Rock is a rock, 65 m high, the largest of a group of rocks lying 1.9 kilometres (1 nmi) east of the east end of Nelson Island, in the South Shetland Islands. This rock, known to sealers in the area as early as 1821, was charted and named by DI personnel on the Discovery II in 1935.

== See also ==
- List of Antarctic and sub-Antarctic islands
- South Shetland Islands
