= Limpet Island =

Island in Antarctica

- Location within Antarctica

Geography
- Location: Antarctica
- Coordinates: 67°38′S 68°18′W

Administration
- Administered under the Antarctic Treaty System

Demographics
- Population: Uninhabited

Limpet Island is the southernmost of the Léonie Islands, Antarctica, lying in the entrance to Ryder Bay, close off the southeast coast of Adelaide Island. The Léonie Islands were discovered and first roughly surveyed in 1909 by the Fourth French Antarctic Expedition under Jean-Baptiste Charcot. Limpet Island was surveyed in 1948 by the Falkland Islands Dependencies Survey and so named by them because of the large number of limpet shells found there.

== See also ==
- List of Antarctic and sub-Antarctic islands
