= Oyako Islands =

Island in Antarctica

- Location within Antarctica

Geography
- Location: Antarctica
- Coordinates: 68°28′S 41°24′E

Administration
- Administered under the Antarctic Treaty System

Demographics
- Population: Uninhabited

Oyako Islands are two small islands, one very tiny, lying immediately north of Cape Akarui on the coast of Queen Maud Land. Mapped from surveys and air photos by Japanese Antarctic Research Expedition (JARE), 1957–62, and named Oyako-shima (parent and child islands).

== See also ==
- List of antarctic and sub-antarctic islands
