= Manning Island =

Island in Antarctica

- Location within Antarctica

Geography
- Location: Antarctica
- Coordinates: 69°21′18″S 76°20′0″E

Administration
- Administered under the Antarctic Treaty System

Demographics
- Population: Uninhabited

Manning Island is an island in the vicinity of Antarctica. It was named after surveyor John Manning, in honour of his work in Antarctica. The Lars Christensen expedition of 1936–1937 photographed it from the air, calling it Viksy (Bay Island).

== See also ==
- SCAR Composite Gazetteer of Antarctica
- List of Antarctic islands south of 60° S
- SCAR
- Territorial claims in Antarctica
