= Bills Island =

Island in Palmer Archipelago, Antarctica

- Location within Antarctica

Geography
- Location: Antarctica
- Coordinates: 64°49′S 63°30′W
- Archipelago: Palmer Archipelago

Administration
- Administered under the Antarctic Treaty System

Demographics
- Population: Uninhabited

Bills Island is an island in Antarctica. It lies northeast of Goudier Island in the harbor of Port Lockroy, in the Palmer Archipelago. It was discovered and charted by the French Antarctic Expedition, 1903–05, under Jean-Baptiste Charcot. The name appears on a chart based on a 1927 Discovery Investigations survey, but may reflect an earlier naming.

== See also ==
- List of Antarctic and sub-Antarctic islands
