= Wittmann Island =

Island in Antarctica

- Location within Antarctica

Geography
- Location: Antarctica
- Coordinates: 65°44′S 65°49′W

Administration
- Administered under the Antarctic Treaty System

Demographics
- Population: Uninhabited

Wittmann Island is an island lying 3.7 km (2 nmi) west-southwest of Nusser Island, off the east side of Renaud Island in the Biscoe Islands. First accurately shown on an Argentine government chart of 1957, it was named by the United Kingdom Antarctic Place-Names Committee (UK-APC) in 1959 after Walter I. Wittmann, an American oceanographer who has specialized in sea ice studies.

== See also ==
- List of Antarctic and sub-Antarctic islands
