= Verte Island =

Island off Antarctica

- Location within Antarctica

Geography
- Location: Antarctica
- Coordinates: 66°44′S 141°11′E

Administration
- Administered under the Antarctic Treaty System

Demographics
- Population: Uninhabited

Verte Island is a small rocky island 1.9 kilometres (1 nmi) north of the Double Islands and 2.8 kilometres (1.5 nmi) east of the tip of Zelee Glacier Tongue. It was photographed from the air by U.S. Navy Operation Highjump, 1946–47. It was charted by the French Antarctic Expedition, 1949–51, and so named by them because of its greenish appearance, "verte" being French for green.

== See also ==
- List of Antarctic and sub-Antarctic islands
