= Kroshka Island =

Island in Antarctica

- Location within Antarctica

Geography
- Location: Antarctica
- Coordinates: 70°40′S 2°5′E

Administration
- Administered under the Antarctic Treaty System

Demographics
- Population: Uninhabited

Kroshka Island is the smaller of two ice-covered islands lying close together in the Fimbul Ice Shelf, along the coast of Queen Maud Land, Antarctica. The feature was first mapped by the Soviet Antarctic Expedition in 1961 and named "Kupol Kroshka", which means "crumb dome" in Russian.

== See also ==
- List of antarctic and sub-antarctic islands
