= Law Islands =

Island group in Enderby Land, Antarctica

- Location within Antarctica

Geography
- Location: Antarctica
- Coordinates: 67°15′S 59°02′E

Administration
- Administered under the Antarctic Treaty System

Demographics
- Population: Uninhabited

Law Islands is a group of small islands lying off the east end of Law Promontory, at the west side of the entrance to Stefansson Bay. They were mapped by Norwegian cartographers from aerial photos taken by the Lars Christensen Expedition (1936–37), and first visited by an ANARE party led by P.W. Crohn in 1956. They were so named by Antarctic Names Committee of Australia (ANCA) because of their proximity to Law Promontory.

== See also ==
- List of antarctic and sub-antarctic islands
