= Bradford Rock =

Rock formation in Antarctica

- Location within Antarctica

Geography
- Coordinates: 66°13′S 110°34′E
- Archipelago: Swain Islands

Administration
- Administered under the Antarctic Treaty System

Demographics
- Population: Uninhabited

Bradford Rock is an insular rock, mainly ice-covered, which marks the northwest end of the Swain Islands. It was first roughly mapped from air photos taken by U.S. Navy Operation Highjump, 1946–47, and included in a 1957 survey of Swain Islands by Wilkes Station personnel under Carl R. Eklund. It was named by Eklund for Radioman Donald L. Bradford, U.S. Navy, a Navy support force member of the 1957 wintering party at Wilkes Station during the IGY.

== See also ==
- Composite Antarctic Gazetteer
- List of Antarctic islands south of 60° S
- Scientific Committee on Antarctic Research
- Territorial claims in Antarctica
