= Baffle Rock =

- Location within Antarctica

Geography
- Location: Antarctica
- Coordinates: 68°12′S 67°5′W

Administration
- Administered under the Antarctic Treaty System

Demographics
- Population: Uninhabited

Baffle Rock is a small rock, just visible at the surface at high tide, lying in the center of the deep water channel approach to Stonington Island, 1.1 kilometres (0.6 nmi) northwest of the western tip of Neny Island in Marguerite Bay. The rock was surveyed in 1947 by the Falkland Islands Dependencies Survey, and so named by them because it is difficult to see and hinders approaching ships.
