= Van Rocks =

- Location of Smith Island in the South Shetland Islands

- Location within Antarctica

Geography
- Location: Antarctica
- Coordinates: 63°6′S 62°50′W
- Archipelago: South Shetland Islands

Administration
- Administered under the Antarctic Treaty System

Demographics
- Population: Uninhabited

Topographic map of Smith Island.

Van Rocks are very conspicuous pinnacle rocks lying close west of Cape James, Smith Island, in the South Shetland Islands. They were roughly shown as a small island on a chart resulting from a British expedition under Foster, 1828–31, and then more accurately delineated by the Falkland Islands Dependencies Survey (FIDS) in 1959 from air photos taken by the Falkland Islands and Dependencies Aerial Survey Expedition (FIDASE), 1955–57. They were named by the United Kingdom Antarctic Place-Names Committee (UK-APC) because they mark the first or westernmost of the South Shetland Islands.

== Maps ==
- Chart of South Shetland including Coronation Island, &c. from the exploration of the sloop Dove in the years 1821 and 1822 by George Powell Commander of the same. Scale ca. 1:200000. London: Laurie, 1822.
- L.L. Ivanov. Antarctica: Livingston Island and Greenwich, Robert, Snow and Smith Islands. Scale 1:120000 topographic map. Troyan: Manfred Wörner Foundation, 2010. ISBN 978-954-92032-9-5 (First edition 2009. ISBN 978-954-92032-6-4)
- South Shetland Islands: Smith and Low Islands. Scale 1:150000 topographic map No. 13677. British Antarctic Survey, 2009.
- Antarctic Digital Database (ADD). Scale 1:250000 topographic map of Antarctica. Scientific Committee on Antarctic Research (SCAR). Since 1993, regularly upgraded and updated.
- L.L. Ivanov. Antarctica: Livingston Island and Smith Island. Scale 1:100000 topographic map. Manfred Wörner Foundation, 2017. ISBN 978-619-90008-3-0
