= Anchorage Island, Princess Elizabeth Land =

Island in Antarctica

Anchorage Island
- Location within Antarctica

Geography
- Location: Antarctica
- Coordinates: 68°33′46″S 77°55′54″E

Administration
- Administered under the Antarctic Treaty System

Demographics
- Population: Uninhabited

Anchorage Island is an island about 1 km long and 0.5 km wide, approximately 2 km north-west of Davis Station. It was mapped by Norwegian cartographers from aerial photographs taken by the Lars Christensen Expedition (1936–37). Its name comes from the fact that ships arriving to relieve Davis Station used the island as an anchoring point.

It is located close to the Antarctic mainland and is uninhabited. Three crosses are located on the island commemorating Australian expeditioners who have died while at Davis Station.
