= Caraquet Rock =

Island in South Shetland Islands

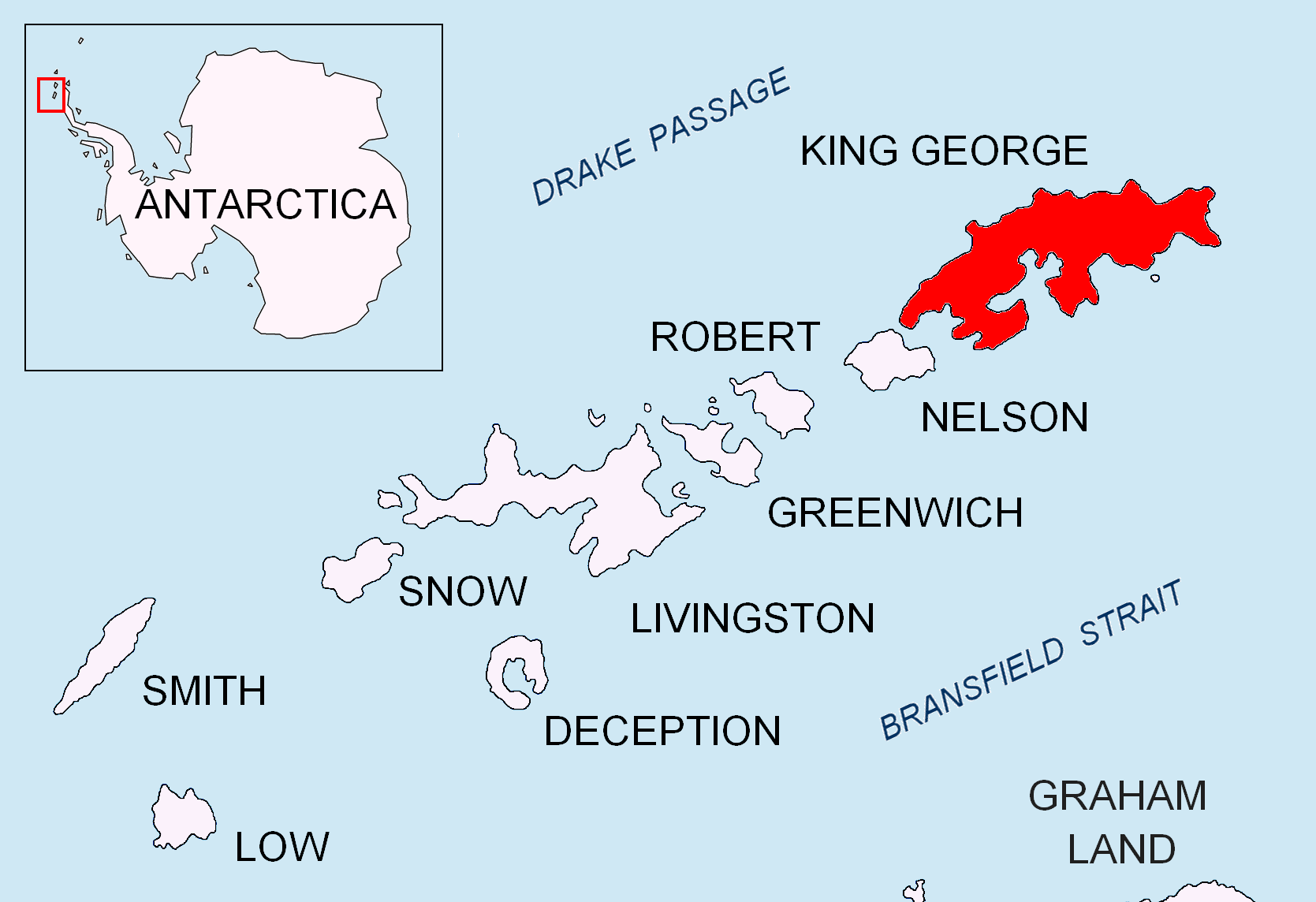
Location of King George Island in the South Shetland Islands.

Caraquet Rock (62°7′S 59°2′W) is a rock lying nearly 4 nautical miles (7 km) west-southwest of Bell Point, off the west part of King George Island in the South Shetland Islands. It was named by the UK Antarctic Place-Names Committee in 1960 for the sealing vessel Caraquet (Captain J. Usher) from Liverpool, which visited the South Shetland Islands in 1821–22.
