= Field Rock =

- Location within Antarctica

Geography
- Location: Antarctica
- Coordinates: 67°36′S 62°54′E

Administration
- Administered under the Antarctic Treaty System

Demographics
- Population: Uninhabited

Field Rock is a rock outcrop 1 kilometre (0.5 nmi) south of Teyssier Island, on the coast of Mac. Robertson Land, Antarctica. It was mapped from Australian National Antarctic Research Expeditions surveys and air photos, 1954–62 and named by the Antarctic Names Committee of Australia for E.D. Field, a cook at the nearby Mawson Station, 1957.
