= Svip Rocks =

Svip Rocks (62°35′S 61°38′W) is a group of submerged rocks reported to lie 9 nautical miles (17 km) west-northwest of Rugged Island, in the South Shetland Islands. The name seems first to appear on the charts of the French Antarctic Expedition, 1908–10, under Charcot. It probably derives from the Svip, a whale catcher operating in the area at that time.
