= Petty Rocks =

- Location within Antarctica

Geography
- Location: Antarctica
- Coordinates: 67°34′S 67°29′W

Administration
- Administered under the Antarctic Treaty System

Demographics
- Population: Uninhabited

Petty Rocks is a group of small rocks lying 5.6 kilometres (3 nmi) southeast of Cape Saenz in the center of the west part of Bigourdan Fjord, off the west coast of Graham Land. First roughly surveyed in 1936 by the British Graham Land Expedition (BGLE) under Rymill. Resurveyed in 1948 by the Falkland Islands Dependencies Survey (FIDS) and named Petty Rock because of its small size. Air photos have disclosed that there are several rocks instead of just one.
