= Gränicher Island =

Island in Graham Land, Antarctica

- Location within Antarctica

Geography
- Location: Antarctica
- Coordinates: 66°53′S 67°43′W

Administration
- Administered under the Antarctic Treaty System

Demographics
- Population: Uninhabited

Gränicher Island is a small island which is the northernmost of the Bennett Islands in Hanusse Bay, Antarctica. It was mapped from air photos obtained by the Ronne Antarctic Research Expedition (1947–48) and the Falkland Islands and Dependencies Aerial Survey Expedition (1956–57). It was named by the UK Antarctic Place-Names Committee for Walter H.H. Gränicher, a Swiss physicist who from 1954 made important investigations of the electrical and mechanical properties of ice in relation to its molecular structure.

== See also ==
- List of Antarctic and sub-Antarctic islands
