= Point Widdows =

Point Widdows (67°42′S 45°25′E) is a point at the west side of the entrance to Freeth Bay on the coast of Enderby Land. It was plotted from aerial photos taken by ANARE (Australian National Antarctic Research Expeditions) in 1956, and was named by Antarctic Names Committee of Australia (ANCA) for E.I. Widdows, meteorologist at Mawson Station in 1959.
