= Fuente Rock =

Low rock surmounted by a navigational beacon

Fuente Rock (62°30′S 59°41′W) is a low rock surmounted by a navigational beacon, 0.4 nautical miles (0.7 km) northeast of Ferrer Point in Discovery Bay, Greenwich Island, South Shetland Islands. The name derives from the form "Islote de la Fuente" appearing on a Chilean hydrographic chart of 1951.
