= Tenorio Rock =

Rock in Antarcrtica

Tenorio Rock (62°28′S 59°44′W) is a rock 0.4 nautical miles (0.7 km) offshore in western Discovery Bay, Greenwich Island, South Shetland Islands. The Chilean Antarctic Expedition of 1947, under the command of Captain Federico Guesalaga Toro, conducted a comprehensive survey of the bay and named the feature Aviador Tenorio Islet after Lieutenant Humbert Tenorio Iturra of the Chilean Air Force, second pilot of the Sikorsky helicopter employed by the survey. Chilean hydrographic charts of the 1950s show the name "Islote Tenorio" and "Islote Aviador Tenorio".
