= Stipple Rocks =

Stipple Rocks (68°6′S 67°22′W) is a compact group of more than twenty rocks, lying 3 nautical miles (6 km) northwest of Millerand Island in Marguerite Bay, off the west coast of Graham Land, Antarctica. The group of rocks were first surveyed in 1936 by the British Graham Land Expedition (BGLE) under Rymill, and resurveyed in 1949 by the Falkland Islands Dependencies Survey (FIDS). The name, applied by FIDS, is descriptive of the representation on a map of the numerous rocks in this group. It is one of many named Rock formations of Graham Land.
