= Lurker Rock =

- Location within Antarctica

Geography
- Location: Antarctica
- Coordinates: 68°3′S 68°44′W

Administration
- Administered under the Antarctic Treaty System

Demographics
- Population: Uninhabited

Lurker Rock is a rock 3 metres (10 ft) high, located 6 kilometres (3 nmi) northeast of Dismal Island, Faure Islands, in Marguerite Bay, Antarctica. It was charted by the Hydrographic Survey Unit from RRS John Biscoe in 1966. The name, applied by the UK Antarctic Place-Names Committee in 1971, is descriptive of the feature, which is covered by ice and can easily be mistaken for a piece of floating ice, especially at high water.
