= Trundy Island =

Island in Palmer Archipelago, Antarctica

Coordinates: 64°47′S 64°28′W

Trundy Island is an island 0.4 nautical miles (0.7 km) west-northwest of Robbins Island in the west part of Joubin Islands. Named by Advisory Committee on Antarctic Names (US-ACAN) for George B. Trundy, Able Seaman in the R.V. Hero in her first voyage to Antarctica and nearby Palmer Station in 1968.

== See also ==
- List of Antarctic and sub-Antarctic islands
