= Low Tongue =

Geographic feature in Antarctica

Low Tongue (67°33′S 62°0′E) is a tongue of rock, measuring 0.1 nautical miles (0.2 km) long, projecting from the icy coast of Mac. Robertson Land, Antarctica, just west of Holme Bay. It was mapped by Norwegian cartographers from air photos taken by the Lars Christensen Expedition, 1936–37, and named "Lagtangen" (the low tongue). The translated form of the name recommended by the Antarctic Names Committee of Australia has been approved.
