= Chameau Island =

Island in Adélie Land, Antarctica

- Location within Antarctica

Geography
- Location: Antarctica
- Coordinates: 66°46′S 141°36′E

Administration
- Administered under the Antarctic Treaty System

Demographics
- Population: Uninhabited

Chameau Island is a rocky island 0.2 kilometres (0.1 nmi) long, lying 1.5 kilometres (0.8 nmi) east of Cape Découverte in the Curzon Islands. It was charted and named in 1951 by the French Antarctic Expedition. The name is suggestive of the island's form which resembles the two humps on a (bactrian) camel, "chameau" being a French word for camel.

== See also ==
- List of Antarctic and sub-Antarctic islands
