= Douanier Rock =

Small rocky island in Antarctica

- Location within Antarctica

Geography
- Location: Antarctica
- Coordinates: 66°49′S 142°4′E

Administration
- Administered under the Antarctic Treaty System

Demographics
- Population: Uninhabited

Douanier Rock is a small rocky island lying close to the coast and just east of Point Alden, Antarctica, the point which separates Adélie Coast and George V Coast. It was discovered and named "Rocher du Douanier" by the 1949 French expedition under André Liotard. The name is whimsical. It alludes to the coastal division and the proximity of this island, "douanier" being a French term for a customs officer.
