= Burtis Island =

Island in Marie Byrd Land, Antarctica

- Location within Antarctica

Geography
- Location: Antarctica
- Coordinates: 73°04′S 125°29′W

Administration
- Administered under the Antarctic Treaty System

Demographics
- Population: Uninhabited

Burtis Island (73°04′S 125°29′W) is a small island lying 19 kilometres (10 nmi) east of Cape Dart, Siple Island, off the coast of Marie Byrd Land. It was mapped by the U.S. Geological Survey from U.S. Navy aerial photography, 1962–65, and named by the Advisory Committee on Antarctic Names for William J. Burtis, an ionospheric physicist at Byrd Station in 1965.
