= Brothers Rocks =

Rock formation in South Georgia and the South Sandwich Islands, United Kingdom

The Brothers Rocks (57°46′S 26°25′W) are a group of rocks surrounded by foul ground lying 1 nautical mile (2 km) east of the north part of Saunders Island in the South Sandwich Islands. They were charted and named in 1930 by Discovery Investigations personnel on the RSS Discovery II.
