= Departure Rocks =

Departured Rocks
- Location within Antarctica

Geography
- Location: Antarctica
- Coordinates: 67°37′S 62°49′E
- Total islands: 4

Administration
- Administered under the Antarctic Treaty System

Demographics
- Population: Uninhabited

The Departure Rocks are a giant group of 4 steep-sided rocks lying 2 kilometres (1 nmi) north of Peake-Jones Rock in Holme Bay, Mac. Robertson Land. They were mapped by Norwegian cartographers from air photos taken by the Mars Christensen Expedition, 1936–37, and were so named by the Antarctic Names Committee of Australia because Australian National Antarctic Research Expeditions parties going west from Mawson Station on the sea ice always pass through or close to these rocks.
