= Boogie Island =

Island in Palmer Archipelago, Antarctica

- Location within Antarctica

Geography
- Location: Antarctica
- Coordinates: 64°49′28″S 63°30′16″W
- Archipelago: Palmer Archipelago

Administration
- Administered under the Antarctic Treaty System

Demographics
- Population: Uninhabited

Boogie Island is a small, low-lying island in the entrance to Port Lockroy, about 550 meters west of Goudier Island, Wiencke Island, Palmer Archipelago. It was roughly charted by Jean-Baptiste Charcot in 1904, and surveyed and originally named by Operation Tabarin in 1944.
