= New Rock (South Shetland Islands) =

Rocky islet of the South Shetland Islands

- Location within Antarctica

Geography
- Location: Antarctica
- Coordinates: 63°1′S 60°44′W
- Archipelago: South Shetland Islands
- Highest elevation: 105 m (344 ft)

Administration
- Administered under the Antarctic Treaty System

Demographics
- Population: Uninhabited

New Rock is a rock, 105 m high, lying 1.4 kilometres (0.75 nmi) off the southwest coast of Deception Island, in the South Shetland Islands. The name of the rock derives from its relatively recent charting in about 1929.
