= McCallie Rocks, Australian Antarctic Territory =

Rock formation in the Australian Antarctic Territory

McCallie Rocks
- Location within Antarctica

Geography
- Location: Antarctica
- Coordinates: 68°18′38″S 78°38′36.6″E

Administration
- Administered under the Antarctic Treaty System

Demographics
- Population: Uninhabited

McCallie Rocks are two rocks located in the sea about 0.3 kilometres (0.19 mi) off the coast of Antarctica in the Vestfold Hills region. They are named after Michael McCallie, a helicopter pilot, who flew survey parties around the Vestfold Hills in 1978–79 in an exemplary manner and made the first landings by air on the rocks. The rocks are dark grey and rounded with diameters of about 100 metres (330 ft). Survey station NM/S/267 was established there in January 1979.

This isolated pair of closely adjacent rocks lies in the sea off the ice-cliff coastline of Princess Elizabeth Land approximately 40.5 kilometres (25.2 mi) north-east of Davis Station. The summit of the southernmost rock, upon which survey station NM/S/267 was established in January, 1979, and to which the above WGS84 coordinates refer, is 15.9 metres (52 ft) above mean sea level. The summit of the northernmost rock, upon which survey station NM/S/271 was established, is 8.9 metres (29 ft) above mean sea level. Survey station NM/S/271 lies on a true bearing of 11° 47′ distant 172.9 metres (567 ft) from survey station NM/S/267.

These rocks form part of an extensive network of Adelie penguin breeding rookeries along the ice-free rock areas of the Ingrid Christensen Coast, Princess Elizabeth Land.

This name originates from Australia. It is part of the Australian Antarctic Gazetteer (ID number 2457) and the SCAR Composite Gazetteer of Antarctica (ID number 9214).
