= Chata Rock =

Rock in Antarctica

Chata Rock (64°52′S 63°44′W) is a low isolated rock over which the sea breaks heavily constantly, lying 0.5 nautical miles (1 km) south of Cape Lancaster, the southern end of Anvers Island, in the Palmer Archipelago. The name appears on an Argentine government chart of 1950 and is probably descriptive, "chata" being a Spanish word for "flat".
