= Cruzen Island =

Island in Marie Byrd Land, Antarctica

- Location within Antarctica

Geography
- Location: Antarctica
- Coordinates: 74°47′S 140°42′W

Administration
- Administered under the Antarctic Treaty System

Demographics
- Population: Uninhabited

Cruzen Island is a rocky, but mostly snow-covered island about 93 kilometres (50 nmi) north-northeast of the mouth of Land Glacier off the coast of Marie Byrd Land, Antarctica. It was discovered in 1940 on aerial flights from the West Base of the US Antarctic Service, and named for Commander Richard Cruzen, US Navy, the commanding officer of the USS Bear and second in command of the expedition.
