= Buffer Island =

- Location within Antarctica

Geography
- Location: Antarctica
- Coordinates: 69°10′S 67°19′W

Administration
- Administered under the Antarctic Treaty System

Demographics
- Population: Uninhabited

Buffer Island is a mostly ice-covered island lying west of the Wordie Ice Shelf, 17 kilometres (9 nmi) northwest of Mount Balfour, Fallières Coast. The feature was photographed from aircraft by the Ronne Antarctic Research Expedition in 1947. Following survey by the Falkland Islands Dependencies Survey in 1958 it was named "Buffer Ice Rise" by the UK Antarctic Place-names Committee (UK-APC) because it obstructed the northwestward flow of the ice shelf in this vicinity. The UK-APC amended the name to Buffer Island following a general eastward recession of the Wordie Ice Front in about 1999, which disclosed the feature to be an island.
