= Castle Rock (South Shetland Islands) =

Castle Rock (62°48′S 61°34′W) is a conspicuous rock, 175 metres (570 ft) high, lying 2 miles (3 km) off the west side of Snow Island, in the South Shetland Islands. This descriptive name dates back to 1822 and is now established in international usage.
