= Pingvin Island =

Island in Antarctica

- Location within Antarctica

Geography
- Location: Antarctica
- Coordinates: 65°45′S 81°50′E

Administration
- Administered under the Antarctic Treaty System

Demographics
- Population: Uninhabited

Pingvin Island is a small island lying off the northwest side of the West Ice Shelf in Antarctica. It was first mapped by the 1956–57 Soviet expedition, who named it Pingvin (the Russian word for "Penguin"). Although it appears on most modern maps, according to some sources the island does not exist.
