= Mite Skerry =

Island in Antarctica

- Location within Antarctica

Geography
- Location: Antarctica
- Coordinates: 67°52′S 67°19′W

Administration
- Administered under the Antarctic Treaty System

Demographics
- Population: Uninhabited

Mite Skerry is a small island in the south part of the entrance to Lystad Bay, off Horseshoe Island, Antarctica. It was named by UK Antarctic Place-Names Committee in 1958; the name is descriptive of its small size.
