= Mida Island =

Antarctic island

- Location within Antarctica Location within Antarctic Peninsula

Geography
- Location: Antarctica
- Coordinates: 64°56′49.7″S 64°00′21″W
- Archipelago: Wilhelm Archipelago
- Area: 1.15 ha (2.8 acres)
- Length: 204 m (669 ft)
- Width: 93 m (305 ft)

Administration
- Administered under the Antarctic Treaty System

Demographics
- Population: Uninhabited

Mida Island (Bulgarian: остров Мида, romanized: ostrov Mida, IPA: [ˈostrof ˈmidɐ]) is the rocky island 204 m long in west–east direction and 93 m wide, part of Vetrilo Rocks in the Wauwermans Islands group of Wilhelm Archipelago in the Antarctic Peninsula region. Their surface area is 1.15 ha.

The feature is so named because of its shape supposedly resembling a mussel ('mida' in Bulgarian), and in association with other descriptive names of islands in the area.

== Location ==
Mida Island is located 2.9 km south of Host Island, 5.5 km northwest of Zherav Island, and 4.9 km northeast of Kalmar Island in the Dannebrog Islands group. British mapping in 2001.

== Maps ==
- British Admiralty Nautical Chart 446 Anvers Island to Renaud Island. Scale 1:150000. Admiralty, UK Hydrographic Office, 2001
- Brabant Island to Argentine Islands. Scale 1:250000 topographic map. British Antarctic Survey, 2008
- Antarctic Digital Database (ADD). Scale 1:250000 topographic map of Antarctica. Scientific Committee on Antarctic Research (SCAR). Since 1993, regularly upgraded and updated

== See also ==
- List of Antarctic and subantarctic islands
