= Yato Rocks =

Antarctic island

- Location within Antarctica Location within Antarctic Peninsula

Geography
- Location: Antarctica
- Coordinates: 64°58′05″S 64°00′15″W
- Archipelago: Wilhelm Archipelago
- Area: 25 ha (62 acres)
- Length: 780 m (2560 ft)
- Width: 560 m (1840 ft)

Administration
- Administered under the Antarctic Treaty System

Demographics
- Population: uninhabited

Yato Rocks (Bulgarian: скали Ято, romanized: skali Yato, IPA: [skɐˈli ˈjato]) is the group of rocks lying in an aquatory of 25 ha that extends 780 m in west–east direction and 560 m in south–north direction in the Wauwermans Islands group of Wilhelm Archipelago in the Antarctic Peninsula region. Their surface area is 25 ha.

The feature is so named because of its shape supposedly resembling a flock of birds in flight, 'yato' being the Bulgarian for 'bird flock', and in association with other descriptive names of islands in the area.

== Location ==
Yato Rocks are centred at 64°58′05″S 64°00′15″W, which is 5.27 km south of Host Island, 4.93 km west of Zherav Island, 2.11 km south of the midpoint of Vetrilo Rocks, and 3 km northeast of Kalmar Island in the Dannebrog Islands group. British mapping in 2001.

== Maps ==
- British Admiralty Nautical Chart 446 Anvers Island to Renaud Island. Scale 1:150000. Admiralty, UK Hydrographic Office, 2001
- Brabant Island to Argentine Islands. Scale 1:250000 topographic map. British Antarctic Survey, 2008
- Antarctic Digital Database (ADD). Scale 1:250000 topographic map of Antarctica. Scientific Committee on Antarctic Research (SCAR). Since 1993, regularly upgraded and updated

== See also ==
- List of Antarctic and subantarctic islands
