= Akula Island =

Island in Wilhelm Archipelago, Antarctica

- Location within Antarctica Location within Antarctic Peninsula

Geography
- Location: Antarctica
- Coordinates: 65°04′20″S 64°06′38″W
- Archipelago: Wilhelm Archipelago
- Area: 15.46 ha (38.2 acres)
- Length: 915 m (3002 ft)
- Width: 274 m (899 ft)

Administration
- Administered under the Antarctic Treaty System

Demographics
- Population: uninhabited

Akula Island (Bulgarian: остров Акула, romanized: ostrov Akula, IPA: [ˈɔstrof ɐˈkuɫɐ]) is the mostly ice-covered island 915 m long in west–east direction and 274 m wide in the Dannebrog Islands group of Wilhelm Archipelago in the Antarctic Peninsula region. Its surface area is 15.46 ha.

The feature is so named because of its shape supposedly resembling a shark ('akula' in Bulgarian), and in association with other descriptive names of islands in the area.

== Location ==
Akula Island is located at 65°04′20″S 64°06′38″W, which is 46 m north of Elisabethinsel, 100 m southeast of Stego Island, 480 m south of Spatnik Island and 2.43 km west-southwest of the west extremity of Booth Island. British mapping in 2001.

== Maps ==
- British Admiralty Nautical Chart 446 Anvers Island to Renaud Island. Scale 1:150000. Admiralty, UK Hydrographic Office, 2001
- Brabant Island to Argentine Islands. Scale 1:250000 topographic map. British Antarctic Survey, 2008
- Antarctic Digital Database. Scale 1:250000 topographic map of Antarctica. Scientific Committee on Antarctic Research (SCAR). Since 1993, regularly upgraded and updated

== See also ==
- List of Antarctic and subantarctic islands
