= Mechka Island =

Antarctic island

- Location within Antarctica Location within Antarctic Peninsula

Geography
- Location: Antarctica
- Coordinates: 65°00′17″S 64°00′10″W
- Archipelago: Wilhelm Archipelago
- Area: 15.9 ha (39 acres)
- Length: 875 m (2871 ft)
- Width: 350 m (1150 ft)

Administration
- Administered under the Antarctic Treaty System

Demographics
- Population: uninhabited

Mechka Island (Bulgarian: остров Мечка, romanized: ostrov Mechka, IPA: [ˈɔstrof ˈmɛt͡ʃkɐ]) is the mostly ice-covered island extending 875 m in southwest–northeast direction and 350 m in south–north direction in the Dannebrog Islands group of Wilhelm Archipelago in the Antarctic Peninsula region. Its surface area is 15.9 ha.

The feature is so named because of its shape supposedly resembling a bear ('mechka' in Bulgarian), and in association with other descriptive names of islands in the area.

== Location ==
Mechka Island is located at 65°00′17″S 64°00′10″W, which is 4.96 km north-northwest of Booth Island, 3.12 km northeast of Raketa Island, 50 m south of Mishka Island, and 5.6 km southwest of Kril Island in the Wauwermans Islands group. British mapping in 2001.

== Maps ==
- British Admiralty Nautical Chart 446 Anvers Island to Renaud Island. Scale 1:150000. Admiralty, UK Hydrographic Office, 2001
- Brabant Island to Argentine Islands. Scale 1:250000 topographic map. British Antarctic Survey, 2008
- Antarctic Digital Database (ADD). Scale 1:250000 topographic map of Antarctica. Scientific Committee on Antarctic Research (SCAR). Since 1993, regularly upgraded and updated

== See also ==
- List of Antarctic and subantarctic islands
