= Tsankov Island =

Antarctic island

- Location within Antarctica Location within Antarctic Peninsula

Geography
- Location: Antarctica
- Coordinates: 65°03′58″S 64°08′38″W
- Archipelago: Wilhelm Archipelago
- Area: 9.48 ha (23.4 acres)
- Length: 625 m (2051 ft)
- Width: 216 m (709 ft)

Administration
- Administered under the Antarctic Treaty System

Demographics
- Population: uninhabited

Tsankov Island (Bulgarian: Цанков остров, romanized: Tsankov ostrov, IPA: [t͡sɐnˈkɔf ˈɔstrof]) is the mostly ice-covered island 625 m long in west-southwest to west-northeast direction and 216 m wide in the Dannebrog Islands group of Wilhelm Archipelago in the Antarctic Peninsula region. Its surface area is 9.48 ha.

The feature is named after the dermatologist Nikolay Tsankov, participant in the 2010/11 and subsequent Bulgarian Antarctic campaigns.

== Location ==
Tsankov Island is located at 65°03′58″S 64°08′38″W, which is 293 m northwest of Stego Island, 175 m east of Bodloperka Island, 1.18 km southeast of Sprey Island and 1.25 km west-southwest of Taralezh Island. British mapping in 2001.

== Maps ==
- British Admiralty Nautical Chart 446 Anvers Island to Renaud Island. Scale 1:150000. Admiralty, UK Hydrographic Office, 2001
- Brabant Island to Argentine Islands. Scale 1:250000 topographic map. British Antarctic Survey, 2008
- Antarctic Digital Database (ADD). Scale 1:250000 topographic map of Antarctica. Scientific Committee on Antarctic Research (SCAR). Since 1993, regularly upgraded and updated

== See also ==
- List of Antarctic and subantarctic islands
