= Kostilka Island =

Antarctic island

- Location within Antarctica Location within Antarctic Peninsula

Geography
- Location: Antarctica
- Coordinates: 65°05′57″S 64°24′52″W
- Archipelago: Wilhelm Archipelago
- Area: 1.64 ha (4.1 acres)
- Length: 213 m (699 ft)
- Width: 137 m (449 ft)

Administration
- Administered under the Antarctic Treaty System

Demographics
- Population: uninhabited

Kostilka Island (Bulgarian: остров Костилка, romanized: ostrov Kostilka, IPA: [ˈɔstrof kosˈtiɫkɐ]) is the rocky island 213 m long in west–east direction and 137 m wide in the Myriad Islands group of Wilhelm Archipelago in the Antarctic Peninsula region. Its surface area is 1.64 ha.

The feature is so named because of its shape supposedly resembling a fruit's stone ('kostilka' in Bulgarian), and in association with other descriptive names of islands in the area.

== Location ==
Kostilka Island is located at 65°05′57″S 64°24′52″W, which is 3.35 km northwest of Flank Island, 3.47 km southeast of Final Island, and 6.74 km west-northwest of Vedel Islands. British mapping in 2001.

== Maps ==
- British Admiralty Nautical Chart 446 Anvers Island to Renaud Island. Scale 1:150000. Admiralty, UK Hydrographic Office, 2001
- Brabant Island to Argentine Islands. Scale 1:250000 topographic map. British Antarctic Survey, 2008
- Antarctic Digital Database (ADD). Scale 1:250000 topographic map of Antarctica. Scientific Committee on Antarctic Research (SCAR). Since 1993, regularly upgraded and updated

== See also ==
- List of Antarctic and subantarctic islands
