= Mishka Island =

Antarctic island

- Location within Antarctica Location within Antarctic Peninsula

Geography
- Location: Antarctica
- Coordinates: 65°00′07″S 64°00′14″W
- Archipelago: Wilhelm Archipelago
- Area: 9.9 ha (24 acres)
- Length: 751 m (2464 ft)
- Width: 220 m (720 ft)

Administration
- Administered under the Antarctic Treaty System

Demographics
- Population: uninhabited

Mishka Island (Bulgarian: остров Мишка, romanized: ostrov Mishka, IPA: [ˈɔstrof ˈmiʃkɐ]) is the mostly ice-covered island 751 m long in west–east direction and 220 m wide in the Dannebrog Islands group of Wilhelm Archipelago in the Antarctic Peninsula region. Its surface area is 9.9 ha.

The feature is so named because of its shape supposedly resembling a mouse ('mishka' in Bulgarian), and in association with other descriptive names of islands in the area.

== Location ==
Mishka Island is located 5.32 km north-northwest of Booth Island, 50 m north of Mechka Island, 3.4 km northeast of Raketa Island, 896 m east-southeast of Kosatka Island, and 5.55 km southwest of Kril Island in the Wauwermans Islands group. British mapping in 2001.

== Maps ==
- British Admiralty Nautical Chart 446 Anvers Island to Renaud Island. Scale 1:150000. Admiralty, UK Hydrographic Office, 2001
- Brabant Island to Argentine Islands. Scale 1:250000 topographic map. British Antarctic Survey, 2008
- Antarctic Digital Database (ADD). Scale 1:250000 topographic map of Antarctica. Scientific Committee on Antarctic Research (SCAR). Since 1993, regularly upgraded and updated

== See also ==
- List of Antarctic and subantarctic islands
