= Vetrilo Rocks =

Antarctic island

- Location within Antarctica Location within Antarctic Peninsula

Geography
- Location: Antarctica
- Coordinates: 64°56′57″S 64°00′26″W
- Archipelago: Wilhelm Archipelago
- Area: 27 ha (67 acres)
- Length: 970 m (3180 ft)
- Width: 485 m (1591 ft)

Administration
- Administered under the Antarctic Treaty System

Demographics
- Population: uninhabited

Vetrilo Rocks (Bulgarian: скали Ветрило, romanized: skali Vetrilo, IPA: [skɐˈli vɛˈtriɫo]) is the group of rocks lying in an aquatory of 27 ha that extends 970 m in west-southwest to east-northeast direction and 485 m in south-southeast to north-northwest direction in the Wauwermans Islands group of Wilhelm Archipelago in the Antarctic Peninsula region. Their surface area is 27 ha.

The feature is so named because of its shape supposedly resembling a hand fan ('vetrilo' in Bulgarian), and in association with other descriptive names of islands in the area.

== Location ==
Vetrilo Rocks are centred at 64°56′57″S 64°00′26″W, which is 3.18 km south of Host Island, 5.55 km west-northwest of Zherav Island, 2.11 km north of the midpoint of Yato Rocks, and 4.7 km northeast of Kalmar Island in the Dannebrog Islands group. British mapping in 2001.

== Maps ==
- British Admiralty Nautical Chart 446 Anvers Island to Renaud Island. Scale 1:150000. Admiralty, UK Hydrographic Office, 2001
- Brabant Island to Argentine Islands. Scale 1:250000 topographic map. British Antarctic Survey, 2008
- Antarctic Digital Database (ADD). Scale 1:250000 topographic map of Antarctica. Scientific Committee on Antarctic Research (SCAR). Since 1993, regularly upgraded and updated

== See also ==
- List of Antarctic and subantarctic islands
