= Bodloperka Island =

Antarctic island

- Location within Antarctica Location within Antarctic Peninsula

Geography
- Location: Antarctica
- Coordinates: 65°04′04″S 64°09′32″W
- Archipelago: Wilhelm Archipelago
- Area: 22.43 ha (55.4 acres)
- Length: 688 m (2257 ft)
- Width: 473 m (1552 ft)

Administration
- Administered under the Antarctic Treaty System

Demographics
- Population: uninhabited

Bodloperka Island (Bulgarian: остров Бодлоперка, romanized: ostrov Bodloperka, IPA: [ˈɔstrov bodloˈpɛrkɐ]) is the partly ice-free island 688 m long in south-southwest to north-northeast direction and 473 m wide in the Dannebrog Islands group of Wilhelm Archipelago in the Antarctic Peninsula region. Its surface area is 22.43 ha.

The feature is so named because of its shape supposedly resembling an emperor angelfish ('bodloperka' in Bulgarian), and in association with other descriptive names of islands in the area.

== Location ==
Bodloperka Island is located at 65°04′04″S 64°09′32″W, which is 650 m northwest of Stego Island, 2.3 km east-southeast of Skoba Island, 640 m south-southeast of Sprey Island and 175 m west of Tsankov Island. British mapping in 2001.

== Maps ==
- British Admiralty Nautical Chart 446 Anvers Island to Renaud Island. Scale 1:150000. Admiralty, UK Hydrographic Office, 2001
- Brabant Island to Argentine Islands. Scale 1:250000 topographic map. British Antarctic Survey, 2008
- Antarctic Digital Database (ADD). Scale 1:250000 topographic map of Antarctica. Scientific Committee on Antarctic Research (SCAR). Since 1993, regularly upgraded and updated

== See also ==
- List of Antarctic and subantarctic islands
