= Zherav Island =

Antarctic island

- Location within Antarctica Location within Antarctic Peninsula

Geography
- Location: Antarctica
- Coordinates: 64°58′01″S 63°52′54″W
- Archipelago: Wilhelm Archipelago
- Area: 29.55 ha (73.0 acres)
- Length: 1.71 km (1.063 mi)
- Width: 377 m (1237 ft)

Administration
- Administered under the Antarctic Treaty System

Demographics
- Population: uninhabited

Zherav Island (Bulgarian: остров Жерав, romanized: ostrov Zherav, IPA: [ˈɔstrof ˈʒɛrɐf]) is a mostly ice-covered island in the Wauwermans Islands group of Wilhelm Archipelago in the Antarctic Peninsula region. It is 1.71 km long (measured west-southwest to east-northeast) and 377 m wide; its surface area is 29.55 ha.

Zherav Island is so named because of its shape supposedly resembling a common crane in flight ('zherav' is the Bulgarian for that bird) and in association with other descriptive names of islands in the area.

== Location ==
According to British mapping in 2001, Zherav Island is located at 64°58′23″S 63°52′58″W, which is 3.55 km south-southeast of Host Island, 4 km west of Brown Island, 194 m north of Kril Island, 7.19 km north-northwest of False Cape Renard on Graham Land, and 5.74 km northeast of Mishka Island in the Dannebrog Islands group.

== Maps ==
- British Admiralty Nautical Chart 446 Anvers Island to Renaud Island. Scale 1:150000. Admiralty, UK Hydrographic Office, 2001
- Brabant Island to Argentine Islands. Scale 1:250000 topographic map. British Antarctic Survey, 2008
- Antarctic Digital Database (ADD). Scale 1:250000 topographic map of Antarctica. Scientific Committee on Antarctic Research (SCAR). Since 1993, regularly upgraded and updated

== See also ==
- List of Antarctic and subantarctic islands
