= Greblo Island =

Antarctic island

- Location within Antarctica Location within Antarctic Peninsula

Geography
- Location: Antarctica
- Coordinates: 65°01′41.5″S 64°03′40″W
- Archipelago: Wilhelm Archipelago
- Area: 4.7 ha (12 acres)
- Length: 763 m (2503 ft)
- Width: 95 m (312 ft)

Administration
- Administered under the Antarctic Treaty System

Demographics
- Population: uninhabited

Greblo Island (Bulgarian: остров Гребло, romanized: ostrov Greblo, IPA: [ˈɔstrof grɛˈblɔ]) is the mostly ice-covered island 763 km long in west–east direction and 95 m wide in the Dannebrog Islands group of Wilhelm Archipelago in the Antarctic Peninsula region. Its surface area is 4.7 ha.

The feature is so named because of its shape supposedly resembling an oarfish ('greblo' being the Bulgarian for 'oar'), and in association with other descriptive names of islands in the area.

== Location ==
Greblo Island is located at 65°01′41.5″S 64°03′40″W, which is 3.94 km north by west of the west extremity of Booth Island, 509 m east-southeast of Meduza Island, 25 m south of Raketa Island and 1.46 km northwest of Rollet Island. British mapping in 2001.

== Maps ==
- British Admiralty Nautical Chart 446 Anvers Island to Renaud Island. Scale 1:150000. Admiralty, UK Hydrographic Office, 2001
- Brabant Island to Argentine Islands. Scale 1:250000 topographic map. British Antarctic Survey, 2008
- Antarctic Digital Database (ADD). Scale 1:250000 topographic map of Antarctica. Scientific Committee on Antarctic Research (SCAR). Since 1993, regularly upgraded and updated

== See also ==
- List of Antarctic and subantarctic islands
