= Padpadak Island =

Antarctic island

- Location within Antarctica Location within Antarctic Peninsula

Geography
- Location: Antarctica
- Coordinates: 65°03′12″S 64°10′17″W
- Archipelago: Wilhelm Archipelago
- Area: 8.35 ha (20.6 acres)
- Length: 442 m (1450 ft)
- Width: 390 m (1280 ft)

Administration
- Administered under the Antarctic Treaty System

Demographics
- Population: uninhabited

Padpadak Island (Bulgarian: остров Пъдпъдък, romanized: ostrov Padpadak, IPA: [ˈɔstrof pɤdpɤˈdɤk]) is the mostly ice-free island extending 442 m in southwest–northeast direction and 390 m in southeast–northwest direction in the Dannebrog Islands group of Wilhelm Archipelago in the Antarctic Peninsula region. Its surface area is 8.35 ha.

The feature is so named because of its shape supposedly resembling a common quail bird ('padpadak' in Bulgarian), and in association with other descriptive names of islands in the area.

== Location ==
Padpadak Island is located at 65°03′12″S 64°10′17″W. It abuts Shut Island on the northeast, and is situated 62 m northwest of Sprey Island and 1.62 km east-northeast of Skoba Island. British mapping in 2001.

== Maps ==
- British Admiralty Nautical Chart 446 Anvers Island to Renaud Island. Scale 1:150000. Admiralty, UK Hydrographic Office, 2001
- Brabant Island to Argentine Islands. Scale 1:250000 topographic map. British Antarctic Survey, 2008
- Antarctic Digital Database (ADD). Scale 1:250000 topographic map of Antarctica. Scientific Committee on Antarctic Research (SCAR). Since 1993, regularly upgraded and updated

== See also ==
- List of Antarctic and subantarctic islands
