= Rog Island =

Antarctic island

- Location within Antarctica Location within Antarctic Peninsula

Geography
- Location: Antarctica
- Coordinates: 65°02′58″S 64°02′45″W
- Archipelago: Wilhelm Archipelago
- Area: 5.06 ha (12.5 acres)
- Length: 557 m (1827 ft)
- Width: 208 m (682 ft)

Administration
- Administered under the Antarctic Treaty System

Demographics
- Population: uninhabited

Rog Island (Bulgarian: остров Рог, romanized: ostrov Rog, IPA: [ˈɔstrof ˈrɔk]) is the partly ice-free island 557 m long in west–east direction and 208 m wide in the Dannebrog Islands group of Wilhelm Archipelago in the Antarctic Peninsula region. Its surface area is 5.06 ha.

The feature is so named because of its shape supposedly resembling an animal horn ('rog' in Bulgarian), and in association with other descriptive names of islands in the area.

== Location ==
Rog Island is located at 65°02′58″S 64°02′45″W, which is 1.47 km north of the west extremity of Booth Island, 653 m east of Revolver Island and 461 m south of Rollet Island. British mapping in 2001.

== Maps ==
- British Admiralty Nautical Chart 446 Anvers Island to Renaud Island. Scale 1:150000. Admiralty, UK Hydrographic Office, 2001
- Brabant Island to Argentine Islands. Scale 1:250000 topographic map. British Antarctic Survey, 2008
- Antarctic Digital Database (ADD). Scale 1:250000 topographic map of Antarctica. Scientific Committee on Antarctic Research (SCAR). Since 1993, regularly upgraded and updated

== See also ==
- List of Antarctic and subantarctic islands
