= Lamya Island =

Antarctic island

- Location within Antarctica Location within Antarctic Peninsula

Geography
- Location: Antarctica
- Coordinates: 65°05′03″S 64°06′43″W
- Archipelago: Wilhelm Archipelago
- Area: 45.72 ha (113.0 acres)
- Length: 1.56 km (0.969 mi)
- Width: 630 m (2070 ft)

Administration
- Administered under the Antarctic Treaty System

Demographics
- Population: uninhabited

Lamya Island (Bulgarian: остров Ламя, romanized: ostrov Lamya, IPA: [ˈɔstrof ɫɐˈmʲa]) is the partly ice-free island 1.56 km long in west–east direction and 630 m wide in the Dannebrog Islands group of Wilhelm Archipelago in the Antarctic Peninsula region. Its surface area is 45.72 ha.

The feature is so named because of its shape supposedly resembling a lamya, monster creature in Bulgarian mythology, and in association with other descriptive names of islands in the area.

== Location ==
Lamya Island is located at 65°05′03″S 64°06′43″W, which is 85 m south of Elisabethinsel, 2.76 km southwest of the west extremity of Booth Island and 2.33 km north of Peperuda Island. British mapping in 2001.

== Maps ==
- British Admiralty Nautical Chart 446 Anvers Island to Renaud Island. Scale 1:150000. Admiralty, UK Hydrographic Office, 2001
- Brabant Island to Argentine Islands. Scale 1:250000 topographic map. British Antarctic Survey, 2008
- Antarctic Digital Database (ADD). Scale 1:250000 topographic map of Antarctica. Scientific Committee on Antarctic Research (SCAR). Since 1993, regularly upgraded and updated

== See also ==
- List of Antarctic and subantarctic islands
