= Sinclair Island (Antarctica) =

Island in the Wilhelm Archipelago, Antarctica

- Location within Antarctica

Geography
- Location: Antarctica
- Coordinates: 64°55′S 63°53′W
- Archipelago: Wauwermans Islands, Wilhelm Archipelago

Administration
- Administered under the Antarctic Treaty System

Demographics
- Population: Uninhabited

Sinclair Island (also known as Chaucer Island in UK usage) is a small island over 1.9 kilometres (1 nmi) long in the Wauwermans Islands group of the Wilhelm Archipelago, off the west coast of the Antarctic Peninsula. It lies about 2.8 kilometres (1.5 nmi) northeast of Reeve Island.

The island, one of the Wauwermans Islands in the Bismarck Strait, was roughly charted by Argentine hydrographic work around the early 1950s and initially labelled Isla Alberto on national charts. It was later renamed Isla Sinclair by Argentine authorities in honour of naval officer Enrique Sinclair (Henry Sinclair, 1805–1904), a New York–born seaman who served for many years in the Argentine Navy. In 1956 the Argentine Geographic Coordinating Committee approved the toponym "Sinclair", while in 1959 the United Kingdom Antarctic Place-Names Committee recommended the English name Chaucer Island in recognition of the poet Geoffrey Chaucer, following the convention of using names from The Canterbury Tales for features in the area.

The island is uninhabited and, like all land areas south of 60°S, falls within the region to which the Antarctic Treaty System applies.

== See also ==
- List of Antarctic and sub-Antarctic islands
