= Hoatsin Island =

Antarctic island

- Location within Antarctica Location within Antarctic Peninsula

Geography
- Location: Antarctica
- Coordinates: 65°02′22″S 64°09′07″W
- Archipelago: Wilhelm Archipelago
- Area: 16.85 ha (41.6 acres)
- Length: 795 m (2608 ft)
- Width: 360 m (1180 ft)

Administration
- Administered under the Antarctic Treaty System

Demographics
- Population: uninhabited

Hoatsin Island (Bulgarian: остров Хоацин, romanized: ostrov Hoatsin, IPA: [ˈɔstrof hoɐˈt͡sin]) is the mostly ice-free island 795 m long in southeast–northwest direction and 360 m wide in the Dannebrog Islands group of Wilhelm Archipelago in the Antarctic Peninsula region. Its surface area is 16.85 ha.

The feature is so named because of its shape supposedly resembling a hoatzin bird ('hoatsin' in Bulgarian), and in association with other descriptive names of islands in the area.

== Location ==
Hoatsin Island is located at 65°02′22″S 64°09′07″W, which is 65 m southwest of Pegas Island, 2.8 km northwest of Taralezh Island and 815 m north-northeast of Shut Island. British mapping in 2001.

== Maps ==
- British Admiralty Nautical Chart 446 Anvers Island to Renaud Island. Scale 1:150000. Admiralty, UK Hydrographic Office, 2001
- Brabant Island to Argentine Islands. Scale 1:250000 topographic map. British Antarctic Survey, 2008
- Antarctic Digital Database (ADD). Scale 1:250000 topographic map of Antarctica. Scientific Committee on Antarctic Research (SCAR). Since 1993, regularly upgraded and updated

== See also ==
- List of Antarctic and subantarctic islands
