= Spatnik Island =

Island of the Wilhelm Archipelago, Antarctica

- Location within Antarctica Location within Antarctic Peninsula

Geography
- Location: Antarctica
- Coordinates: 65°03′55″S 64°06′28″W
- Archipelago: Wilhelm Archipelago
- Area: 6.62 ha (16.4 acres)
- Length: 485 m (1591 ft)
- Width: 290 m (950 ft)

Administration
- Administered under the Antarctic Treaty System

Demographics
- Population: uninhabited

Spatnik Island (Bulgarian: остров Спътник, romanized: ostrov Spatnik, IPA: [ˈɔstrof ˈspɤtnik]) is the partly ice-free island 485 m long in west–east direction and 290 m wide in the Dannebrog Islands group of Wilhelm Archipelago in the Antarctic Peninsula region. Its surface area is 6.62 ha.

The feature is so named because of its shape supposedly resembling a communications satellite ('spatnik' in Bulgarian), and in association with other descriptive names of islands in the area.

== Location ==
Spatnik Island is located at 65°03′55″S 64°06′28″W, which is 240 m northeast of Stego Island, 45 m south of Taralezh Island and 2.47 km west of the west extremity of Booth Island. British mapping in 2001.

== Maps ==
- British Admiralty Nautical Chart 446 Anvers Island to Renaud Island. Scale 1:150000. Admiralty, UK Hydrographic Office, 2001
- Brabant Island to Argentine Islands. Scale 1:250000 topographic map. British Antarctic Survey, 2008
- Antarctic Digital Database (ADD). Scale 1:250000 topographic map of Antarctica. Scientific Committee on Antarctic Research (SCAR). Since 1993, regularly upgraded and updated

== See also ==
- List of Antarctic and subantarctic islands
