= Heed Rock =

Heed Rock (64°59′S 63°47′W) is a very small rock, awash at high water and virtually hidden from sight, lying 1 nautical mile (2 km) south of Brown Island in the Wauwermans Islands in the Wilhelm Archipelago, Antarctica. It was shown on an Argentine government chart of 1950, but not named. It was surveyed by the British Naval Hydrographic Survey Unit in 1956–57, and so named by the UK Antarctic Place-Names Committee as a caution to mariners.
