= Lamantin Island =

Antarctic island

- Location within Antarctica Location within Antarctic Peninsula

Geography
- Location: Antarctica
- Coordinates: 65°01′21″S 64°07′56″W
- Archipelago: Wilhelm Archipelago
- Area: 15.8 ha (39 acres)
- Length: 812 m (2664 ft)
- Width: 318 m (1043 ft)

Administration
- Administered under the Antarctic Treaty System

Demographics
- Population: uninhabited

Lamantin Island (Bulgarian: остров Ламантин, romanized: ostrov Lamantin, IPA: [ˈɔstrof lɐmɐnˈtin]) is the partly ice-free island 812 m long in southwest–northeast direction and 318 m wide in the Dannebrog Islands group of Wilhelm Archipelago in the Antarctic Peninsula region. Its surface area is 15.8 ha.

The feature is so named because of its shape supposedly resembling a manatee ('lamantin' in Bulgarian), and in association with other descriptive names of islands in the area.

== Location ==
Lamantin Island is located at 65°01′21″S 64°07′56″W, which is 135 m southwest of Tyulen Island, 1.66 km west-northwest of Meduza Island and 478 m northwest of Yastreb Island. British mapping in 2001.

== Maps ==
- British Admiralty Nautical Chart 446 Anvers Island to Renaud Island. Scale 1:150000. Admiralty, UK Hydrographic Office, 2001
- Brabant Island to Argentine Islands. Scale 1:250000 topographic map. British Antarctic Survey, 2008
- Antarctic Digital Database (ADD). Scale 1:250000 topographic map of Antarctica. Scientific Committee on Antarctic Research (SCAR). Since 1993, regularly upgraded and updated

== See also ==
- List of Antarctic and subantarctic islands
