= Tigan Island =

Antarctic island

- Location within Antarctica Location within Antarctic Peninsula

Geography
- Location: Antarctica
- Coordinates: 65°02′00″S 64°08′00″W
- Archipelago: Wilhelm Archipelago
- Area: 10.68 ha (26.4 acres)
- Length: 750 m (2460 ft)
- Width: 226 m (741 ft)

Administration
- Administered under the Antarctic Treaty System

Demographics
- Population: uninhabited

Tigan Island (Bulgarian: остров Тиган, romanized: ostrov Tigan, IPA: [ˈɔstrof tiˈgan]) is the partly ice-free island 750 m long in west–east direction and 226 m wide in the Dannebrog Islands group of Wilhelm Archipelago in the Antarctic Peninsula region. Its surface area is 10.68 ha.

The feature is so named because of its shape supposedly resembling a frying pan ('tigan' in Bulgarian), and in association with other descriptive names of islands in the area.

== Location ==
Tigan Island is located at 65°02′00″S 64°08′00″W. It abuts Pegas Island on the south, and is situated 115 m south of Yastreb Island and 3 km northwest of Revolver Island. British mapping in 2001.

== Maps ==
- British Admiralty Nautical Chart 446 Anvers Island to Renaud Island. Scale 1:150000. Admiralty, UK Hydrographic Office, 2001
- Brabant Island to Argentine Islands. Scale 1:250000 topographic map. British Antarctic Survey, 2008
- Antarctic Digital Database (ADD). Scale 1:250000 topographic map of Antarctica. Scientific Committee on Antarctic Research (SCAR). Since 1993, regularly upgraded and updated

== See also ==
- List of Antarctic and subantarctic islands
