= Tyulen Island =

Antarctic island

- Location within Antarctica Location within Antarctic Peninsula

Geography
- Location: Antarctica
- Coordinates: 65°01′03″S 64°07′05″W
- Archipelago: Wilhelm Archipelago
- Area: 26.78 ha (66.2 acres)
- Length: 1 km (0.6 mi)
- Width: 530 m (1740 ft)

Administration
- Administered under the Antarctic Treaty System

Demographics
- Population: uninhabited

Tyulen Island (Bulgarian: остров Тюлен, romanized: ostrov Tyulen, IPA: [ˈɔstrof tʲuˈlɛn]) is the mostly ice-covered island 1 km long in west-southwest to east-northeast direction and 530 m wide in the Dannebrog Islands group of Wilhelm Archipelago in the Antarctic Peninsula region. Its surface area is 26.78 ha.

The feature is so named because of its shape supposedly resembling a fur seal, 'tyulen' being the Bulgarian for 'seal', and in association with other descriptive names of islands in the area.

== Location ==
Tyulen Island is located at 65°01′03″S 64°07′05″W, which is 3.2 km southwest of Kalmar Island, 1.4 km northwest of Meduza Island and 135 m northeast of Lamantin Island. British mapping in 2001.

== Maps ==
- British Admiralty Nautical Chart 446 Anvers Island to Renaud Island. Scale 1:150000. Admiralty, UK Hydrographic Office, 2001
- Brabant Island to Argentine Islands. Scale 1:250000 topographic map. British Antarctic Survey, 2008
- Antarctic Digital Database (ADD). Scale 1:250000 topographic map of Antarctica. Scientific Committee on Antarctic Research (SCAR). Since 1993, regularly upgraded and updated

== See also ==
- List of Antarctic and subantarctic islands
