= Shut Island =

Island of the Wilhelm Archipelago, Antarctica

- Location within Antarctica Location within Antarctic Peninsula

Geography
- Location: Antarctica
- Coordinates: 65°03′00″S 64°10′00″W
- Archipelago: Wilhelm Archipelago
- Area: 14 ha (35 acres)
- Length: 573 m (1880 ft)
- Width: 520 m (1710 ft)

Administration
- Administered under the Antarctic Treaty System

Demographics
- Population: uninhabited

Shut Island (Bulgarian: остров Шут, romanized: ostrov Shut, IPA: [ˈɔstrof ˈʃut]) is the partly ice-free island extending 573 m in west–east direction and 520 m in south–north direction in the Dannebrog Islands group of Wilhelm Archipelago in the Antarctic Peninsula region. Its surface area is 14 ha.

The feature is so named because of its shape supposedly resembling a jester hat ('shut' being the Bulgarian for 'jester'), and in association with other descriptive names of islands in the area.

== Location ==
Shut Island is located at 65°03′00″S 64°10′00″W. It abuts Padpadak Island on the south, and is situated 815m south-southwest of Hoatsin Island, 3.92 km west of Revolver Island and 1.9 km northeast of Skoba Island.

== Maps ==
- British Admiralty Nautical Chart 446 Anvers Island to Renaud Island. Scale 1:150000. Admiralty, UK Hydrographic Office, 2001
- Brabant Island to Argentine Islands. Scale 1:250000 topographic map. British Antarctic Survey, 2008
- Antarctic Digital Database (ADD). Scale 1:250000 topographic map of Antarctica. Scientific Committee on Antarctic Research (SCAR). Since 1993, regularly upgraded and updated

== See also ==
- List of Antarctic and subantarctic islands
