= Squire Island =

Island in Wilhelm Archipelago, Antarctica

- Location within Antarctica

Geography
- Location: Antarctica
- Coordinates: 64°55′S 63°54′W
- Archipelago: Wilhelm Archipelago

Administration
- Administered under the Antarctic Treaty System

Demographics
- Population: Uninhabited

Squire Island is a small island lying immediately northeast of Friar Island in the Wauwermans Islands, in the Wilhelm Archipelago. Shown on an Argentine government chart of 1950. Named by the United Kingdom Antarctic Place-Names Committee (UK-APC) in 1958 after one of the characters in Chaucer's Canterbury Tales.

== See also ==
- List of Antarctic and sub-Antarctic islands
