= Guido Island =

Island in Wilhelm Archipelago, Antarctica

Guido Island (64°55′S 63°50′W) is an island lying 1 nautical mile (2 km) northeast of Prioress Island in the Wauwermans Islands, in the Wilhelm Archipelago, Antarctica. It was shown on an Argentine government chart of 1950; the name "Isla Guido Spano" appears on a 1957 chart and is for Carlos Guido Spano (1829–1918), a famous Argentine poet.

== See also ==
- List of Antarctic and sub-Antarctic islands
