= Kosatka Island =

Antarctic island

- Location within Antarctica Location within Antarctic Peninsula

Geography
- Location: Antarctica
- Coordinates: 64°59′57″S 64°02′06″W
- Archipelago: Wilhelm Archipelago
- Area: 8.86 ha (21.9 acres)
- Length: 653 m (2142 ft)
- Width: 195 m (640 ft)

Administration
- Administered under the Antarctic Treaty System

Demographics
- Population: uninhabited

Kosatka Island (Bulgarian: остров Косатка, romanized: ostrov Kosatka, IPA: [ˈɔstrof koˈsatkɐ]) is the mostly ice-covered island 653 m long in west–east direction and 195 m wide in the Dannebrog Islands group of Wilhelm Archipelago in the Antarctic Peninsula region. Its surface area is 8.86 ha.

The feature is so named because of its shape supposedly resembling a killer whale ('kosatka' in Bulgarian), and in association with other descriptive names of islands in the area.

== Location ==
Kosatka Island is located at 64°59′57″S 64°02′06″W, which is 6.3 km northwest of Booth Island, 3.18 km northeast of Meduza Island, 1.24 km southeast of Kalmar Island, and 7.37 km west of Kril Island in the Wauwermans Islands group. British mapping in 2001.

== Maps ==
- British Admiralty Nautical Chart 446 Anvers Island to Renaud Island. Scale 1:150000. Admiralty, UK Hydrographic Office, 2001
- Brabant Island to Argentine Islands. Scale 1:250000 topographic map. British Antarctic Survey, 2008
- Antarctic Digital Database (ADD). Scale 1:250000 topographic map of Antarctica. Scientific Committee on Antarctic Research (SCAR). Since 1993, regularly upgraded and updated

== See also ==
- List of Antarctic and subantarctic islands
