= Raketa Island =

Antarctic island

- Location within Antarctica Location within Antarctic Peninsula

Geography
- Location: Antarctica
- Coordinates: 65°01′37″S 64°03′41″W
- Archipelago: Wilhelm Archipelago
- Area: 5.18 ha (12.8 acres)
- Length: 511 m (1677 ft)
- Width: 177 m (581 ft)

Administration
- Administered under the Antarctic Treaty System

Demographics
- Population: uninhabited

Raketa Island (Bulgarian: остров Ракета, romanized: ostrov Raketa, IPA: [ˈɔstrof rɐˈkɛtɐ]) is the mostly ice-covered island 511 m long in west–east direction and 177 m wide in the Dannebrog Islands group of Wilhelm Archipelago in the Antarctic Peninsula region. Its surface area is 5.18 ha.

The feature is so named because of its shape supposedly resembling a trailer mounted rocket ('raketa' in Bulgarian), and in association with other descriptive names of islands in the area.

== Location ==
Raketa Island is located at 65°01′37″S 64°03′41″W, which is 4 km north by west of the west extremity of Booth Island, 540 m southeast of Meduza Island, 2.96 km south-southwest of Kosatka Island and 1.61 km northwest of Rollet Island. British mapping in 2001.

== Maps ==
- British Admiralty Nautical Chart 446 Anvers Island to Renaud Island. Scale 1:150000. Admiralty, UK Hydrographic Office, 2001
- Brabant Island to Argentine Islands. Scale 1:250000 topographic map. British Antarctic Survey, 2008
- Antarctic Digital Database (ADD). Scale 1:250000 topographic map of Antarctica. Scientific Committee on Antarctic Research (SCAR). Since 1993, regularly upgraded and updated

== See also ==
- List of Antarctic and subantarctic islands
