= Final Island =

Island in Wilhelm Archipelago, Antarctica

Coordinates: 65°5′S 64°29′W

Final Island is the westernmost of the Myriad Islands, lying 3.5 nautical miles (6 km) northwest of the Snag Rocks in the Wilhelm Archipelago. It was mapped by the Falkland Islands Dependencies Survey from photos taken by Hunting Aerosurveys Ltd in 1956–57 and from the helicopter of HMS Protector in March 1958. It was so named by the UK Antarctic Place-Names Committee because it is the furthest west of the Myriad Islands and the westernmost of all the islands bordering the French Passage.

== See also ==
- List of Antarctic and sub-Antarctic islands
