= Yastreb Island =

Antarctic island

- Location within Antarctica Location within Antarctic Peninsula

Geography
- Location: Antarctica
- Coordinates: 65°01′47″S 64°07′33″W
- Archipelago: Wilhelm Archipelago
- Area: 17.12 ha (42.3 acres)
- Length: 934 m (3064 ft)
- Width: 317 m (1040 ft)

Administration
- Administered under the Antarctic Treaty System

Demographics
- Population: uninhabited

Yastreb Island (Bulgarian: остров Ястреб, romanized: ostrov Yastreb, IPA: [ˈɔstrof ˈjastrɛp]) is the mostly ice-covered island 934 m long in west-southwest to east-northeast direction and 317 m wide in the Dannebrog Islands group of Wilhelm Archipelago in the Antarctic Peninsula region. Its surface area is 17.12 ha.

The feature is so named because of its shape supposedly resembling a hawk ('yastreb' in Bulgarian), and in association with other descriptive names of islands in the area.

== Location ==
Yastreb Island is located at 65°01′47″S 64°07′33″W, which is 478 m southeast of Lamantin Island, 1.26 km west-southwest of Meduza Island and 115 m north of Tigan Island. British mapping in 2001.

== Maps ==
- British Admiralty Nautical Chart 446 Anvers Island to Renaud Island. Scale 1:150000. Admiralty, UK Hydrographic Office, 2001
- Brabant Island to Argentine Islands. Scale 1:250000 topographic map. British Antarctic Survey, 2008
- Antarctic Digital Database (ADD). Scale 1:250000 topographic map of Antarctica. Scientific Committee on Antarctic Research (SCAR). Since 1993, regularly upgraded and updated

== See also ==
- List of Antarctic and subantarctic islands
