= Peperuda Island =

Antarctic island

- Location within Antarctica Location within Antarctic Peninsula

Geography
- Location: Antarctica
- Coordinates: 65°06′24″S 64°05′00″W
- Archipelago: Wilhelm Archipelago
- Area: 9.51 ha (23.5 acres)
- Length: 592 m (1942 ft)
- Width: 309 m (1014 ft)

Administration
- Administered under the Antarctic Treaty System

Demographics
- Population: uninhabited

Peperuda Island (Bulgarian: остров Пеперуда, romanized: ostrov Peperuda, IPA: [ˈɔstrof pɛpɛˈrudɐ]) is the mostly ice-free island 592 m long in west-southwest to east-northeast direction and 309 m wide in the Wilhelm Archipelago, Antarctic Peninsula region. Its surface area is 9.51 ha.

The feature is so named because of its shape supposedly resembling a butterfly ('peperuda' in Bulgarian), and in association with other descriptive names of islands in the area.

== Location ==
Peperuda Island is located at 65°06′24″S 64°05′00″W, which is 25 m north of Hovgaard Island, 150 m west of Pléneau Island, and 2.33 km south of Lamya Island in the Dannebrog Islands group. British mapping in 2001.

== Maps ==
- British Admiralty Nautical Chart 446 Anvers Island to Renaud Island. Scale 1:150000. Admiralty, UK Hydrographic Office, 2001
- Brabant Island to Argentine Islands. Scale 1:250000 topographic map. British Antarctic Survey, 2008
- Antarctic Digital Database (ADD). Scale 1:250000 topographic map of Antarctica. Scientific Committee on Antarctic Research (SCAR). Since 1993, regularly upgraded and updated

== See also ==
- List of Antarctic and subantarctic islands
