= Pegas Island =

Antarctic island

- Location within Antarctica Location within Antarctic Peninsula

Geography
- Location: Antarctica
- Coordinates: 65°02′12″S 64°08′20″W
- Archipelago: Wilhelm Archipelago
- Area: 29.21 ha (72.2 acres)
- Length: 987 m (3238 ft)
- Width: 703 m (2306 ft)

Administration
- Administered under the Antarctic Treaty System

Demographics
- Population: uninhabited

Pegas Island (Bulgarian: остров Пегас, romanized: ostrov Pegas, IPA: [ˈɔstrof pɛˈgas]) is the partly ice-free island 987 m long in west-southwest to east-northeast direction and 703 m wide in the Dannebrog Islands group of Wilhelm Archipelago in the Antarctic Peninsula region. Its surface area is 29.21 ha.

The feature is named after Pegasus, the winged divine horse in Greek mythology, because of the island's shape supposedly resembling a winged horse, and in association with other descriptive names of islands in the area.

== Location ==
Pegas Island is located at 65°02′12″S 64°08′20″W. It abuts Tigan Island on the north, and is situated 2.95 km northwest of Revolver Island and 65 m northeast of Hoatsin Island. British mapping in 2001.

== Maps ==
- British Admiralty Nautical Chart 446 Anvers Island to Renaud Island. Scale 1:150000. Admiralty, UK Hydrographic Office, 2001
- Brabant Island to Argentine Islands. Scale 1:250000 topographic map. British Antarctic Survey, 2008
- Antarctic Digital Database (ADD). Scale 1:250000 topographic map of Antarctica. Scientific Committee on Antarctic Research (SCAR). Since 1993, regularly upgraded and updated

== See also ==
- List of Antarctic and subantarctic islands
