= Prioress Island =

Island in Wilhelm Archipelago, Antarctica

Prioress Island (64°56′S 63°53′W) is a narrow island lying 0.5 nautical miles (0.9 km) east of Host Island in the Wauwermans Islands, in the Wilhelm Archipelago. Shown on an Argentine government chart of 1954. Named by the United Kingdom Antarctic Place-Names Committee (UK-APC) in 1958 after one of the characters in Geoffrey Chaucer's Canterbury Tales.

== See also ==
- List of Antarctic and sub-Antarctic islands
