= Skoba Island =

Island of the Wilhelm Archipelago, Antarctica

- Location within Antarctica Location within Antarctic Peninsula

Geography
- Location: Antarctica
- Coordinates: 65°03′33″S 64°12′37″W
- Archipelago: Wilhelm Archipelago
- Area: 2.8 ha (6.9 acres)
- Length: 416 m (1365 ft)
- Width: 176 m (577 ft)

Administration
- Administered under the Antarctic Treaty System

Demographics
- Population: uninhabited

Skoba Island (Bulgarian: остров Скоба, romanized: ostrov Skoba, IPA: [ˈɔstrof ˈskɔbɐ]) comprises four abutting rocky islets 416 m long in south–north direction and 176 m wide in the Dannebrog Islands group of Wilhelm Archipelago in the Antarctic Peninsula region. Its surface area is 2.8 ha.

The feature is so named because of its shape supposedly resembling a bracket symbol ('skoba' in Bulgarian), and in association with other descriptive names of islands in the area.

== Location ==
Skoba Island is located at 65°03′33″S 64°12′37″W, which is 1.64 km west of Sprey Island, 6 km north of Lapa Island in the Vedel Islands group, and 9.3 km northeast of Flank Island in the Myriad Islands group. British mapping in 2001.

== Maps ==
- British Admiralty Nautical Chart 446 Anvers Island to Renaud Island. Scale 1:150000. Admiralty, UK Hydrographic Office, 2001
- Brabant Island to Argentine Islands. Scale 1:250000 topographic map. British Antarctic Survey, 2008
- Antarctic Digital Database (ADD). Scale 1:250000 topographic map of Antarctica. Scientific Committee on Antarctic Research (SCAR). Since 1993, regularly upgraded and updated

== See also ==
- List of Antarctic and subantarctic islands
