= Lobel Island =

Island in Wilhelm Archipelago, Antarctica

Lobel Island (64°59′S 63°53′W) is an island nearly 1 nautical mile (1.9 km) long, laying 2 nautical miles (4 km) southwest of Brown Island in the Wauwermans Islands of the Wilhelm Archipelago, Antarctica. It was charted by the Third French Antarctic Expedition under Jean-Baptiste Charcot, 1903–05, and named for Loicq de Lobel.

== See also ==
- List of Antarctic and sub-Antarctic islands
