= Sooty Rock =

Rock in Wilhelm Archipelago, Antarctica

Sooty Rock (65°14′S 65°9′W) is a rock midway between Lumus Rock and Betheder Islands in Wilhelm Archipelago. Discovered and named "Black Reef" by the British Graham Land Expedition (BGLE), 1934–37. Resighted from HMS Endurance in February 1969 and described as a rock about 20 m high. The synonym Sooty was recommended by United Kingdom Antarctic Place-Names Committee (UK-APC) to avoid duplication of the name Black Rock.
