= Manciple Island =

Island in Antarctica

Manciple Island (64°56′S 63°56′W) is an island lying between Reeve Island and Host Island in the Wauwermans Islands, in the Wilhelm Archipelago of Antarctica. It was shown on an Argentine government chart of 1952. The island was named by the UK Antarctic Place-Names Committee in 1958 after the Manciple, one of the characters in Geoffrey Chaucer's The Canterbury Tales.

== See also ==
- List of Antarctic and sub-Antarctic islands
