= Revolver Island =

Antarctic island

- Location within Antarctica Location within Antarctic Peninsula

Geography
- Location: Antarctica
- Coordinates: 65°02′58″S 64°04′21″W
- Archipelago: Wilhelm Archipelago
- Area: 8.77 ha (21.7 acres)
- Length: 645 m (2116 ft)
- Width: 284 m (932 ft)

Administration
- Administered under the Antarctic Treaty System

Demographics
- Population: uninhabited

Revolver Island (Bulgarian: остров Револвер, romanized: ostrov Revolver, IPA: [ˈɔstrof rɛˈvɔɫvɛr]) is the partly ice-free island 645 m long in southwest–northeast direction and 284 m wide in the Dannebrog Islands group of Wilhelm Archipelago in the Antarctic Peninsula region. Its surface area is 8.77 ha.

The feature is so named because of its shape supposedly resembling a revolver handgun, and in association with other descriptive names of islands in the area.

== Location ==
Revolver Island is located at 65°02′58″S 64°04′21″W, which is 1.06 km southwest of Rollet Island, 1.85 km northwest of the west extremity of Booth Island, 1.67 km northeast of Taralezh Island and 2.95 km southeast of Pegas Island. British mapping in 2001.

== Maps ==
- British Admiralty Nautical Chart 446 Anvers Island to Renaud Island. Scale 1:150000. Admiralty, UK Hydrographic Office, 2001
- Brabant Island to Argentine Islands. Scale 1:250000 topographic map. British Antarctic Survey, 2008
- Antarctic Digital Database (ADD). Scale 1:250000 topographic map of Antarctica. Scientific Committee on Antarctic Research (SCAR). Since 1993, regularly upgraded and updated

== See also ==
- List of Antarctic and subantarctic islands
