= Meduza Island =

Antarctic island

- Location within Antarctica Location within Antarctic Peninsula

Geography
- Location: Antarctica
- Coordinates: 65°01′32″S 64°05′05″W
- Archipelago: Wilhelm Archipelago
- Area: 11.9 ha (29 acres)
- Length: 670 m (2200 ft)
- Width: 434 m (1424 ft)

Administration
- Administered under the Antarctic Treaty System

Demographics
- Population: uninhabited

Meduza Island (Bulgarian: остров Медуза, romanized: ostrov Meduza, IPA: [ˈɔstrof mɛˈduzɐ]) is the partly ice-covered island extending 670 m in southwest–northeast direction and 434 m in north–south direction in the Dannebrog Islands group of Wilhelm Archipelago in the Antarctic Peninsula region. Its surface area is 11.9 ha.

The feature is so named because of its shape supposedly resembling a jellyfish ('meduza' in Bulgarian), and in association with other descriptive names of islands in the area.

== Location ==
Meduza Island is located at 65°01′32″S 64°05′05″W, which is 3.18 km southwest of Kosatka Island, 509 m west-northwest of Greblo Island, 2.33 km northwest of Rollet Island, 1.26 km east-northeast of Yastreb Island and 1.4 km southeast of Tyulen Island. British mapping in 2001.

== Maps ==
- British Admiralty Nautical Chart 446 Anvers Island to Renaud Island. Scale 1:150000. Admiralty, UK Hydrographic Office, 2001
- Brabant Island to Argentine Islands. Scale 1:250000 topographic map. British Antarctic Survey, 2008
- Antarctic Digital Database (ADD). Scale 1:250000 topographic map of Antarctica. Scientific Committee on Antarctic Research (SCAR). Since 1993, regularly upgraded and updated

== See also ==
- List of Antarctic and subantarctic islands
