= Kalmar Island =

Antarctic island

- Location within Antarctica Location within Antarctic Peninsula

Geography
- Location: Antarctica
- Coordinates: 64°59′21″S 64°03′35″W
- Archipelago: Wilhelm Archipelago
- Area: 16.15 ha (39.9 acres)
- Length: 1.12 km (0.696 mi)
- Width: 245 m (804 ft)

Administration
- Administered under the Antarctic Treaty System

Demographics
- Population: uninhabited

Kalmar Island (Bulgarian: остров Калмар, romanized: ostrov Kalmar, IPA: [ˈɔstrof kɐɫ'mar]) is the mostly ice-covered island 1.12 km long in west-southwest to east-northeast direction and 245 m wide in the Dannebrog Islands group of Wilhelm Archipelago in the Antarctic Peninsula region. Its surface area is 16.15 ha.

The feature is so named because of its shape supposedly resembling a specimen of squid ('kalmar' in Bulgarian), and in association with other descriptive names of islands in the area.

== Location ==
Kalmar Island is located at 64°59′21″S 64°03′35″W, which is 1.24 km northwest of Kosatka Island, and 7.27 km south of Knight Island and 7.33 km west-southwest of Kril Island in the Wauwermans Islands group. British mapping in 2001.

== Maps ==
- British Admiralty Nautical Chart 446 Anvers Island to Renaud Island. Scale 1:150000. Admiralty, UK Hydrographic Office, 2001
- Brabant Island to Argentine Islands. Scale 1:250000 topographic map. British Antarctic Survey, 2008
- Antarctic Digital Database (ADD). Scale 1:250000 topographic map of Antarctica. Scientific Committee on Antarctic Research (SCAR). Since 1993, regularly upgraded and updated

== See also ==
- List of Antarctic and subantarctic islands
