= Sprey Island =

Island in Wilhelm Archipelago, Antarctica

- Location within Antarctica Location within Antarctic Peninsula

Geography
- Location: Antarctica
- Coordinates: 65°03′24″S 64°09′55″W
- Archipelago: Wilhelm Archipelago
- Area: 27.94 ha (69.0 acres)
- Length: 1.23 km (0.764 mi)
- Width: 460 m (1510 ft)

Administration
- Administered under the Antarctic Treaty System

Demographics
- Population: uninhabited

Sprey Island (Bulgarian: остров Спрей, romanized: ostrov Sprey, IPA: [ˈɔstrof ˈsprɛj]) is the mostly ice-covered island 1.23 km long in southwest–northeast direction and 460 m wide in the Dannebrog Islands group of Wilhelm Archipelago in the Antarctic Peninsula region. Its surface area is 27.94 ha.

The feature is so named because of its shape supposedly resembling a spray bottle ('sprey' in Bulgarian), and in association with other descriptive names of islands in the area.

== Location ==
Sprey Island is located at 65°03′24″S 64°09′55″W, which is 124 m south of Shut Island, 2.4 km west-northwest of Taralezh Island, 640 m north-northwest of Bodloperka Island and 1.64 km east of Skoba Island. British mapping in 2001.

== Maps ==
- British Admiralty Nautical Chart 446 Anvers Island to Renaud Island. Scale 1:150000. Admiralty, UK Hydrographic Office, 2001
- Brabant Island to Argentine Islands. Scale 1:250000 topographic map. British Antarctic Survey, 2008
- Antarctic Digital Database (ADD). Scale 1:250000 topographic map of Antarctica. Scientific Committee on Antarctic Research (SCAR). Since 1993, regularly upgraded and updated

== See also ==
- List of Antarctic and subantarctic islands
