= Vedel Islands =

Island group in Wilhelm Archipelago, Antarctica

- Location within Antarctica

Geography
- Location: Antarctica
- Coordinates: 65°7′S 64°15′W
- Archipelago: Wilhelm Archipelago

The Vedel Islands (65°7′S 64°15′W) are a group of small islands lying 2 nautical miles (3.7 km; 2.3 mi) west of Hovgaard Island in the Wilhelm Archipelago, Antarctica.

== Location ==
Graham Coast, Antarctic Peninsula. Vedel Islands near the east end

The Vedel Islands are off the Graham Coast of the Antarctic Peninsula. They are in the Wilhelm Archipelago, southwest of Hovgaard Island and Booth Island, and northeast of the French Passage. They are northwest of Mount Shackleton on the mainland.

== Sailing directions ==
The US Defense Mapping Agency's Sailing Directions for Antarctica (1976) describes the Vedel Islands as follows:

Vedel Islets (Wedel Islands) lie westward of Hovgaard Island. distant about 2 miles. This group consists of numerous islets, the largest of which, Vedel Islet (Vadel Islet), Is about 1 mile long and half as wide with an elevation of about 252 feet. The next largest Le Myre de Vilers, is located close northward and has a small cove on the north shore which is open to northeastward. A chain of rocks extend northeastward of this group for a distance of 2 miles, and another group of rocks lies from 1 to 2 miles southward. The Vedel Islets have not been fully examined because this group is usually ice-locked.

A BEACON, 20 feet high, has been established on an island of the Stray Islands, a small group of islets which lies south of the Vedel Islets and west of Petermann Island. It consists of a post painted red with a cylindrical topmark painted in black and yellow bands.

Many dangers are charted westward, north-westward, and northward of the Vedel Islets to a distance of 5 miles; the navigator's attention is called to the note "Position Approximate," which applies to most of these dangers on the chart.

== Discovery and name ==
The largest island of this group was discovered in 1898 and given the name Vedel Island by the Belgian Antarctic Expedition (BelgAE) under Adrien de Gerlache. The French Antarctic Expedition (FrAE) under Charcot charted the remaining islands in 1904, and again in 1909, when the name was extended to include the entire group.

== Islands ==
Islands in the group, and nearby islands, include

=== Bager Island ===
65°07′28.0″S 64°15′53.0″W. A rocky island 963 metres (3,159 ft) long in W-E direction and 373 metres (1,224 ft) wide in the Vedel Islands group. Surface area 21 hectares (52 acres). Situated 245 metres (804 ft) southwest of Rak Island, 5.77 kilometres (3.59 mi) west by north of Hovgaard Island, 436 metres (1,430 ft) north of Klamer Island, and 3.78 kilometres (2.35 mi) east-southeast of Flank Island in the Myriad Islands group. So named because of its shape supposedly resembling an excavator ('bager' in Bulgarian), and in association with other descriptive names of islands in the area.

=== Friedburginsel ===
65°08′00.0″S 64°13′00.0″W. An island west of Booth Island. Discovered during German Antarctic Expedition 1873/74 under Captain Eduard Dallmann (1830-1896). Named after a Hamburg patron of the expedition.

=== Kamera Island ===
65°07′58.0″S 64°15′26.0″W. A mostly ice-covered island 778 metres (2,552 ft) long in SW-NE direction and 278 metres (912 ft) wide. Surface area 10.75 hectares (26.6 acres). Situated 5.6 kilometres (3.5 mi) northwest of Petermann Island, 80 metres (260 ft) northwest of Kormoran Island, 40 metres (130 ft) southeast of Klamer Island and 378 metres (1,240 ft) west of Pate Island. So named because of its shape supposedly resembling a TV camera ('kamera' in Bulgarian), and in association with other descriptive names of islands in the area.

=== Klamer Island ===
65°07′55.0″S 64°15′50.0″W. A rocky island 520 metres (1,710 ft) long in SW-NE direction and 150 metres (490 ft) wide in the Vedel Islands. Surface area 5.61 hectares (13.9 acres). Situated 6.12 kilometres (3.80 mi) northwest of Petermann Island, 40 metres (130 ft) northwest of Kamera Island and 436 metres (1,430 ft) south of Bager Island. So named because of its shape supposedly resembling a paper clip ('klamer' in Bulgarian), and in association with other descriptive names of islands in the area.

=== Kormoran Island ===
65°08′17.0″S 64°14′50.0″W. A mostly ice-free rocky island extending 848 metres (2,782 ft) in a south–north direction and 705 metres (2,313 ft) in a west–east direction in the Vedel Islands. Surface area 36.7 hectares (91 acres). Situated 4.72 kilometres (2.93 mi) northwest of Petermann Island, 80 metres (260 ft) southeast of Kamera Island and 160 metres (520 ft) southwest of Pate Island. So named because of its shape supposedly resembling a cormorant ('kormoran' in Bulgarian), and in association with other descriptive names of islands in the area.

=== Kostenurka Island ===
65°07′22.0″S 64°13′05.0″W. A mostly ice-covered island 1.12 kilometres (0.70 mi) long in southwest–northeast direction and 537 metres (1,762 ft) wide in the Vedel Islands. Surface area 40.4 hectares (100 acres). Situated 3.77 kilometres (2.34 mi) northwest of Hovgaard Island, 50 metres (160 ft) northwest of Friedburginsel, 652 metres (2,139 ft) east-southeast of Rak Island and 37 metres (121 ft) south of Lapa Island. So named because of its shape supposedly resembling a turtle ('kostenurka' in Bulgarian), and in association with other descriptive names of islands in the area.

=== Lapa Island ===
65°07′02.0″S 64°13′02.0″W. A mostly ice-covered island 800 metres (2,600 ft) long in W-E direction and 490 metres (1,610 ft) wide in the Vedel Islands. Surface area 21.73 hectares (53.7 acres). Situated 3.9 kilometres (2.4 mi) northwest of Hovgaard Island, 37 metres (121 ft) north of Kostenurka Island, 805 metres (2,641 ft) east-northeast of Rak Island, and 4.97 kilometres (3.09 mi) southwest of Lamya Island in the Dannebrog Islands group. So named because of its shape supposedly resembling an animal paw ('lapa' in Bulgarian), and in association with other descriptive names of islands in the area.

=== Pate Island ===
65°07′56.0″S 64°14′05.0″W. A mostly ice-free rocky island 667 metres (2,188 ft) long in west–east direction and 390 metres (1,280 ft) wide in the Vedel Islands. Surface area 12.67 hectares (31.3 acres). Situated 4.9 kilometres (3.0 mi) northwest of Petermann Island, 160 metres (520 ft) northeast of Kormoran Island, 1 kilometre (0.62 mi) southeast of Bager Island and 105 metres (344 ft) southwest of Friedburginsel. So named because of its shape supposedly resembling a baby duck ('pate' in Bulgarian), and in association with other descriptive names of islands in the area.

=== Rak Island ===
65°07′17.0″S 64°14′52.0″W. A rocky island 615 metres (2,018 ft) long in west–east direction and 200 metres (660 ft) wide in the Vedel Islands. Surface area 6.87 hectares (17.0 acres). Situated 5.25 kilometres (3.26 mi) west-northwest of Hovgaard Island, 652 metres (2,139 ft) west-northwest of Kostenurka Island, 245 metres (804 ft) northeast of Bager Island and 805 metres (2,641 ft) west-southwest of Lapa Island. So named because of its shape supposedly resembling a crab ('rak' in Bulgarian), and in association with other descriptive names of islands in the area.

=== Stray Islands ===
65°10′S 64°14′W. A scattered but distinct group of islands lying 2 nautical miles (3.7 km; 2.3 mi) west of Petermann Island. Mapped by the FIDS from photos taken by Hunting Aerosurveys Ltd. in 1956-57 and from the helicopter of HMS Protector in March 1958. So named by the UK-APC because the group is scattered.

== Sources ==
- Alberts, Fred G., ed. (1995), Geographic Names of the Antarctic (PDF) (2 ed.), United States Board on Geographic Names This article incorporates public domain material from websites or documents of the United States Board on Geographic Names.
- "Bager Island", Composite Gazetteer of Antarctica, Scientific Committee on Antarctic Research
- "Friedburginsel", Composite Gazetteer of Antarctica, Scientific Committee on Antarctic Research
- Graham Land and South Shetland Islands, BAS: British Antarctic Survey, 2005
- "Kamera Island", Composite Gazetteer of Antarctica, Scientific Committee on Antarctic Research
- "Klamer Island", Composite Gazetteer of Antarctica, Scientific Committee on Antarctic Research
- "Kormoran Island", Composite Gazetteer of Antarctica, Scientific Committee on Antarctic Research
- "Kostenurka Island", Composite Gazetteer of Antarctica, Scientific Committee on Antarctic Research
- "Lapa Island", Composite Gazetteer of Antarctica, Scientific Committee on Antarctic Research
- "Pate Island", Composite Gazetteer of Antarctica, Scientific Committee on Antarctic Research
- "Rak Island", Composite Gazetteer of Antarctica, Scientific Committee on Antarctic Research
- Sailing Directions for Antarctica: Includes Islands South of Latitude 60.̊, United States. Defense Mapping Agency. Hydrographic Center, 1976 This article incorporates public domain material from websites or documents of the National Geospatial-Intelligence Agency.
