= Taralezh Island =

Antarctic island

- Location within Antarctica Location within Antarctic Peninsula

Geography
- Location: Antarctica
- Coordinates: 65°03′44″S 64°06′27″W
- Archipelago: Wilhelm Archipelago
- Area: 6.71 ha (16.6 acres)
- Length: 470 m (1540 ft)
- Width: 232 m (761 ft)

Administration
- Administered under the Antarctic Treaty System

Demographics
- Population: uninhabited

Taralezh Island (Bulgarian: остров Таралеж, romanized: ostrov Taralezh, IPA: [ˈɔstrof tɐrɐˈɫɛʒ]) is the partly ice-free island 470 m long in west–east direction and 232 km wide in the Dannebrog Islands group of Wilhelm Archipelago in the Antarctic Peninsula region. Its surface area is 6.71 ha.

The feature is so named because of its shape supposedly resembling a hedgehog ('taralezh' in Bulgarian), and in association with other descriptive names of islands in the area.

== Location ==
Taralezh Island is located at 65°03′44″S 64°06′27″W, which is 45 m north of Spatnik Island, 2.4 km east-southeast of Sprey Island, 1.67 km southwest of Revolver Island and 2.54 km west-northwest of the west extremity of Booth Island. British mapping in 2001.

== Maps ==
- British Admiralty Nautical Chart 446 Anvers Island to Renaud Island. Scale 1:150000. Admiralty, UK Hydrographic Office, 2001
- Brabant Island to Argentine Islands. Scale 1:250000 topographic map. British Antarctic Survey, 2008
- Antarctic Digital Database (ADD). Scale 1:250000 topographic map of Antarctica. Scientific Committee on Antarctic Research (SCAR). Since 1993, regularly upgraded and updated

== See also ==
- List of Antarctic and subantarctic islands
