= Friar Island =

Island in Wilhelm Archipelago, Antarctica

Friar Island (64°55′S 63°55′W) is an island lying immediately northeast of Manciple Island in the Wauwermans Islands, in the Wilhelm Archipelago. It was shown on an Argentine government chart of 1952, but not named. It was named by the UK Antarctic Place-Names Committee in 1958 after The Friar, one of the characters in Geoffrey Chaucer's The Canterbury Tales.

== See also ==
- List of Antarctic and sub-Antarctic islands
