= Yalour Islands =

Island group in Wilhelm Archipelago, Antarctica

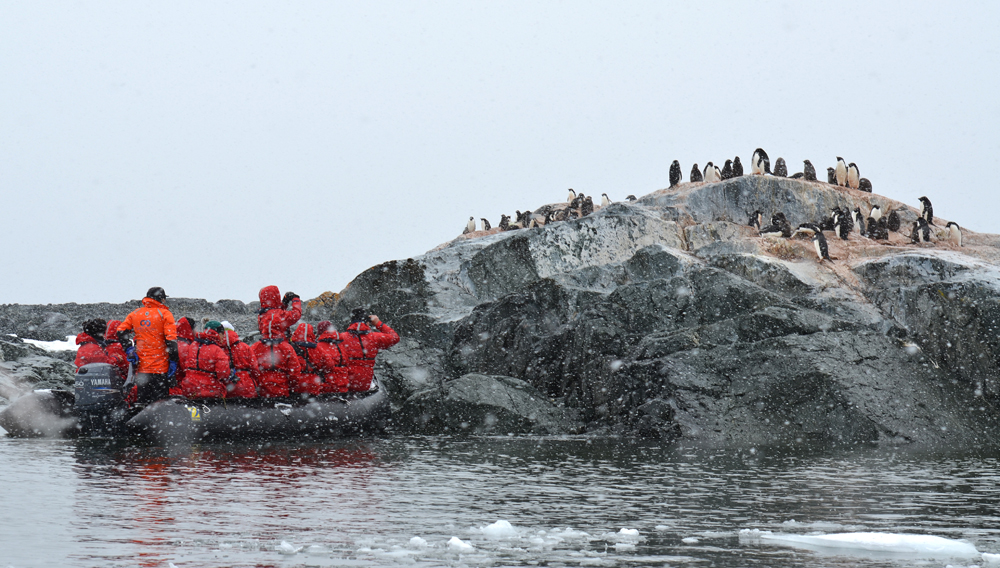
- Tourist expedition Zodiac visits Adelie penguins in the Yalour Islands

- Location within Antarctica

Geography
- Location: Antarctica
- Coordinates: 65°14′S 64°10′W
- Archipelago: Wilhelm Archipelago

Administration
- Administered under the Antarctic Treaty System

Demographics
- Population: Uninhabited

Yalour Islands, also known as the Jalour Islands, is a group of islands and rocks 2.8 kilometres (1.5 nmi) in extent in the south part of the Wilhelm Archipelago. The group lies 1.9 kilometres (1 nmi) northwest of Cape Tuxen, Graham Land. Discovered and named by the French Antarctic Expedition, 1903–05, under J.B. Charcot. Named for Lieutenant Jorge Yalour, Argentine Navy, an officer of the Argentine corvette Uruguay which came to the rescue of the shipwrecked Swedish Antarctic Expedition in November 1903.

The rocks observed on the Yalours and surrounding areas are predominantly igneous intrusives that have cooled deep under ground. The main rock type is grey to black gabbro composed of small crystals of grey-white feldspar and black pyroxene. The rocks here were formed by much the same process that the rest of the peninsula was formed; the Pacific plate sliding under the Antarctic Peninsula in an ocean/continent subduction-type tectonic event. This process, called orogenesis, is one of the most common ways for a mountain chain to form. The Andres and the coast ranges of North America are other classic examples of this type of tectonism. The mountain building has nearly stopped though; it is only at the very tip of the peninsula and in the South Shetland Islands that the process continues. For the rest of the peninsula, it erosion and gravity's turn to shape the landscape.

About 8,000 pairs of Adelie penguins nest in the Yalour Islands.

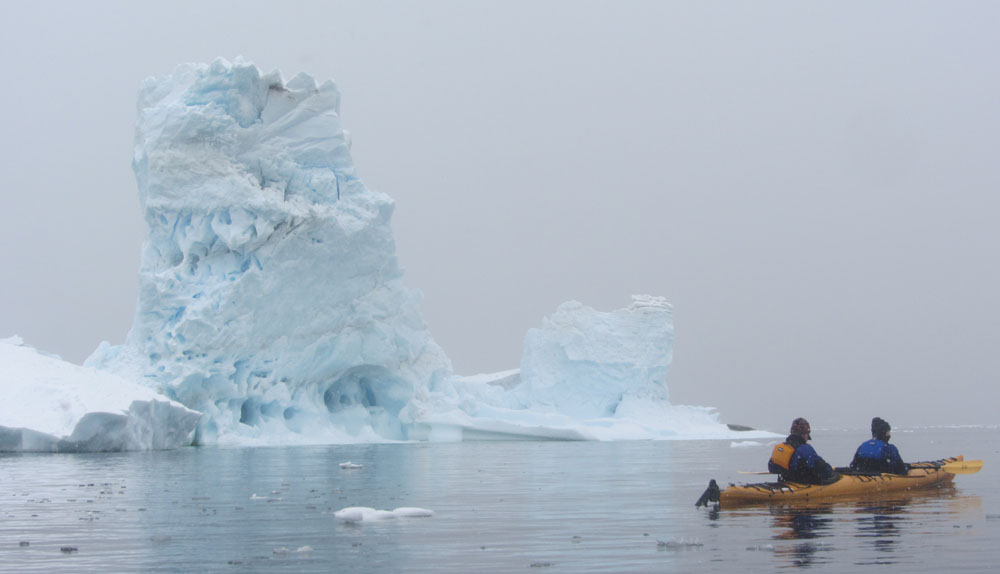
Kayaking near the Yalour Islands

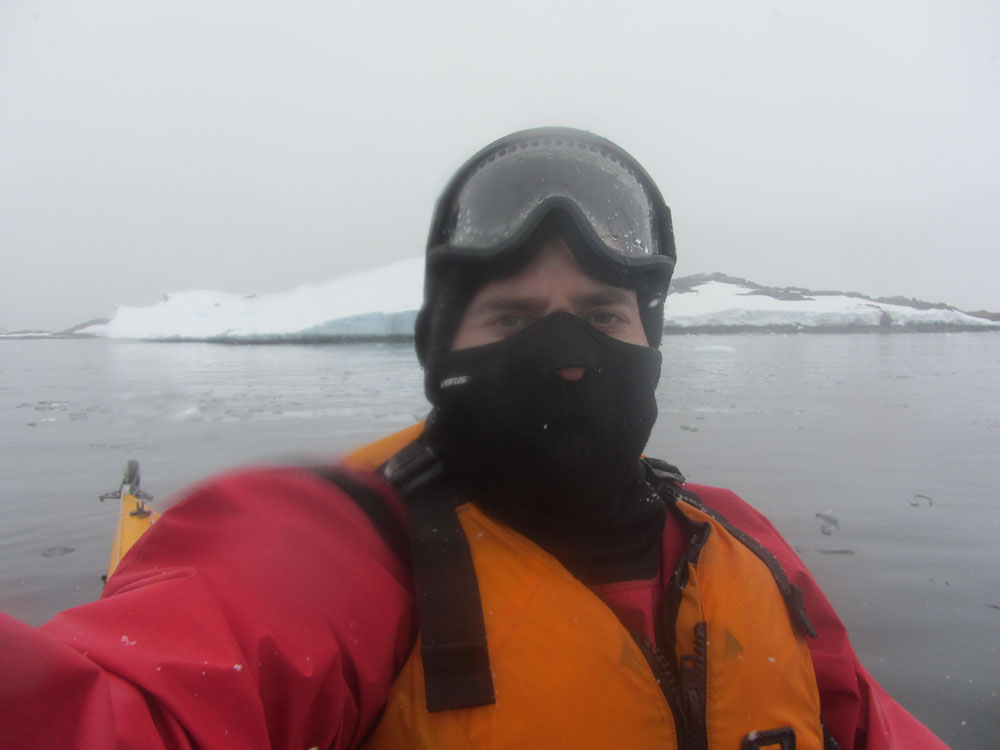
Kayaker near the Yalour Islands

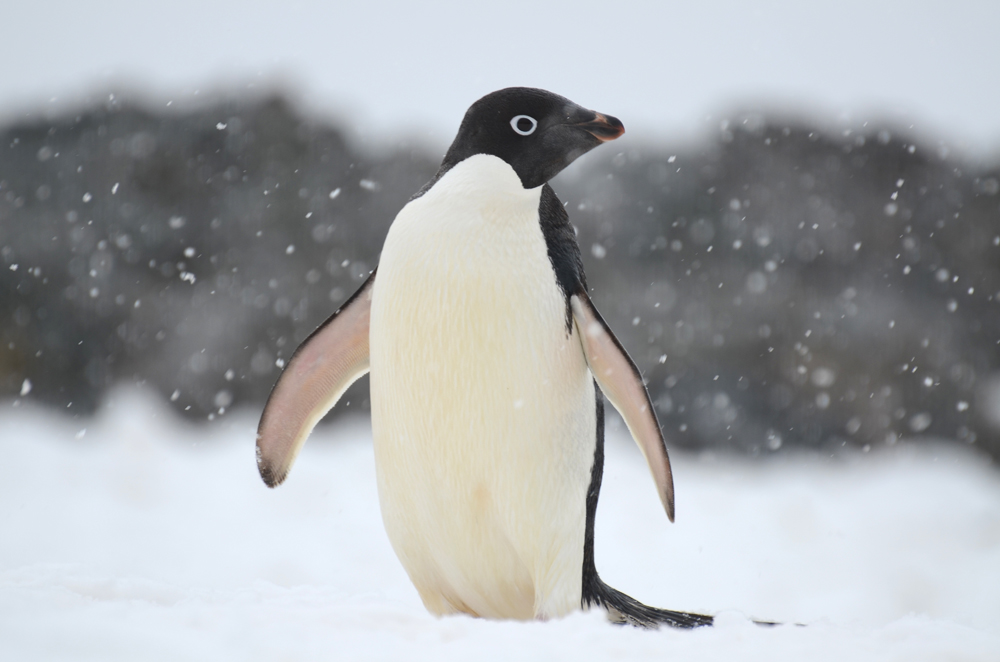
Adelie penguin in the Yalour Islands

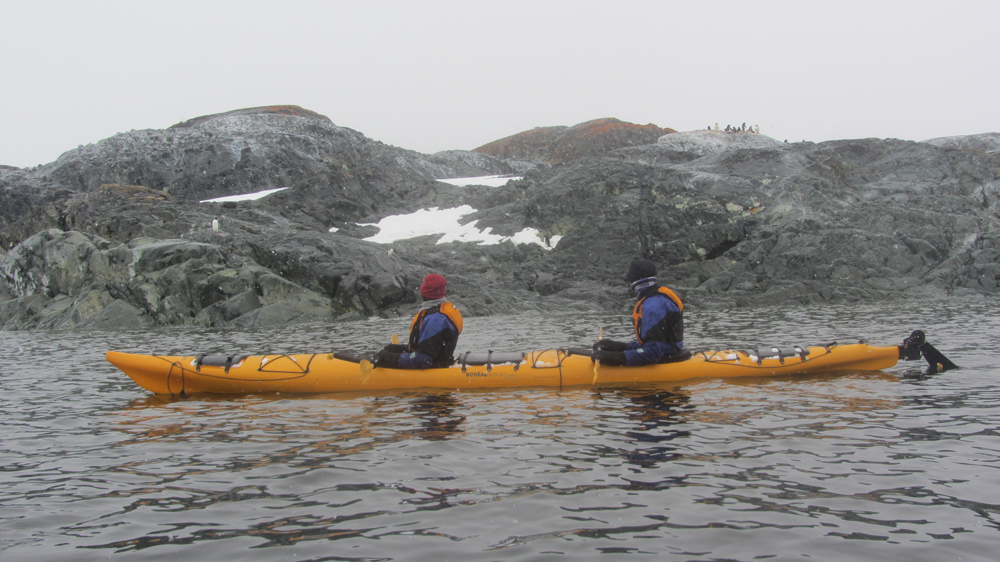
Kayaking near the Yalour Islands

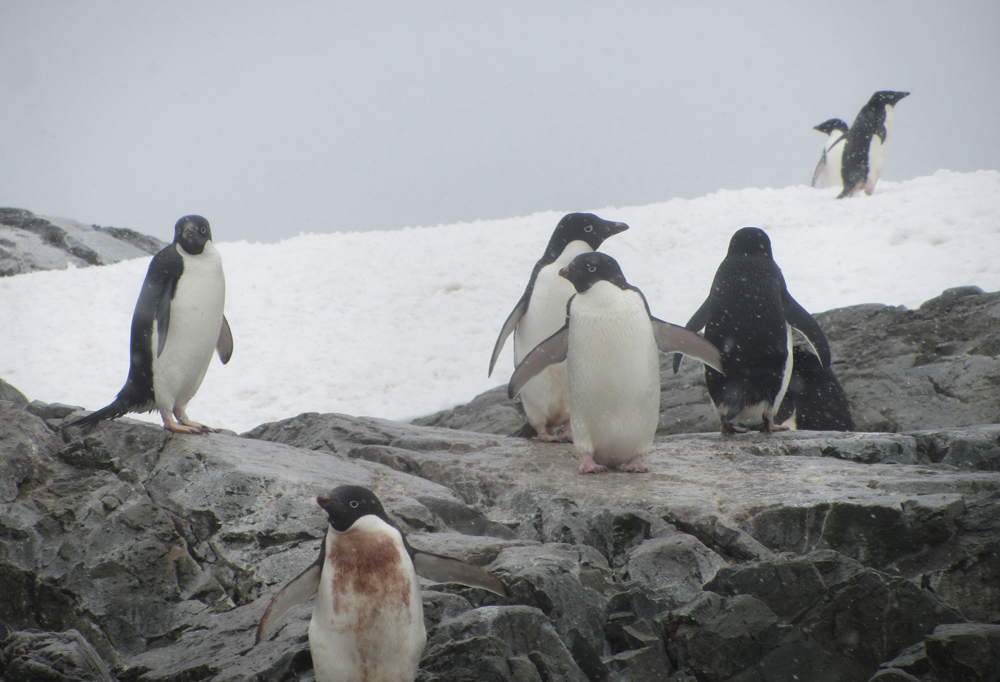
Adelie penguins in the Yalour Islands

== See also ==
- List of Antarctic and sub-Antarctic islands
