= Knight Island (Antarctica) =

Island in Wilhelm Archipelago, Antarctica

Knight Island (64°55′S 64°1′W) is an island 1.5 nautical miles (3 km) long, lying 1 nautical mile (2 km) west of Reeve Island in the Wauwermans Islands, in the Wilhelm Archipelago, Antarctica. The island was shown on an Argentinian government chart of 1950. It was named by the UK Antarctic Place-Names Committee in 1958 after The Knight, one of the characters in Chaucer's The Canterbury Tales.

== See also ==
- List of Antarctic and sub-Antarctic islands
