= Gaunt Rocks =

- Interactive map of Gaunt Rocks

Geography
- Location: Antarctica
- Coordinates: 65°17′03″S 64°18′54″W
- Archipelago: Wilhelm Archipelago

The Gaunt Rocks (65°17′03″S 64°18′54″W) are a small group of rocks lying 2 nautical miles (4 km) west of the Barros Rocks, in the Wilhelm Archipelago. They were roughly charted by the British Graham Land Expedition under John Rymill, 1934–37, and more accurately positioned by the Falkland Islands Dependencies Survey from photos taken by Hunting Aerosurveys Ltd in 1956–57. The name, given by the UK Antarctic Place-Names Committee in 1959, is descriptive of these desolate, grim-looking rocks.
