= Elisabethinsel =

Antarctic island

- Location within Antarctica Location within Antarctic Peninsula

Geography
- Location: Antarctica
- Coordinates: 65°04′39″S 64°06′54″W
- Area: 95.12 ha (235.0 acres)
- Length: 1.6 km (0.99 mi)
- Width: 880 m (2890 ft)

Administration
- Administered under the Antarctic Treaty System

Demographics
- Population: Uninhabited

Elisabethinsel (Elisabeth Island) is the mostly ice-covered island 1.6 km long in southwest–northeast direction and 880 m wide in the Dannebrog Islands group of Wilhelm Archipelago in the Antarctic Peninsula region. Its surface area is 95.12 ha.

The feature was named by German scientists as the result of an Antarctic trip in the southern summer of 1893/94.

== Location ==
Elisabethinsel is located 3.01 km west of the westernmost extremity of Booth Island and 3 km northwest of Pléneau Island. Separated from the adjacent Stego Island on the northwest by a passage narrowing to 52 m at points. British mapping in 2001.

== Maps ==
- British Admiralty Nautical Chart 446 Anvers Island to Renaud Island. Scale 1:150000. Admiralty, UK Hydrographic Office, 2001
- Brabant Island to Argentine Islands. Scale 1:250000 topographic map. British Antarctic Survey, 2008
- Antarctic Digital Database (ADD). Scale 1:250000 topographic map of Antarctica. Scientific Committee on Antarctic Research (SCAR). Since 1993, regularly upgraded and updated

== See also ==
- List of Antarctic and subantarctic islands
