= Kril Island =

Antarctic island

- Location within Antarctica Location within Antarctic Peninsula

Geography
- Location: Antarctica
- Coordinates: 64°58′23″S 63°52′58″W
- Archipelago: Wilhelm Archipelago
- Area: 24.92 ha (61.6 acres)
- Length: 1.2 km (0.75 mi)
- Width: 310 m (1020 ft)

Administration
- Administered under the Antarctic Treaty System

Demographics
- Population: uninhabited

Kril Island (Bulgarian: остров Крил, romanized: ostrov Kril, IPA: [ˈɔstrof ˈkriɫ]) is the mostly ice-covered island 1.2 km long in southwest–northeast direction and 310 m wide in the Wauwermans Islands group of Wilhelm Archipelago in the Antarctic Peninsula region. Its surface area is 24.92 ha.

The feature is so named because of its shape supposedly resembling a specimen of krill ('kril' in Bulgarian), and in association with other descriptive names of islands in the area.

== Location ==
Kril Island is located 4.15 km south-southeast of Host Island, 275 m northwest of Lobel Island, 6.62 km north-northwest of False Cape Renard on Graham Land, and 5.55 km northeast of Mishka Island in the Dannebrog Islands group. British mapping in 2001.

== Maps ==
- British Admiralty Nautical Chart 446 Anvers Island to Renaud Island. Scale 1:150000. Admiralty, UK Hydrographic Office, 2001
- Brabant Island to Argentine Islands. Scale 1:250000 topographic map. British Antarctic Survey, 2008
- Antarctic Digital Database (ADD). Scale 1:250000 topographic map of Antarctica. Scientific Committee on Antarctic Research (SCAR). Since 1993, regularly upgraded and updated

== See also ==
- List of Antarctic and subantarctic islands
