= Wednesday Island =

Island in Antarctica

- Location within Antarctica

Geography
- Location: Antarctica
- Coordinates: 64°56′S 63°45′W
- Length: 1.9 km (1.18 mi)

Administration
- None (Part of the Antarctic Treaty System)
- Administered under the Antarctic Treaty System

Demographics
- Population: Uninhabited
- Ethnic groups: N/A

Wednesday Island is an island 1 nautical mile (1.9 km; 1.2 mi) long, at the east end of Wauwermans Islands in the north part of Wilhelm Archipelago, Antarctica. The Wauwermans Islands were discovered by the German expedition under Eduard Dallmann, 1873–74, and were later roughly mapped by the Belgian Antarctic Expedition under Gerlache, 1897–99, and the French Antarctic Expedition under Charcot, 1903–05. Wednesday Island was charted by the British Graham Land Expedition (BGLE), 1934–37, under John Rymill, and so named because it was first sighted on one Wednesday.

== See also ==
- Composite Antarctic Gazetteer
- List of Antarctic and sub-Antarctic islands
- List of Antarctic islands south of 60° S
- SCAR
- Territorial claims in Antarctica
