= Ambrose Rocks =

Cluster of rocks off Graham Land, Antarctica

The Ambrose Rocks (65°16′S 64°22′W) are a small cluster of rocks situated southwest of the southern Argentine Islands and 1 nautical mile (2 km) northwest of the Gaunt Rocks, off the west coast of Graham Land, Antarctica. They were named by the UK Antarctic Place-Names Committee for David A. Ambrose, a survey assistant of the Hydrographic Survey Unit from HMS Endurance working in this area in February 1969.

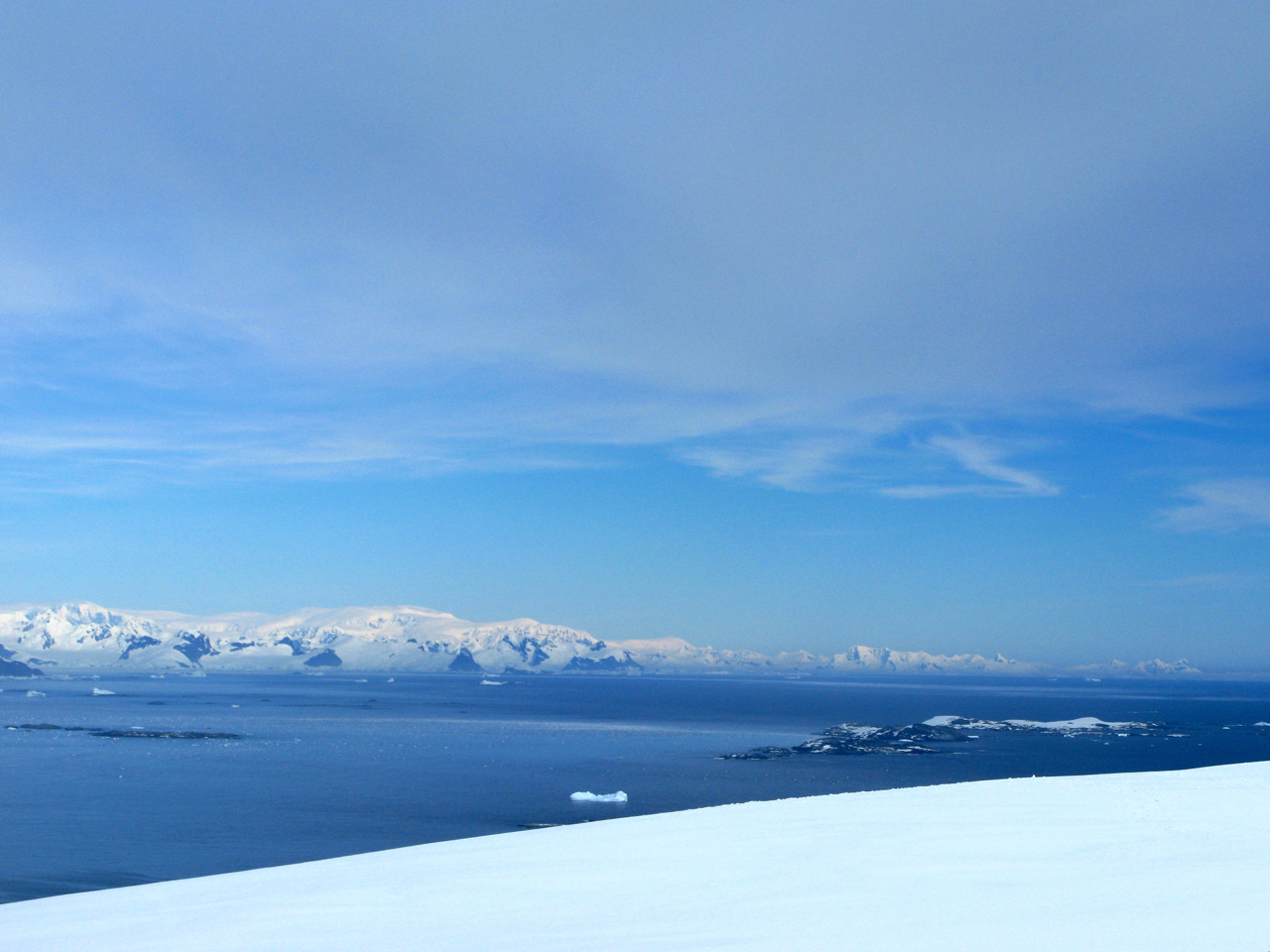
Yalour and Argentina Islands
