= Snag Rocks =

Geographic feature in the Wilhelm Archipelago

Snag Rocks, (65°8′S 64°27′W) also known as Rocas Bravo, is a cluster of rocks off the west coast of the Antarctic Peninsula. This cluster of rocks lies mid-channel in the French Passage between the Roca Islands and the Myriad Islands, in the Wilhelm Archipelago. Photographed from the helicopter of HMS Protector in March 1958, Snag Rocks was so named by United Kingdom Antarctic Place-Names Committee (UK-APC) because the feature presents a hazard or obstacle to navigation.
