= Lumus Rock =

Rock in Antarctica

- Location within Antarctica
- Etymology: Ship's cat Lummo

Geography
- Location: Antarctica
- Coordinates: 65°13′S 65°18′W
- Archipelago: Wilhelm Archipelago
- Adjacent to: Southern Ocean

Administration
- Administered under the Antarctic Treaty System

Demographics
- Population: Uninhabited

Lumus Rock is a rock located 4 nautical miles (7 km) west-northwest of Sooty Rock, marking the southwestern extremity of the Wilhelm Archipelago off the Graham Coast of the Antarctic Peninsula, Antarctica. It was discovered by British Graham Land Expedition (BGLE), 1934–37, and named "Lumus Reef" after one of the expedition cats, the only one to survive the Antarctic winter. The BGLE naming has been accepted because of long use, though a change in generic term, from reef to rock, was made on recommendation by the UK Antarctic Place-Names Committee in 1971. The rock is situated roughly midway between Anvers and Renaud Island at 7.8 miles (12.6 km) west-northwest of the Betbeder Islands, in the Hugo Island Trough, belonging to the Palmer Deep, an inner shelf structural depression.

== Etymology ==
Lumus Rock was named after the ship's cat, Lummo, present on the Penola, a three-masted schooner of the British Graham Land Expedition, visiting the Wilhelm Archipelago from 1934 to 1937. Lummo survived the three-year expedition and died in Woking, Surrey, England during the Second World War.

== Geology ==
The Antarctic Peninsula, located on the Antarctic Plate, and its offshore islands are probably composed of Late Paleozoic rocks that are strongly folded. The geological map of Antarctica lists Mesozoic volcanic rocks and granitoids in the area.
