= Reeve Island =

Island in Wilhelm Archipelago, Antarctica

Coordinates: 64°55′S 63°58′W

Reeve Island is an island 1.5 nautical miles long, lying between Knight and Friar islands in the Wauwermans Islands, in the Wilhelm Archipelago. Shown on an Argentine government chart of 1950. Named by the United Kingdom Antarctic Place-Names Committee (UK-APC) in 1958 after one of the characters in Chaucer's Canterbury Tales.

== See also ==
- List of Antarctic and sub-Antarctic islands
