= Stego Island =

Antarctic island

- Location within Antarctica Location within Antarctic Peninsula

Geography
- Location: Antarctica
- Coordinates: 65°04′21″S 64°07′57″W
- Archipelago: Wilhelm Archipelago
- Area: 93.32 ha (230.6 acres)
- Length: 2.07 km (1.286 mi)
- Width: 820 m (2690 ft)

Administration
- Administered under the Antarctic Treaty System

Demographics
- Population: uninhabited

Stego Island (Bulgarian: остров Стего, romanized: ostrov Stego, IPA: [ˈɔstrof ˈstɛgo]) is the mostly ice-covered island 2.07 km long in southwest–northeast direction and 820 m wide in the Dannebrog Islands group of Wilhelm Archipelago in the Antarctic Peninsula region. Its surface area is 93.32 ha.

The feature is so named because of its shape supposedly resembling a stegosaur, and in association with other descriptive names of islands in the area.

== Location ==
Stego Island is located at 65°04′21″S 64°07′57″W, which is 52 m northwest of Elisabethinsel, 293 m southeast of Tsankov Island, 240 m southwest of Spatnik Island and 3.01 km west of the west extremity of Booth Island. British mapping in 2001.

== Maps ==
- British Admiralty Nautical Chart 446 Anvers Island to Renaud Island. Scale 1:150000. Admiralty, UK Hydrographic Office, 2001
- Brabant Island to Argentine Islands. Scale 1:250000 topographic map. British Antarctic Survey, 2008
- Antarctic Digital Database (ADD). Scale 1:250000 topographic map of Antarctica. Scientific Committee on Antarctic Research (SCAR). Since 1993, regularly upgraded and updated

== See also ==
- List of Antarctic and subantarctic islands
