= Myriad Islands =

Island group in Wilhelm Archipelago, Antarctica

Myriad Islands (65°5′S 64°25′W) is a scattered group of small islands and rocks extending for about 5 nautical miles (9 km), lying west of the Dannebrog and Vedel Islands in the Wilhelm Archipelago. Charted by the British Graham Land Expedition (BGLE) under Rymill, 1934–37. So named by the United Kingdom Antarctic Place-Names Committee (UK-APC) in 1959 because of the very many islands in the group.

== Islands in the group ==
- Final Island
- Flank Island
- Kostilka Island

== See also ==
- List of Antarctic and sub-Antarctic islands
