= Flank Island =

Island in Wilhelm Archipelago, Antarctica

Flank Island (65°7′S 64°21′W) is the southernmost of the Myriad Islands, lying 2 nautical miles (4 km) east-northeast of the Snag Rocks in the Wilhelm Archipelago. It was mapped by the Falkland Islands Dependencies Survey from photos taken by Hunting Aerosurveys Ltd in 1956–57 and from the helicopter of HMS Protector in March 1958, and was named by the UK Antarctic Place-Names Committee because of its position.

== See also ==
- List of Antarctic and sub-Antarctic islands
