= Bismarck Strait =

Antarctic sea strait

Coordinates: 64°51′S 64°00′W

The Bismarck Strait is a channel in Antarctica. It is located between the southern end of Anvers and Wiencke Islands and the Wilhelm Archipelago. It was surveyed in 1874 by First Antarctic German expedition under Captain Eduard Dallmann.

This channel was named by Dallmann after Otto von Bismarck.
