= Brown Island (Antarctica) =

Island in Wilhelm Archipelago, Antarctica

- Location within Antarctica

Geography
- Location: Antarctica
- Coordinates: 64°58′S 63°47′W
- Archipelago: Wilhelm Archipelago

Administration
- Administered under the Antarctic Treaty System

Demographics
- Population: Uninhabited

Brown Island is a small, brown, almost snow-free island in the southeastern part of the Wauwermans Islands, 4 km (2 nmi) southwest of Wednesday Island, in the Wilhelm Archipelago. It was charted by the British Graham Land Expedition under John Rymill, 1934–37, and so named because its brown color distinguished it from adjacent snow-capped islands.

== See also ==
- List of Antarctic and sub-Antarctic islands
