= Host Island =

Island in the Wilhelm Archipelago, Antarctica

Coordinates: 64°56′S 63°55′W

Host Island is an island lying immediately southeast of Manciple Island in the Wauwermans Islands, in the Wilhelm Archipelago, Antarctica. It was shown on an Argentine government chart of 1950. The island was named by the UK Antarctic Place-Names Committee in 1958 after The Host, one of the characters in Chaucer's The Canterbury Tales.

== See also ==
- List of Antarctic and sub-Antarctic islands
