= Wauwermans Islands =

Island group in Wilhelm Archipelago, Antarctica

- Location within Antarctica

Geography
- Location: Antarctica
- Coordinates: 64°55′S 63°53′W
- Archipelago: Wilhelm Archipelago

Administration
- Administered under the Antarctic Treaty System

Demographics
- Population: Uninhabited

Wauwermans Islands is a group of small, low, snow-covered islands forming the northernmost group in the Wilhelm Archipelago. Discovered by a German expedition 1873–74, under Dallmann. Sighted by the Belgian Antarctic Expedition, 1897–99, under Gerlache, and named for Lieutenant General Wauwermans, president of the Société Royale Belge de Géographie, a supporter of the expedition.

== Islands in group ==
- Brown Island
- Friar Island
- Guido Island
- Heed Rock
- Host Island
- Knight Island
- Kril Island
- Lobel Island
- Manciple Island
- Mida Island
- Prevot Island
- Prioress Island
- Reeve Island
- Sinclair Island
- Squire Island
- Vetrilo Rocks
- Wednesday Island
- Yato Rocks
- Zherav Island

== See also ==
- Gerlache Strait Geology
- Anvers Island Geology
- List of Antarctic and sub-Antarctic islands
