= Dannebrog Islands =

Island group in Wilhelm Archipelago, Antarctica

- Location within Antarctic Peninsula

Geography
- Location: Antarctic Peninsula
- Coordinates: 65°3′S 64°8′W
- Archipelago: Wilhelm Archipelago

Administration
- Antarctica

Demographics
- Population: 0

The Dannebrog Islands are a group of islands and rocks lying between the Wauwermans Islands and the Vedel Islands in the Wilhelm Archipelago.

The Wilhelm Archipelago was first sighted and named by a German expedition under Eduard Dallmann, 1873–74, and was resighted and the whole archipelago named the Dannebrog Islands by the Belgian Antarctic Expedition, 1897–99, under Gerlache, in appreciation of support given to Gerlache by Denmark. Dallmann's original naming has been retained for the archipelago, and the name Dannebrog restricted to the smaller group here described.

== Islands in the group ==
- Akula Island
- Bodloperka Island
- Elisabethinsel
- Greblo Island
- Hoatsin Island
- Kalmar Island
- Kosatka Island
- Lamantin Island
- Mechka Island
- Meduza Island
- Mishka Island
- Padpadak Island
- Pegas Island
- Peperuda Island
- Raketa Island
- Rog Island
- Shut Island
- Skoba Island
- Sprey Island
- Stego Island
- Taralezh Island
- Tigan Island
- Tyulen Island
- Yastreb Island

== See also ==
- List of Antarctic and sub-Antarctic islands
