= Booth Island =

Island in Antarctica

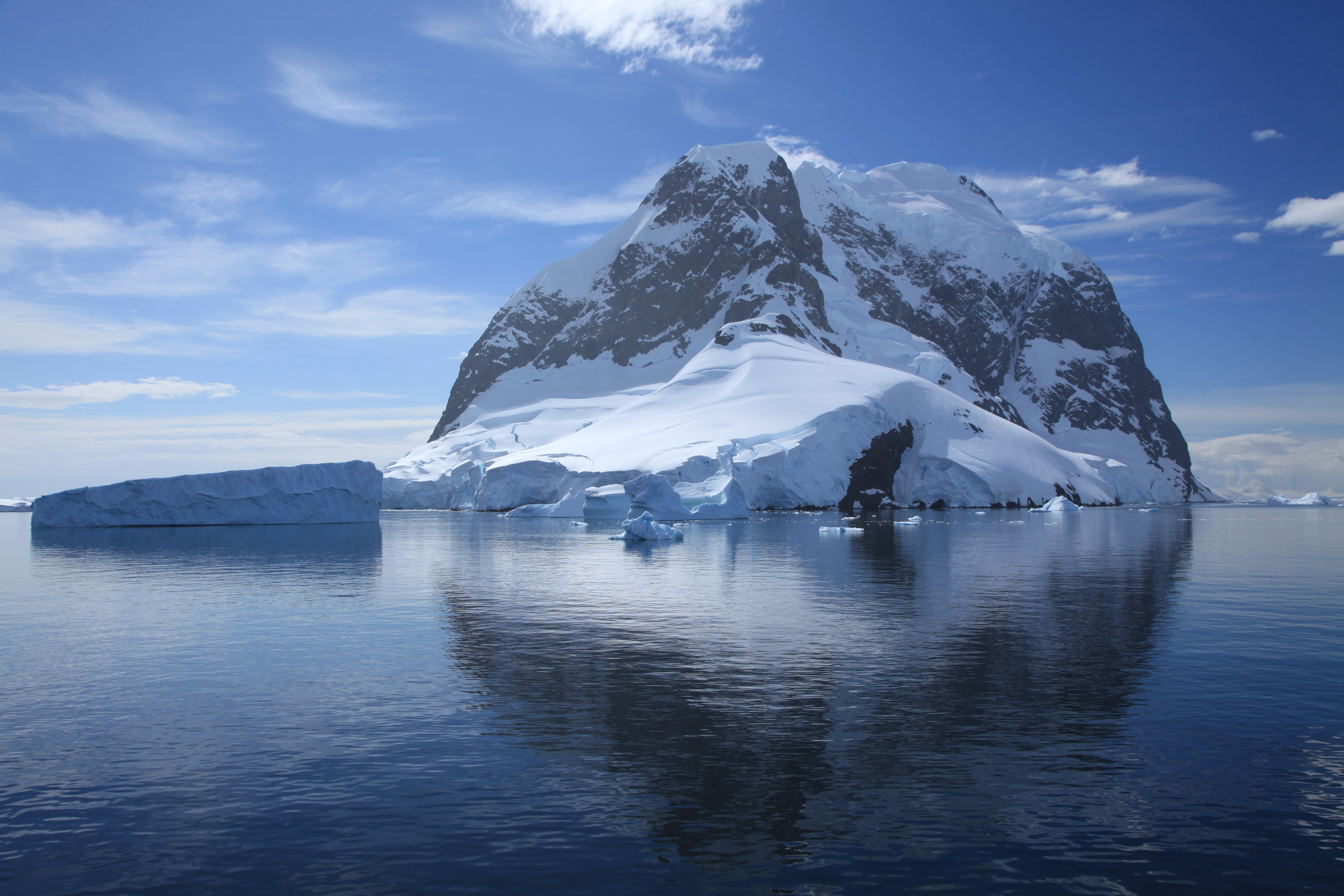
- Icebergs and Booth Island

- Location within Antarctica

Geography
- Location: Antarctica
- Coordinates: 65°4′48″S 64°0′0″W
- Archipelago: Wilhelm Archipelago
- Length: 8 km (5 mi)
- Highest elevation: 980 m (3220 ft)
- Highest point: Wandel Peak

Administration
- Administered under the Antarctic Treaty System

Booth Island (or Wandel Island; 65°4′48″S 64°0′0″W) is a Y-shaped island, 5 nautical miles (9.3 km; 5.8 mi) long and rising to 980 metres (3,220 ft) in the northeast part of the Wilhelm Archipelago, Antarctica.

== Location ==
Graham Coast, Antarctic Peninsula. Booth Island off the east end

Booth Island is off the east end of the Graham Coast on the west side of the Antarctic Peninsula. It is in the Wilhelm Archipelago, to the northeast of the Vedel Islands and southwest of the Wauwermans Islands. It is separated from the mainland by the Lemaire Channel, to the southeast. It is east of Cape Renard at the entrance to Flandres Bay.

Booth Island is partly covered by an ice cap of varying thickness. The ice is at most slightly more than 24 metres (80 ft) thick.

== Sailing directions ==
The US Defense Mapping Agency's Sailing Directions for Antarctica (1976) describes Booth Island as follows:

Booth Island (Wandel Island) is the largest of the [Dannebrog Islands], being about 5 miles long and 2 miles wide near the middle, and is situated about 4 miles southwestward of Cape Renard. It is high and rugged, and consists of two rocky masses joined by a low narrow peninsula of ice and snow. The northern of these masses rises to an elevation of 2,083 feet in Mount Lacroix (Mount Lecroix), a rounded summit presenting on all sides vertical walls colored red by iron pyrites. On the northern slope of Mount Lacroix is Clery Peak, a sharp bare rocky cone which forms Turquet Point, the northern extremity of the Island.

The southern part of the Island rises to 3,215 feet in Gourdon Peak (Gourdon Mount, Wandel Peak) from which two spurs extend northward and fall steeply to the sea enclosing a beautiful glacier between them. The western of these spurs contains three prominent peaks, Louise Peak (Mount Louise), 2,050 feet high, Mount Gueguen (Otseguen Peak), 1,221 feet high, and Jeanne Hill (Mount Jeanne), 633 feet high, respectively, and projects northwestward forming a peninsula about 1 mile in length.

On the northern slope of Jeanne Hill is a large penguin rookery, to the north of which is a small peninsula the extremity of which has been named Vanssay Point (Point de Vanssay). Cholet Isle extends northeastward from the extremity of the major peninsula, with a bay lying between it and Vanssay Point. This bay has been named Port Charcot. To westward of Cholet Isle Is Libois Bay, a small protected harbor open to northwestward between Rose Point, the northern entrance point, and Point Paumelle (Paumelle Point), the southern promontory. Under the western Cliffs of the peninsula is Roland Bay, the southern shore of which is the Icy spur of Herviou Point, the western extremity of Booth Island. A BEACON Is located on the shore in the vicinity of Roland Bay. Salpetriere Bay is a wide embayment on the western shore over which stands the steep slopes of Jeanne Hill and the adjoining peaks. A rock, awash, lies in the middle of this bay. From Poste Point, the southern point of Salpetriere Bay, the coast line is steep and trends southward and southeastward for 2 miles to Roullin Point, the southern extremity.

== Discovery and name ==
Booth Island was discovered and named by a German expedition under Eduard Dallmann in 1873-74, probably for Oskar Booth or Stanley Booth, or both, members of the Hamburg Geographical Society at that time. The United States Advisory Committee on Antarctic Names (US-ACAN) has rejected the name Wandel Island, applied by the Belgian Antarctic Expedition (BelgAE), 1897–99, in favor of the original naming.

The sea slug species Curnon granulosa was first described in 1906 from a single specimen found at 40 m depth at Booth Island.

== Northern features ==
Features of the northeast peninsula of the island, the Mount Lacroix peninsula, include:

=== Turquet Point ===
65°03′S 63°57′W. A point marking the north extremity of Booth Island. Probably first seen by the German expedition 1873-74, under Dallmann. The point was charted by the FrAE, 1903–05, under Jean-Baptiste Charcot and named by him for J. Turquet, naturalist of the expedition.

=== Brouardel Point ===
65°03′S 63°59′W. A point north of Port Charcot along the west side of the Mount Lacroix peninsula, Booth Island. First charted by the FrAE, 1903–05, and named for Doctor Brouardel, identified by Jean-Baptiste Charcot as a member of the Institut de France.

=== Cléry Peak ===
65°03′S 63°58′W. A peak, 640 metres (2,100 ft) high, on the north side of Mount Lacroix, a conspicuous massif at the north end of Booth Island. Charted by the FrAE, 1903–05, under Charcot, who named it for his father-in-law L. Cléry, an eminent French lawyer.

=== Mount Lacroix ===
65°03′S 63°58′W. A prominent mountain with red vertical cliffs and a rounded summit, 640 metres (2,100 ft) high, surmounting the northeast end of Booth Island. First charted by the FrAE, 1903–05, under Jean-Baptiste Charcot and named by him after Alfred Lacroix (1863-1948) French mineralogist and geologist; member of the scientific commission for FrAe, 1903–05 and 1908-10.

== Central features ==
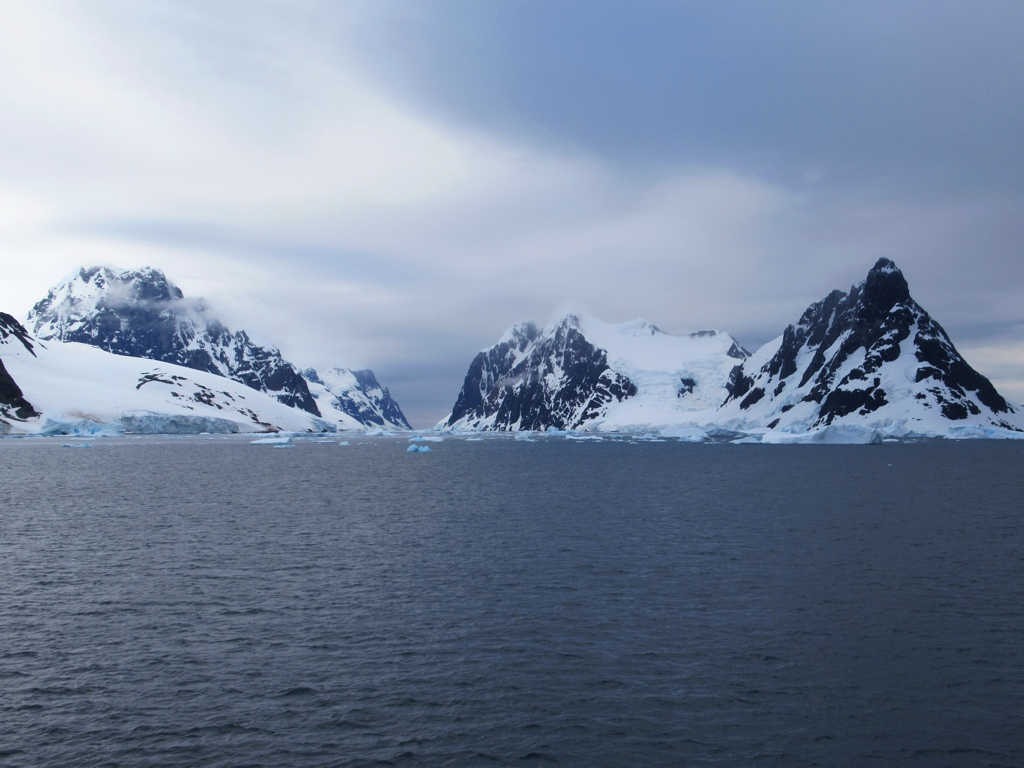
Booth Island

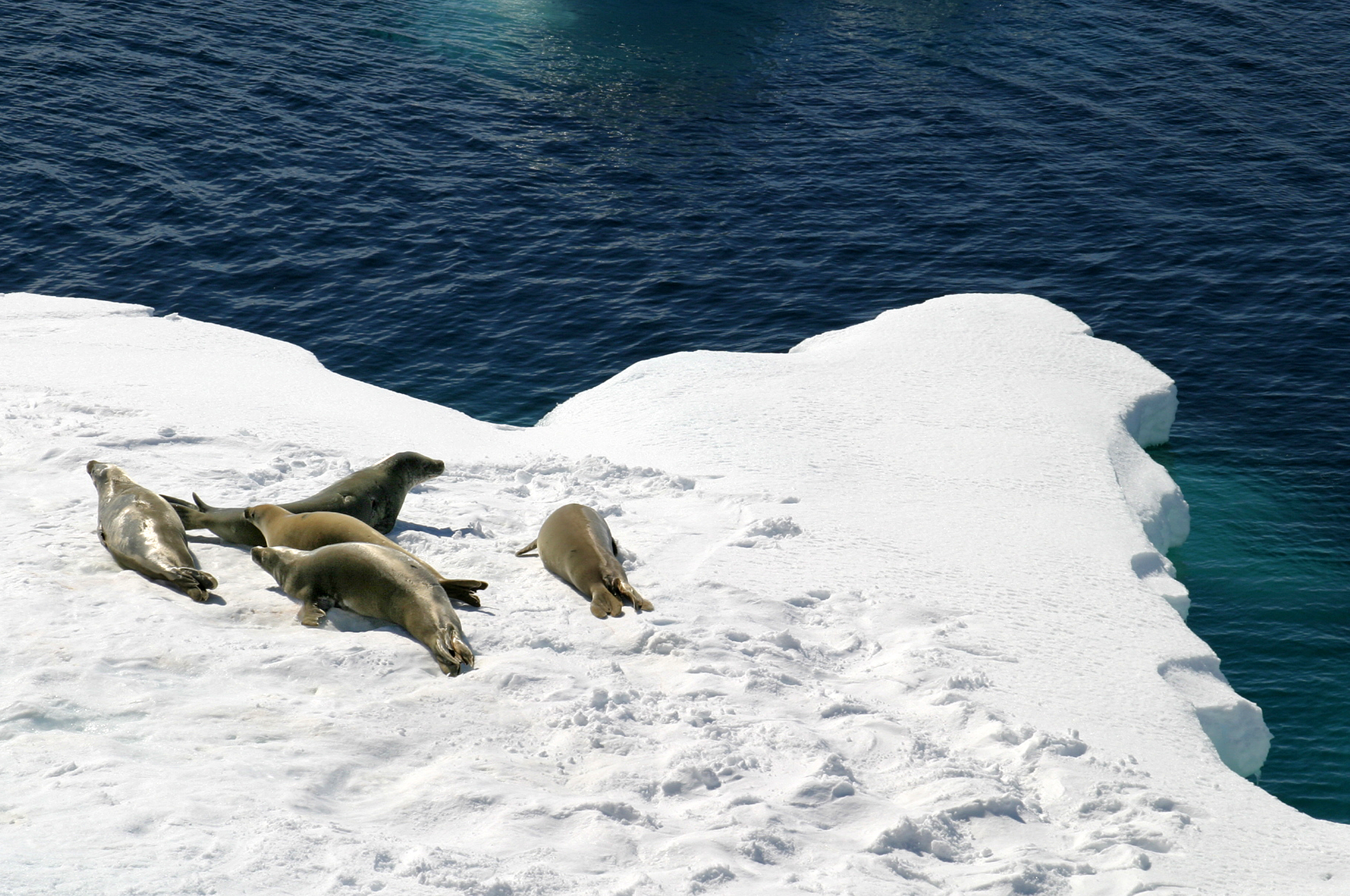
Crabeater seals on Booth Island

Features of the main body of the island include:

=== Salpêtrière Bay ===
65°04′S 64°02′W. A bay 1 nautical mile (1.9 km; 1.2 mi) wide, between Hervéou Point and Poste Point along the west side of Booth Island. First charted by the FrAE under Doctor Jean-Baptiste Charcot, 1903–05, and named by him after the Hopital de la Salpetriere, a Paris hospital where his father, Doctor Jean Martin Charcot, founded a clinic for the treatment of nervous diseases.

=== Jeanne Hill ===
65°04′S 64°01′W. A hill, 195 metres (640 ft) high, standing 0.25 nautical miles (0.46 km; 0.29 mi) northwest of Mount Guéguen and overlooking Port Charcot on Booth Island, in the Wilhelm Archipelago. Discovered by the FrAE, 1903–05, under Doctor Jean-Baptiste Charcot, and named by him for his sister.

=== Mount Guéguen ===
65°04′S 64°00′W. A sharp rocky peak, 365 metres (1,198 ft) high, standing 0.25 nautical miles (0.46 km; 0.29 mi) northwest of Louise Peak in the north part of Booth Island, in the Wilhelm Archipelago. Discovered by the FrAE, 1903–05, under Jean-Baptiste Charcot, who named it for F. Guéguen, stoker on the Français, and later the Pourquoi Pas?.

=== Louise Peak ===
65°05′S 64°00′W. Peak, 625 metres (2,051 ft) high, standing 1 nautical mile (1.9 km; 1.2 mi) north of Gourdon Peak on Booth Island. First charted by the FrAE under Jean-Baptiste Charcot, 1903–05, and named by him for the sister of Ernest Gourdon, geologist of the expedition.

=== Gourdon Peak ===
65°05′S 64°00′W. A peak 0.5 nautical miles (0.93 km; 0.58 mi) north of Wandel Peak, one of several high peaks on the N-S trending ridge of Booth Island. First charted by the FrAE, 1903–05, under Jean-Baptiste Charcot, and named by him for Ernest Gourdon, geologist of the expedition.

=== Wandel Peak ===
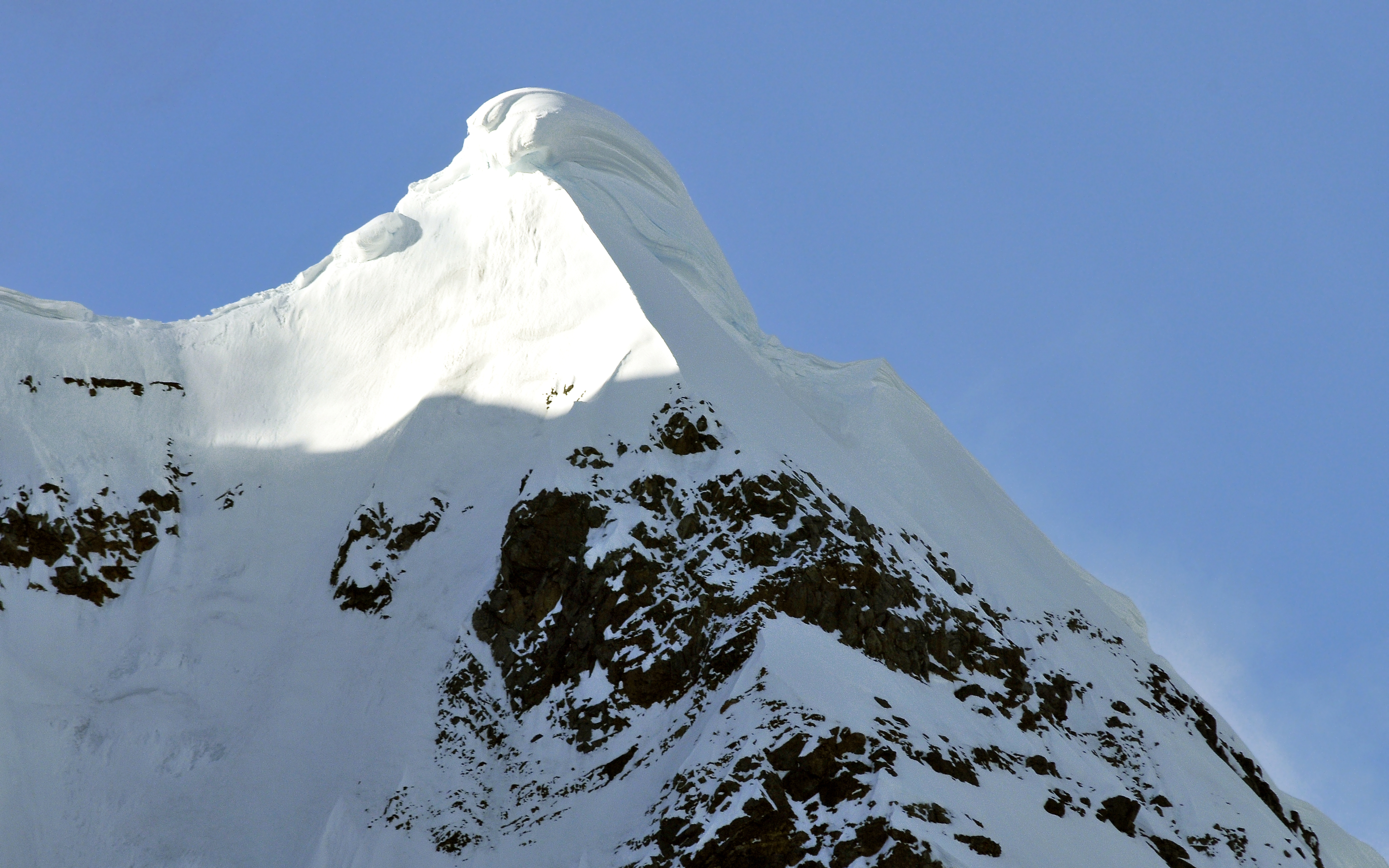
Wandel peak

65°05′S 64°00′W. A peak, 980 metres (3,220 ft) high, standing 0.5 nautical miles (0.93 km; 0.58 mi) south of Gourdon Peak and marking the highest point on Booth Island. In 1898, the BelgAE under Gerlache charted this area and applied the name "Ile Wandel" to this island which Dallmann had named Booth in 1873-74. Although Booth later became established as the name of the island, Gerlache's naming has been preserved in the name for its highest peak. Carl F. Wandel (1843-1930) was a Danish hydrographer who assisted in preparations for the Belgian expedition.

In 2003, Australian mountaineer Damien Gildea called it "one of the most challenging unclimbed objectives on the Antarctic Peninsula". On 15 February 2006 the peak was reached by a group of Spanish alpinists, who still avoided the last 10–15 metres (32.8–49.2 ft) of the mushroomlike top. In 2010, the Wandel peak was climbed for the first time to its summit (980 meters) by the French mountaineers Mathieu Cortial, Lionel Daudet and Patrick Wagnon there at the end of February 2010. Their route of ascent, called "Mystique des corniches...ons" (cornichons), this success was part of a series of ascents within the framework of the No Man's Land Expedition led by the navigator Isabelle Autissier.

=== Poste Point ===
65°05′S 64°01′W. A point on the west side of Booth Island which marks the south limit of Salpêtrière Bay. First charted by the FrAE, 1903–05, and named by Jean-Baptiste Charcot for L. Poste, stoker on the ship Français.

=== Roullin Point ===
65°07′S 64°01′W. A point marking the south tip of Booth Island. Probably first seen by the German expedition under Dallmann, 1873-74. Charted by the FrAE, 1903-05 under Jean-Baptiste Charcot, and named by him for Captain Roullin, French Navy.

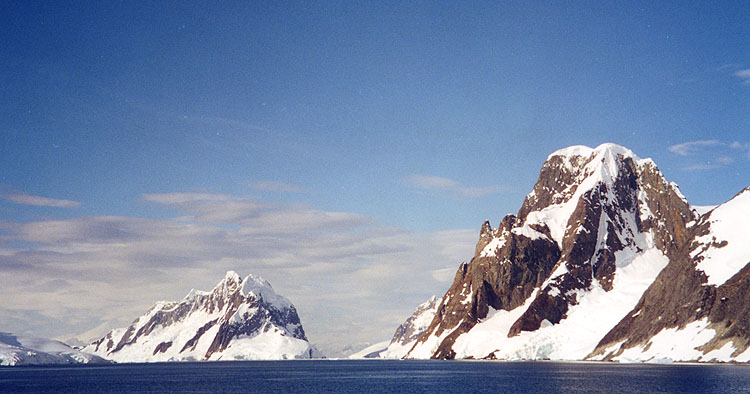
Booth Island (left) and Mount Scott (right) flanking the narrow Lemaire Channel

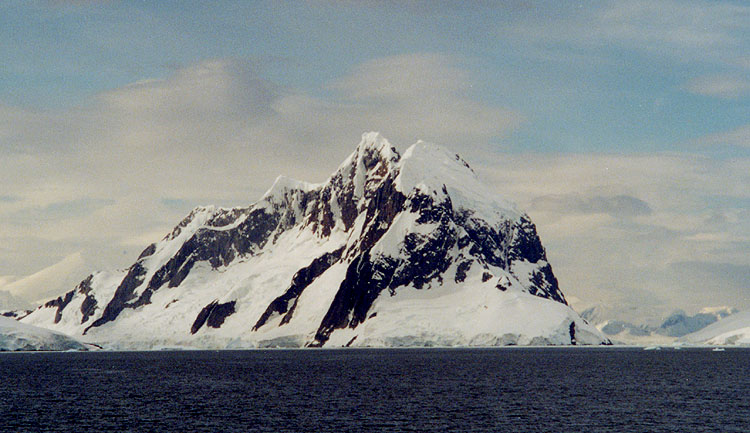
Booth Island

== Western features ==
Features of the western peninsula include, from west to east,

=== Hervéou Point ===
65°04′S 64°03′W. A point forming the west extremity of the rocky peninsula between Port Charcot and Salpetriere Bay, on the west side of Booth Island. First charted by the FrAE, 1903–05, under Jean-Baptiste Charcot, and named by him for F. Hervéou, a seaman on the Français.

=== Roland Bay ===
65°04′S 64°03′W. A cove, the south shore of which is Hervéou Point, indenting the west end of the peninsula that forms the west extremity of Booth Island. First charted by the FrAE, 1903–05, and named by Jean-Baptiste Charcot for F. Roland, a seaman on the ship Français.

=== Paumelle Point ===
65°04′S 64°03′W. A point marking the south side of the entrance to Libois Bay and the northwest end of the peninsula which forms the west extremity of Booth Island. First charted by the FrAE, 1903–05, and named by Jean-Baptiste Charcot for R. Paumelle, steward of the ship Français.

=== Libois Bay ===
65°04′S 64°03′W. Cove on the west side of Cholet Island which is entered between Rozo Point, the northwest end of Cholet Island, and Paumelle Point, the northwest end of Booth Island. First charted by the FrAE, 1903–05, and named by Charcot for F. Libois, second mechanic and carpenter of the ship Français.

=== Français Cove ===
65°04′S 64°02′W. A small cove at the west side of Port Charcot, which indents the north end of Booth Island, in the Wilhelm Archipelago. Discovered by the FrAE, 1903–05, under Jean-Baptiste Charcot, and named by him after the ship Français, which was moored in the cove during the expedition's winter operations at Port Charcot in 1904.

=== Vanssay Point ===
65°04′S 64°01′W. The extremity of a small peninsula which extends north into the west portion of Port Charcot, Booth Island. Discovered by the FrAE, 1903–05, under Jean-Baptiste Charcot, and named by him for Monsieur De Vanssay de Blavous.

=== Port Charcot ===
65°04′S 64°00′W. A bay 1.5 nautical miles (2.8 km; 1.7 mi) wide indenting the north shore of Booth Island. Charted by the FrAE, 1903–05, under Doctor Jean-Baptiste Charcot and named by him for his father, Doctor Jean Martin Charcot, famous French neurologist. Charcot established the expedition's winter base at Port Charcot in 1904.

A cairn at Port Charcot, with a wooden pillar and a plaque inscribed with the names of the members of the French expedition, has been designated a Historic Site or Monument (HSM 28), following a proposal by Argentina to the Antarctic Treaty Consultative Meeting.

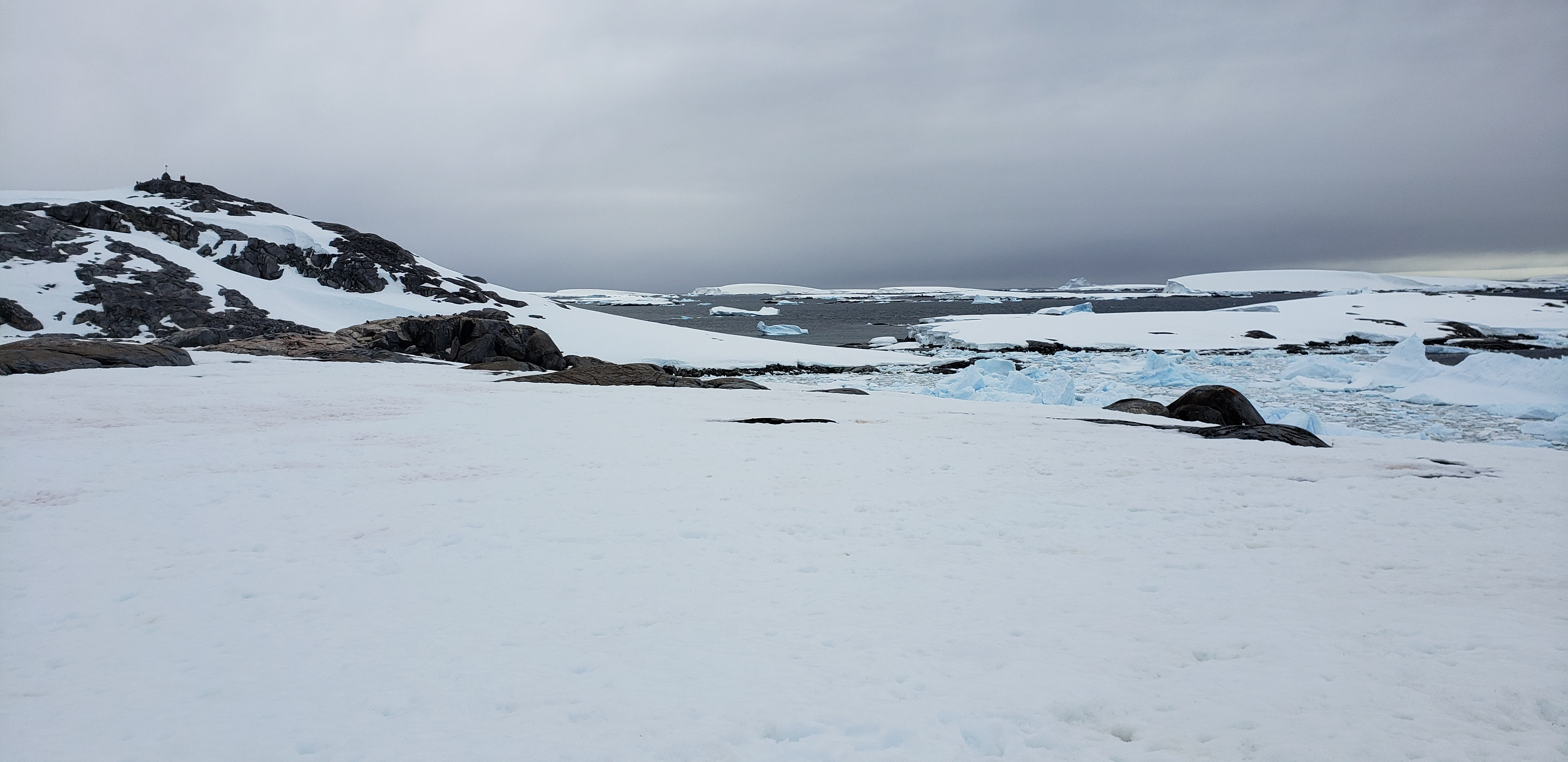
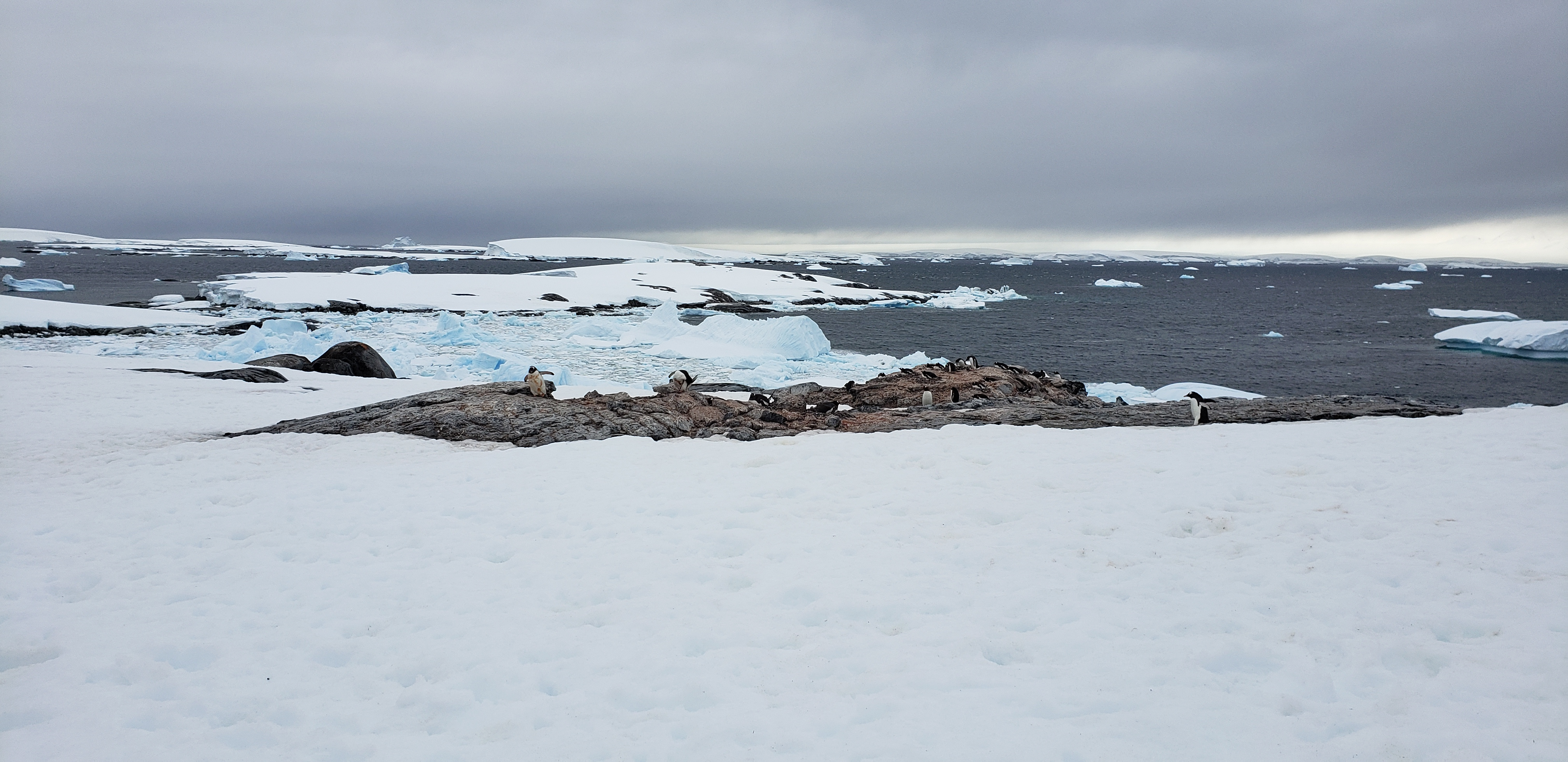
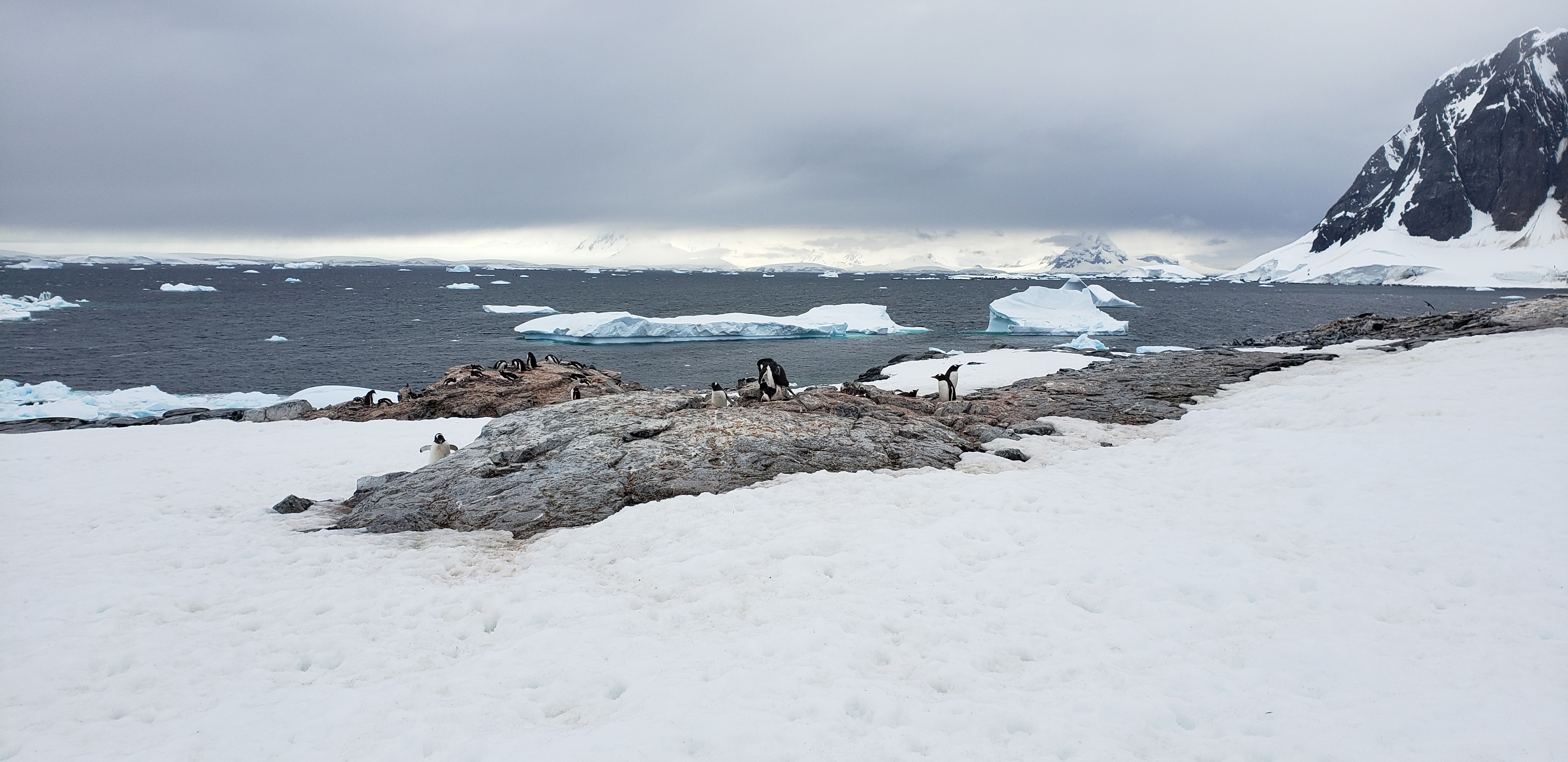
Panoramic view of Port Charcot

== Nearby features ==
Nearby features, from north to south, include:

=== Detour Island ===
65°01′S 63°55′W. An island lying 2.5 nautical miles (4.6 km; 2.9 mi) west of False Cape Renard, on the west side of Lemaire Channel in the Wilhelm Archipelago. First charted by the FrAE under Jean-Baptiste Charcot, 1903-05. So named by the UK-APC in 1959 because the island lies near the entrance to the ships' passage west of Booth Island which provides an alternative route to Lemaire Channel when the latter is blocked by ice.

=== Splitwind Island ===
65°02′S 63°56′W. An island 0.25 nautical miles (0.46 km; 0.29 mi) long, lying off the north end of Booth Island, in the Wilhelm Archipelago. Charted by the FrAE, 1903–05, and named by Jean-Baptiste Charcot for Alphonse de Rothschild. To avoid confusion with Rothschild Island near Alexander Island, the UK-APC in 1959 recommended that the name be changed to Splitwind Island. Owing to some physical peculiarity, the wind south of this island is often very different from that north of it.

=== Mumm Islands ===
65°01′S 63°59′W. A group of several small islands and rocks lying 1.5 nautical miles (2.8 km; 1.7 mi) northwest of Turquet Point, Booth Island, off the west coast of Graham Land. Discovered by the FrAE, 1903–05, under Jean-Baptiste Charcot, who applied the name.

=== Dannebrog Islands ===
65°03′S 64°08′W. A group of islands and rocks lying between the Wauwermans Islands and Vedel Islands in the Wilhelm Archipelago. The Wilhelm Archipelago was first sighted and named by a German expedition under Dallmann, 1873-74. It was resighted and named Dannebrog Islands by the BelgAE, 1897–99, under Gerlache, in appreciation of support given to Gerlache by Denmark. Dallmann's original naming has been retained for the archipelago, and the name Dannebrog restricted to the smaller group here described.

=== Rollet Island ===
65°02′S 64°03′W. A small island 1 nautical mile (1.9 km; 1.2 mi) north of the northwest part of Booth Island in the Dannebrog Islands. Discovered by the FrAE, 1903–05, under Jean-Baptiste Charcot, who named it "Ile Rollet de l'Isle" for Monsieur Rollet de I'lsle, French hydrographic surveyor. A shortened form of the original name has been adopted.

=== Rallier Channel ===
65°04′S 64°03′W. A narrow channel lying between Rallier Island and the west end of Booth Island. Discovered and named by the FrAE under Jean-Baptiste Charcot, 1903–05, in association with Rallier Island.

=== Rallier Island ===
65°04′S 64°03′W. , A small island with a small islet off its north side, lying 0.25 nautical miles (0.46 km; 0.29 mi) west of the northwest extremity of Booth Island. Discovered by the FrAE under Jean-Baptiste Charcot, 1903–05, and named by him for Raymond Rallier du Baty, merchant marine cadet who signed on as seaman on the ship Français.

=== Sögen Island ===
65°04′S 64°02′W. An island forming the east side of Français Cove, lying in the southwest extremity of Port Charcot, which indents the north part of Booth Island. Discovered by the FrAE, 1903–05, under Charcot, and named for one of the dogs which died and was buried here. The name has been approved because of its long use.

=== Cholet Island ===
65°04′S 64°02′W. A small island immediately north of the narrow peninsula which forms the west extremity of Booth Island. Discovered by the FrAE, 1903–05, under Jean-Baptiste Charcot, who named it for Ernest Cholet, skipper of the ship Français, and later, the Pourquoi-Pas?.

==== Maignan Point ====
65°03′S 64°02′W. A point marking the northeast end of Cholet Island and the west side of the entrance to Port Charcot, lying close off the northwest part of Booth Island. First charted by the FrAE, 1903–05, and named by Jean-Baptiste Charcot for F. Maignan, a seaman of the Français who lost his life in a ship accident shortly after the expedition's departure from Le Havre.

==== Rozo Point ====
65°03′S 64°03′W. A point marking the northwest end of Cholet Island, which lies close north of the northwest part of Booth Island. Discovered by the FrAE, 1903–05, and named by Jean-Baptiste Charcot for M. Rozo, the cook on the ship Français.

== Sources ==
- Alberts, Fred G., ed. (1995), Geographic Names of the Antarctic (PDF) (2 ed.), United States Board on Geographic Names This article incorporates public domain material from websites or documents of the United States Board on Geographic Names.
- Chernov, A.; Ivko, A.; Bulakh, O. (2021), "Reconnaissance GPR survey of the ice caps on islands of Wilhelm Archipelago and on Berthelot island (West Antarctica) s", Geophysical Journal, 43 (6): 266–280, doi:10.24028/gzh.v43i6.251567
- "Curnon granulosa (Vayssière, 1906)", MolluscaBase, World Register of Marine Species, 2019
- Gildea, Damien (2003), Harlin (ed.), "Climbs and Expeditions: Antarctic Peninsula, Summary of Activities", American Alpine Journal, vol. 77, no. 45, p. 335
- Graham Land and South Shetland Islands, BAS: British Antarctic Survey, 2005
- List of Historic Sites and Monuments approved by the ATCM (2012) (PDF), Antarctic Treaty Secretariat, 2012
- Sailing Directions for Antarctica: Includes Islands South of Latitude 60.̊, United States. Defense Mapping Agency. Hydrographic Center, 1976 This article incorporates public domain material from websites or documents of the National Geospatial-Intelligence Agency.
- Tamayo, José Carlos (2006), "Antarctica, Antarctic Peninsula, Mt. Shackleton, South Face-West Ridge; Wandel Peak, North Ridge to Summit Mushroom", in Harlin, John III (ed.), American Alpine Journal, vol. 48, Seattle: Mountaineers Books, p. 294, ISBN 1-933056-01-0, archived from the original on 10 December 2020
- Wägele, H.; Barnes, D. K. A.; Bullough, L. W. (1995), "Redescription of Charcotia granulosa Vayssière, 1906 (Nudibranchia: Arminoidea: Charcotiidae) from Signy Island, Antarctica", Journal of Molluscan Studies, 61 (2): 197–207, doi:10.1093/mollus/61.2.197
