= Wilhelm Archipelago =

Archipelago off the coast of the Antarctic Peninsula

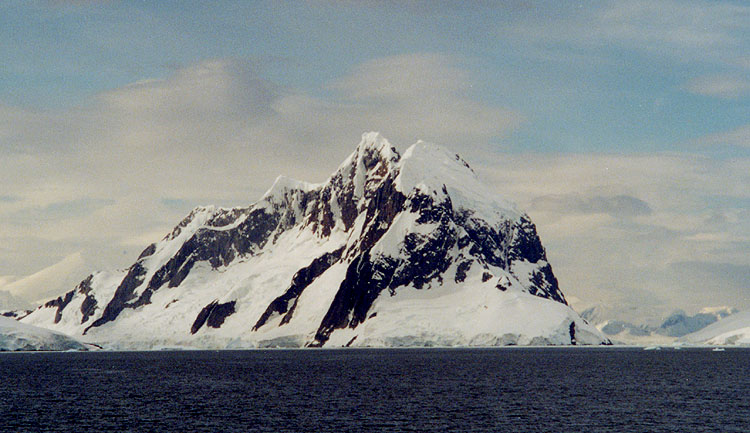
- Booth Island from the south, Lemaire Channel barely visible on the right

- Location within Antarctica

Geography
- Location: Antarctica
- Coordinates: 65°8′S 64°20′W

Administration
- Administered under the Antarctic Treaty System

Demographics
- Population: Uninhabited

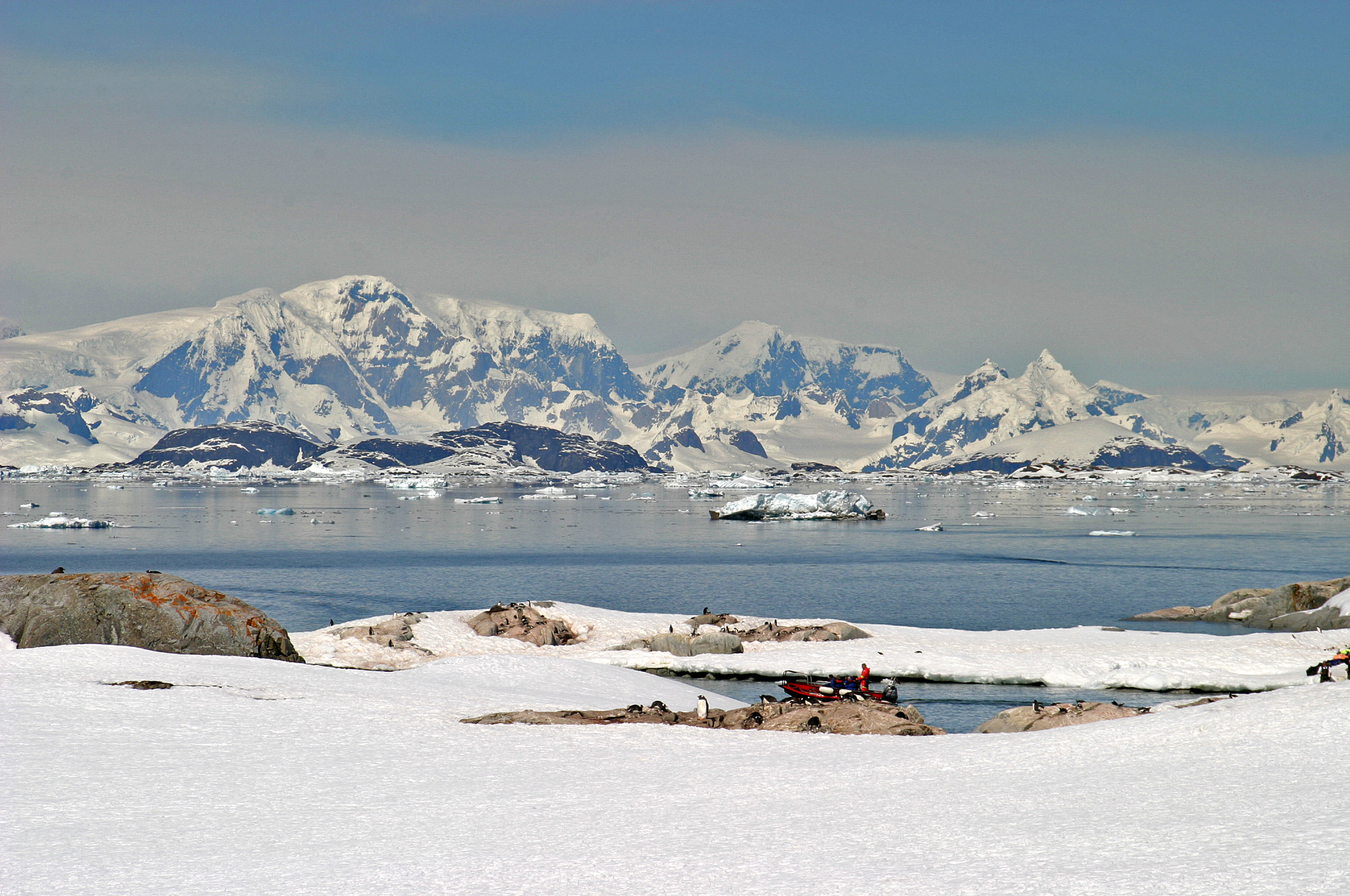
Wilhelm Archipelago

The Wilhelm Archipelago is an island archipelago off the west coast of the Antarctic Peninsula in Antarctica.

Wilhelm Archipelago consists of numerous islands, the largest of which are Booth Island and Hovgaard Island. The archipelago extends from Bismarck Strait southwest to Lumus Rock, off the west coast of Graham Land. It was discovered by a German expedition under Eduard Dallmann, 1873–74. He named them for Wilhelm I, then German Emperor and King of Prussia.

== Island groups ==
- Anagram Islands
- Argentine Islands
- Betbeder Islands
- Cruls Islands
- Dannebrog Islands
- Myriad Islands
- Roca Islands
- Vedel Islands
- Wauwermans Islands
- Yalour Islands

== See also ==
- Ambrose Rocks
- Bradley Rock
- Guéguen Point
- Petermann Island
- Southwind Passage
