= Plata Passage =

Plata Passage or Admiral Merino Channel (64°40′S 62°1′W) is a passage in Wilhelmina Bay, separating Brooklyn Island from the west coast of Graham Land. It was first charted by the Belgian Antarctic Expedition under Gerlache, 1897–99, and named after the estuary between Argentina and Uruguay in recognition of the services rendered to the expedition by the people of Argentina.
