= Arctowski Peninsula =

Peninsula in Antarctica

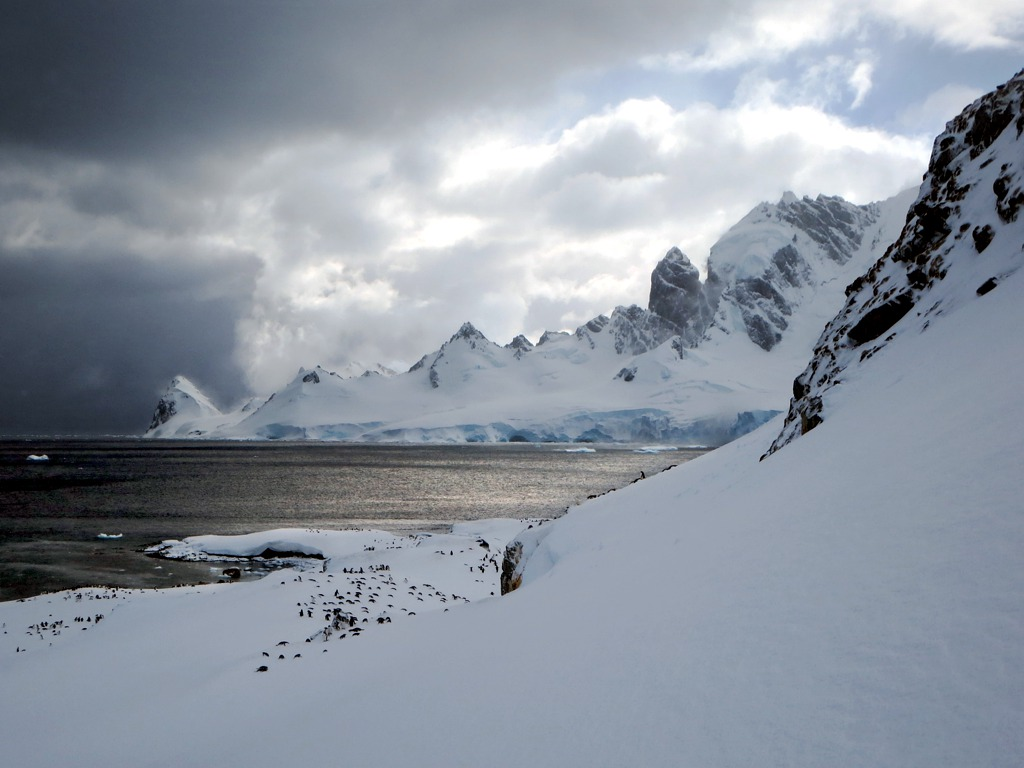
- Gentoo penguins dot a plateau on Cuverville Island overlooking Arctowski Peninsula

- Location within Antarctica

Geography
- Location: Gerlache Strait
- Coordinates: 64°45′S 62°25′W

The Arctowski Peninsula (64°45′S 62°25′W) is a peninsula, 15 nautical miles (28 km; 17 mi) long in a north-south direction, lying between Andvord Bay and Wilhelmina Bay on the west coast of Graham Land, Antarctica.

== Location ==
Danco Coast, Antarctic Peninsula. Arctowski Peninsula in center

The Arctowski Peninsula is on the Danco Coast on the west of the Antarctic Peninsula. It extends in a north-northwest direction from the Forbidden Plateau to the south into the Gerlache Strait to the north. Wilhelmina Bay is to the east. Across the Gerlache Strait the end of the peninsula faces the Solvay Mountains on Brabant Island to the north, and the Osterrieth Range on Anvers Island to the northwest. Rongé Island is west of the northwest side of the peninsula. The Laussedat Heights on the southwest side of the peninsula look over Andvord Bay to the west. The peninsula extends southeast to a line defined by Arago Glacier, which flows south into Henryk Cove, and Woodbury Glacier, which flows north into Piccard Cove.

Northern features include Cape Anna, Mount Fourcade, Orne Harbour, Spigot Peak, Selvick Cove, Zeiss Needle, Sable Pinnacles (Noire Rock) and Henryk Peak. Central features include Wild Spur, Henryk Glacier, Pulfrich Peak, Hubl Peak and Stolze Peak. Southern features include Porro Bluff, Orel Ice Fringe, Laussedat Heights, Deville Glacier, Scheimpflug Nunatak, Fliess Glacier (flowing into Neko Harbour) and The Downfall.

== Geology ==
On the west coast of the Arctowski Peninsula, and the islands lying to the west, there are three main groups of exposed rocks. Permian(?) – Triassic metasediments of the Trinity Peninsula Group, Early Cretaceous lavas, agglomerates and tuffs of the Antarctic Peninsula Volcanic Group, and Mid-Cretaceous adamellite, granite, granodiorite, diorite, tonalite and gabbro plutons of the Andean Intrusive Suite. There are also basic and acid hypabyssal dykes that may date to the Late Cretaceous.

== Discovery and name ==
The Arctowski Peninsula was discovered by the Belgian Antarctic Expedition (BelgAE), 1897–99, under Adrien de Gerlache. The name, for Henryk Arctowski of that expedition, was suggested by the United States Advisory Committee on Antarctic Names (US-ACAN) for this previously unnamed feature.

== Northern features ==
Northern features include, from north to south:

=== Anna Cove ===
64°35′S 62°26′W. A cove immediately east of Cape Anna at the north end of Arctowski Peninsula. Charted by the BelgAE on January 30, 1898, and named in association with Cape Anna.

=== Mount Fourcade ===
64°36′S 62°30′W. Mountain standing 2 nautical miles (3.7 km; 2.3 mi) southwest of Cape Anna. Charted by the BelgAE under Gerlache, 1897-99. Named by the UK-APC in 1960 for H.G. Fourcade, South African surveyor who designed the stereogoniometer and gave it practical application for plotting photogrammetric surveys in about 1900.

=== Orne Harbor ===
64°37′S 62°32′W. Cove 1 nautical mile (1.9 km; 1.2 mi) wide, indenting the west coast of Graham Land 2 nautical miles (3.7 km; 2.3 mi) southwest of Cape Anna. Discovered by the BelgAE under Gerlache in 1898. The name Orne Harbor was probably in use by Norwegian whalers, because it was used by Scottish geologist David Ferguson following his geologic reconnaissance of this area aboard the whaler Hanka in 1913.

=== Spigot Peak ===
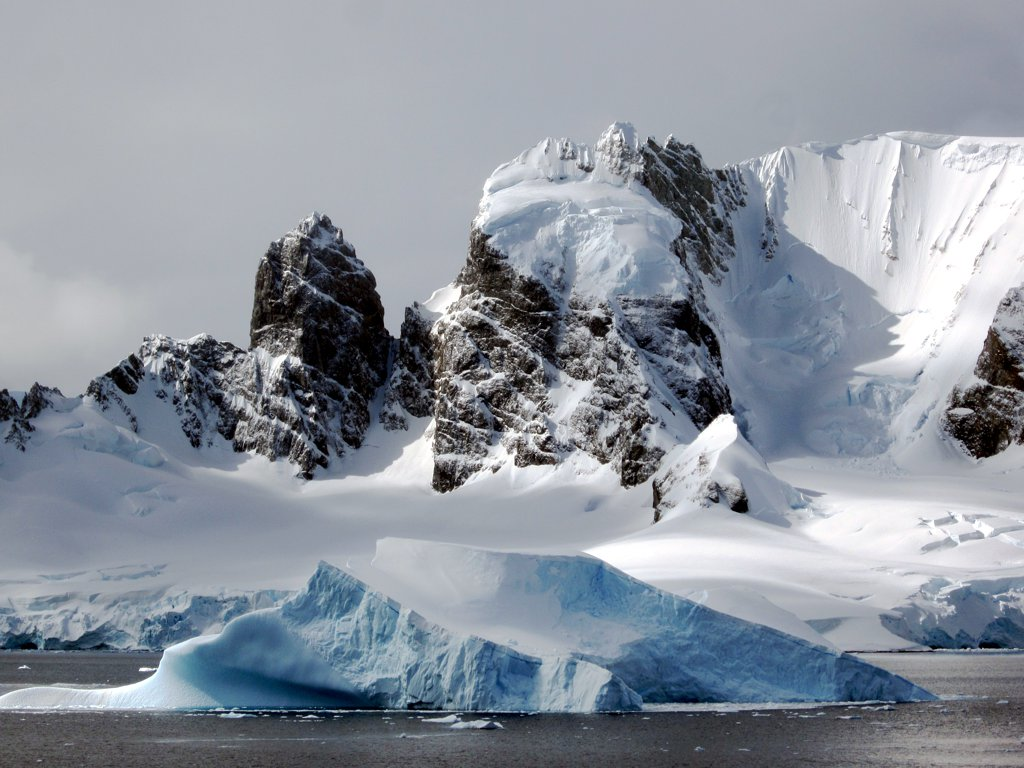
Spigot Peak

64°38′S 62°34′W. A conspicuous black peak 285 metres (935 ft) high, marking the south side of the entrance to Orne Harbor. Shown on an Argentine government chart of 1950. The name, given by the UK Antarctic Place-Names Committee (UK-APC) in 1956, is descriptive of the appearance of the feature; a spigot is a wooden peg.

=== Lagarrigue Cove ===
64°39′S 62°34′W. A small cove south of Spigot Peak, Errera Channel, on the Danco Cast. The name was proposed by the Argentine navy and was approved by the Argentine geographical coordinating commission in 1956 to replace the provisional name "Puerto Lote.| Named in memory of a navy cook with the Argentine Antarctic Expedition of 1947-48 who perished in a crevasse accident in the vicinity. Called "Selvick Cove" by the United Kingdom.

=== Sophie Rocks ===
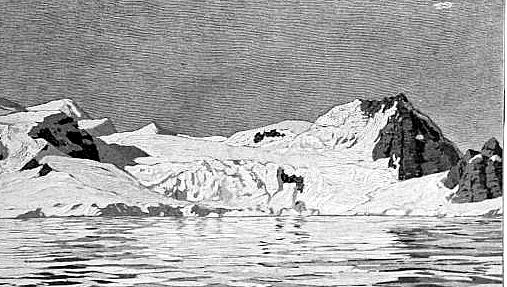
Sophie Rocks on the Danco Coast of Graham Land on the Antarctic Peninsula, from Cook's Through the First Antarctic Night, 1898–1899

64°39′00″S 62°33′00″W. A small group of land rocks, midway between Spigot Peak and Zeiss Needle [Mount Dedo], overlooking Selvick Cove to the W, and Orne Harbour to the E, Arctowski Peninsula. First seen and named by the Belgian Antarctic Expedition 1898, the name Roches Sophie was shown on Lecointe map 1899. However Frederick Albert Cook M.D. a member of the same expedition used the name Sophie Rocks, and it was decided to name this feature Sophie Rocks to retain the use of the name in this area.

=== Mount Dedo ===
64°39′S 62°33′W. Conspicuous needle-like peak, 695 metres (2,280 ft) high, standing south of Orne Harbor on the west coast of Graham Land. Charted by the BelgAE under Gerlache, 1897–99. The name appears on an Argentine government chart of 1954 and is descriptive, "dedo" meaning finger in Spanish. Called "Zeiss Needle" by the United Kingdom.

=== Vidbol Glacier ===
64°40′00″S 62°29′40″W. A 5.5 kilometres (3.4 mi) long and 1.5 kilometres (0.93 mi) wide glacier on Arctowski Peninsula draining the north slopes of Pulfrich Peak. Flowing northwestwards west of Henryk Peak and east of Mount Dedo to enter Gerlache Strait at Orne Harbour. Named after the Vidbol River in Northwestern Bulgaria.

=== Noire Rock ===
64°40′S 62°35′W. A dark pinnacle rock 1.5 nautical miles (2.8 km; 1.7 mi) southwest of Mount Dedo. Charted and descriptively named (noire means black) by the BelgAE under Gerlache in 1898.

=== Henryk Peak ===
64°40′00″S 62°27′30″W. A prominent peak in the northern part of the main ridge of Arctowski Peninsula. Named after Henryk Arctowski, member of the 1897-1899 Belgian Antarctic Expedition.

== Central features ==
Central features include, from north to south:

=== Pulfrich Peak ===
64°41′S 62°28′W. A peak near the east part of Wild Spur on Arctowski Peninsula, on the west coast of Graham Land. Mapped by the Falkland Islands Dependencies Survey (FIDS) from photos taken by Hunting Aerosurveys Ltd. in 1956-57. Named by the UK-APC in 1960 for Carl Pulfrich (1858-1927), "father of stereophotogrammetry,|who independently developed a stereocomparator in 1901 and developed the principle of the "floating mark|established by Franz Stolze.

=== Wild Spur ===
64°42′S 62°32′W. Spur extending from Pulfrich Peak to the west side of Arctowski Peninsula. Shown on an Argentine government chart of 1957. Named by the UK-APC in 1960 for Heinrich Wild (1833-1902), Swiss instrument designer responsible for the autograph, first used about 1924 for stereosurvey from ground stations and later adapted for air survey.

=== Henryk Glacier ===
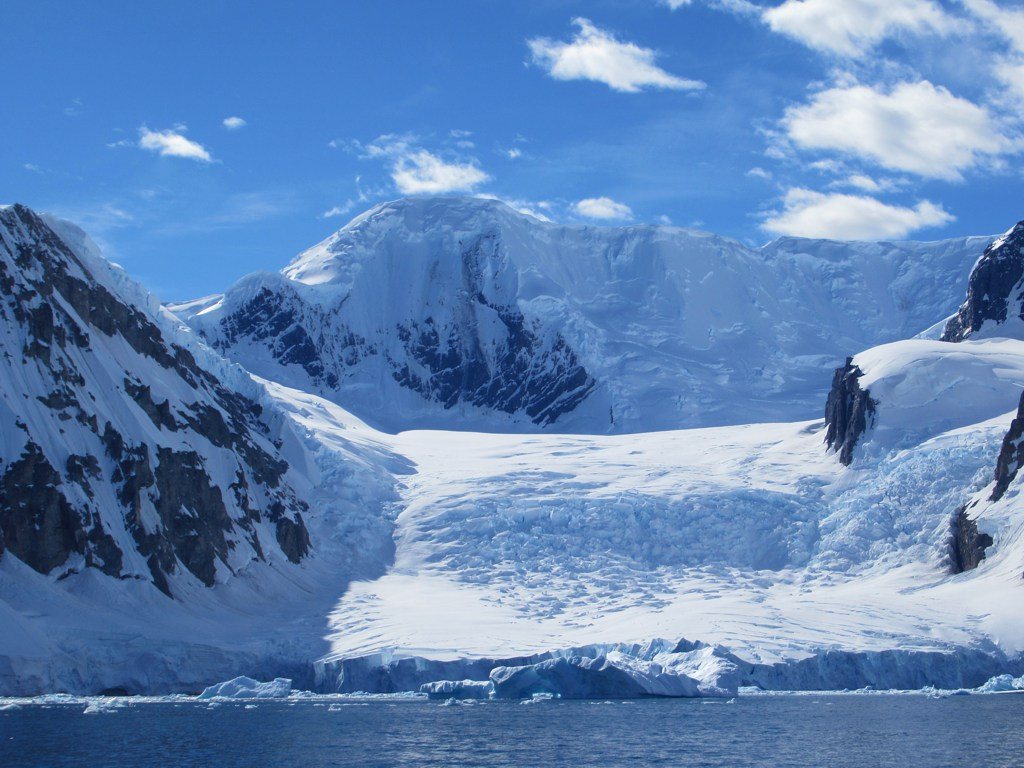
Henryk Glacier

64°42′00″S 62°30′00″W. A glacier on the Arctowski Peninsula with a noteworthy cirque at the head. It flows southwest between Wild Spur and Hübl Peak into Errera Channel. Named in association with the peninsula after Henryk Arctowski by the Polish Antarctic Expedition, about 1993.

=== Stolze Peak ===
64°43′S 62°26′W. Peak on Arctowski Peninsula near the head of Beaupré Cove. Mapped by the FIDS from photos taken by Hunting Aerosurveys Ltd. in 1956-57. Named by the UK-APC in 1960 for Franz Stolze, a German scientist who in 1881 suggested improvements in methods of air photography and, in 1892, first established the principle of the "floating mark|used in stereophotogrammetry, later developed by Pulfrich.

=== Hübl Peak ===
64°43′S 62°29′W. A peak west of Stolze Peak on Arctowski Peninsula. Mapped by the FIDS from photos taken by Hunting Aerosurveys Ltd. in 1956-57. Named by the UK-APC in 1960 for Arthur Freiherr von Hübl (1853-1932), Austrian surveyor, head of the topographic section of the Militargeographische Institut, Vienna, who in 1894 designed a stereocomparator which was developed independently by Doctor Carl Pulfrich in 1901.

== Southern features ==
Southern features include,

=== Wheatstone Glacier ===
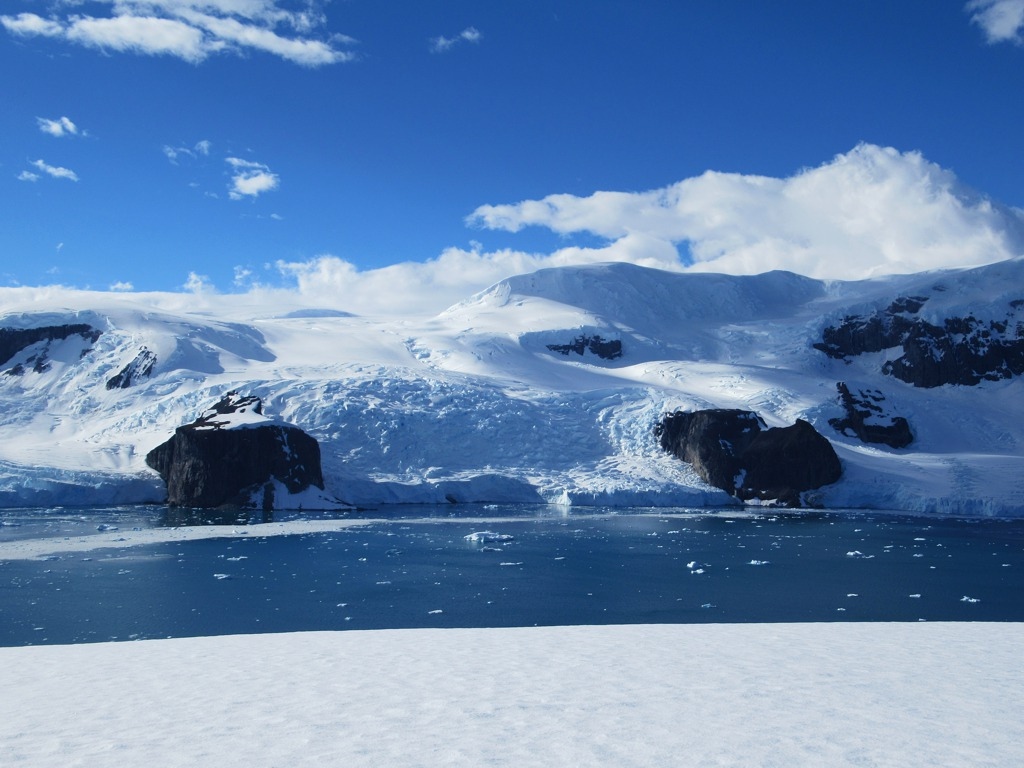
Wheatstone Glacier

64°44′S 62°31′W. A glacier on the west coast of Graham Land. It enters Errera Channel east of Danco Island. Charted by the BelgAE under Gerlache, 1897-99. Named by the UK-APC in 1960 for Sir Charles Wheatstone (1802-75), English scientist and inventor who designed the first mirror stereoscope in 1832.

=== Birdsend Bluff ===
64°45′S 62°33′W. Rocky bluff at the south side of the mouth of Wheatstone Glacier. First roughly surveyed by the BelgAE under Gerlache, 1897-99. The name originated when two members of the FIDS were camped immediately below this bluff in May 1956 and a fall of rock from the bluff flattened a bird outside their tent.

=== Porro Bluff ===
64°45′S 62°33′W. Bluff lying south of Birdsend Bluff and overlooking Errera Channel. Shown on an Argentine government chart of 1950. Named by the UK-APC in 1960 for Ignazio Porro (1795-1875), Italian engineer who in 1851 invented a prism combination, important in the development of stereo-plotting instruments.

=== Orel Ice Fringe ===
64°46′S 62°36′W. A strip of coastal ice bordering the south side of Errera Channel between Beneden Head and Porro Bluff. Mapped by the FIDS from photos taken by Hunting Aerosurveys Ltd. in 1956-57. Named by the UK-APC in 1960 for Eduard von Orel (1877-1941), Austrian surveyor who in 1905 designed the first stereoautograph for plotting maps directly from horizontal photographs.

=== Deville Glacier ===
64°48′S 62°35′W. Glacier flowing along the south side of Laussedat Heights into Andvord Bay. The glacier is shown on an Argentine government chart of 1952. Named by the UK-APC in 1960 for Edouard G. Deville (1849-1924), Surveyor General of Canada, 1885-1924, who introduced and developed photogrammetric methods of survey in Canada from 1888 onward.

=== Scheimpflug Nunatak ===
64°48′S 62°36′W. Nunatak in the mouth of Deville Glacier on Arctowski Peninsula. Mapped by the FIDS from photos taken by Hunting Aerosurveys Ltd. in 1956-57. Named by the UK-APC in 1960 for Theodor Scheimpflug (1865-1911), Austrian pioneer of aerophotogrammetry.

=== Laussedat Heights ===
64°47′S 62°30′W. A series of elevations extending eastward for 8 nautical miles (15 km; 9.2 mi) in the southwest part of Arctowski Peninsula. Mapped by the FIDS from photos taken by Hunting Aerosurveys Ltd. in 1956-57. Named by the UK-APC in 1960 for Aimé Laussedat (1819-1907), French military engineer, the "father of photogrammetry," who pioneered the application of photography to survey from about 1851 onward.

=== Nadjakov Glacier ===
64°45′10″S 62°23′20″W. A 5.5 kilometres (3.4 mi) long and 2 kilometres (1.2 mi) wide glacier on Arctowski Peninsula draining north-northeastwards to enter the head of Beaupré Cove east of Stolze Peak. Named after the Bulgarian physicist Georgi Nadjakov (1897-1981) who discovered the photoelectret state essential to modern photocopying.

=== The Downfall ===
64°48′S 62°23′W. A mountain (c. 1,500 metres (4,900 ft) high) between the heads of Arago Glacier and Woodbury Glacier. Mapped by the FIDS from photos taken by Hunting Aerosurveys Ltd. in 1956-57. So named by the UK-APC in 1960 because the feature marked the end of the route from Orel Ice Fringe by which members of the FIDS at Danco Island station had hoped in 1956 to reach Forbidden Plateau. A very steep drop on the east side of the summit precludes further progress.

== Sources ==
- Alberts, Fred G., ed. (1995), Geographic Names of the Antarctic (PDF) (2 ed.), United States Board on Geographic Names This article incorporates public domain material from websites or documents of the United States Board on Geographic Names.
- Birkenmajer, Krzystof (1995), "Geology of Gerlache Strait, West Antarctica. I. Arctowski Peninsula" (PDF), Polish Polar Research, 16 (1–2): 47–60
- Cook, Frederick A (1900), Through the First Antarctic Night, 1898–1899
- Graham Land and South Shetland Islands, BAS: British Antarctic Survey, 2005
- "Henryk Glacier", Composite Gazetteer of Antarctica, Scientific Committee on Antarctic Research
- "Henryk Peak", Composite Gazetteer of Antarctica, Scientific Committee on Antarctic Research
- "Nadjakov Glacier", Composite Gazetteer of Antarctica, Scientific Committee on Antarctic Research
- "Selvick Cove", Composite Gazetteer of Antarctica, Scientific Committee on Antarctic Research
- "Sophie Rocks", Composite Gazetteer of Antarctica, Scientific Committee on Antarctic Research
- "Vidbol Glacier", Composite Gazetteer of Antarctica, Scientific Committee on Antarctic Research
- "Zeiss Needle", Composite Gazetteer of Antarctica, Scientific Committee on Antarctic Research
