= Reclus Peninsula =

Peninsula in Antarctica

- Location within Antarctica

Geography
- Location: Gerlache Strait
- Coordinates: 64°33′S 61°47′W

Reclus Peninsula (64°33′S 61°47′W) is a 7 nautical miles (13 km; 8.1 mi) peninsula on the west coast of Graham Land, Antarctica. It borders Charlotte Bay to its east.

== Location ==
Danco Coast, Antarctic Peninsula. Eurydice Peninsula in center

The Recluse Peninsula lies on the west coast of the Antarctic Peninsula. It extends northward into the Gerlache Strait between Charlotte Bay to the east and Wilhelmina Bay to the west. Nansen Island is to the west. The Forbidden Plateau is to the southwest, and the Foster Plateau is to the southeast.

== Mapping and name ==
The Reclus Peninsula was first charted in 1898 by the Belgian Antarctic Expedition under Adrien de Gerlache, who named its northern extremity "Cap Reclus" for the French geographer and author Élisée Reclus (1830–1905). The UK Antarctic Place-Names Committee (UK-APC) extended the name Reclus to the entire peninsula in 1960.

== Features ==
Features include, from north to south:

=== Portal Point ===
64°30′S 61°46′W. Narrow point in the northeast part of the Reclus Peninsula, on the west coast of Graham Land. In 1956, a Falkland Islands Dependencies Survey (FIDS) hut was established on the point, from which a route to the plateau was established. So named by the UK-APC in 1960 because the point is the "gateway|of the route.

=== Jacques Peaks ===
64°31′S 61°51′W. Peaks rising to 385 metres (1,263 ft) high at the northwest end of the Reclus Peninsula. Shown on an Argentine government chart of 1954. Named by the UK-APC in 1960 for Greville L. Jacques, senior helicopter pilot with the Falkland Islands and Dependencies Aerial Survey Expedition (FIDASE), 1955-57, who made a landing on one of these peaks to establish a survey station. The peaks are the most conspicuous feature on the Reclus Peninsula.

=== Igloo Hill ===
64°33′S 61°47′W. A completely ice-covered hill, 280 metres (920 ft) high, in the central part of Reclus Peninsula. Shown on an Argentine government chart of 1954. Given this descriptive name by the UK-APC in 1960.

=== Harris Peak ===
64°36′S 61°47′W. A peak, 1,005 metres (3,297 ft) high, surmounting the base of Reclus Peninsula on the west coast of Graham Land. Mapped by the FIDS from photos taken by Hunting Aerosurveys Ltd. in 1956-57. Named by the UK-APC in 1960 for Leslie Harris, FIDS carpenter and general assistant at the Danco Island station in 1956, who participated in the reconnaissance journeys from that station and from the nearby Portal Point hut.

== Nearby features ==
=== Gaston Islands ===
64°28′S 61°50′W. Two islands and off-lying rocks 1 nautical mile (1.9 km; 1.2 mi) northwest of the tip of Reclus Peninsula. First charted in 1898 by the BelgAE under Lieutenant Adrien de Gerlache, who named one of the islands for his brother Gaston. The name was extended to apply to the entire group by the UK-APC in 1960.

=== Bancroft Bay ===
64°34′S 61°52′W. Bay lying between Charlotte and Wilhelmina Bays, along the west coast of Graham Land. The bay was first roughly indicated by the BelgAE under Gerlache, 1897-99. It was remapped by the FIDS from air photos taken by the FIDASE, 1955-57. Named by the UK-APC in 1960 for Anthony D. Bancroft, senior surveyor of the latter expedition.

=== Bayly Glacier ===
64°37′S 61°50′W. A Glacier flows into the head of Bancroft Bay, on the west coast of Graham Land. Mapped by the FIDS from photos taken by Hunting Aerosurveys Ltd. in 1956-57. Named by the UK-APC in 1960 for Maurice B. Bayly, FIDS geologist at the Danco Island station in 1956, who with L. Harris, pioneered the route from the Portal Point hut (on nearby Reclus Peninsula) to the plateau in February 1957.

=== Cañón Point ===
64°34′S 61°55′W. Point marking the southwest side of the entrance to Bancroft Bay, on the west coast of Graham Land. First roughly charted by the BelgAE under Gerlache, 1897-99. The name appears on an Argentine government chart of 1954.

=== Zapato Point ===
64°36′S 61°58′W. Point 3 nautical miles (5.6 km; 3.5 mi) southwest of Cañón Point on the west coast of Graham Land. First seen by the BelgAE under Gerlache, which sailed between the point and Brooklyn Island, on February |7, 1898. The name appears on an Argentine government chart of 1954.

=== Café Point ===
64°39′S 61°59′W. Point lying 2 nautical miles (3.7 km; 2.3 mi) south of Zapato Point and 2 nautical miles (3.7 km; 2.3 mi) east of Nansen Island on the west coast of Graham Land. Charted by the BelgAE under Gerlache 1897-99. The name appears on an Argentine government chart of 1954.

== Sources ==
- Alberts, Fred G., ed. (1995), Geographic Names of the Antarctic (PDF) (2 ed.), United States Board on Geographic Names This article incorporates public domain material from websites or documents of the United States Board on Geographic Names.
- Graham Land and South Shetland Islands, BAS: British Antarctic Survey, 2005
