= Useful Island =

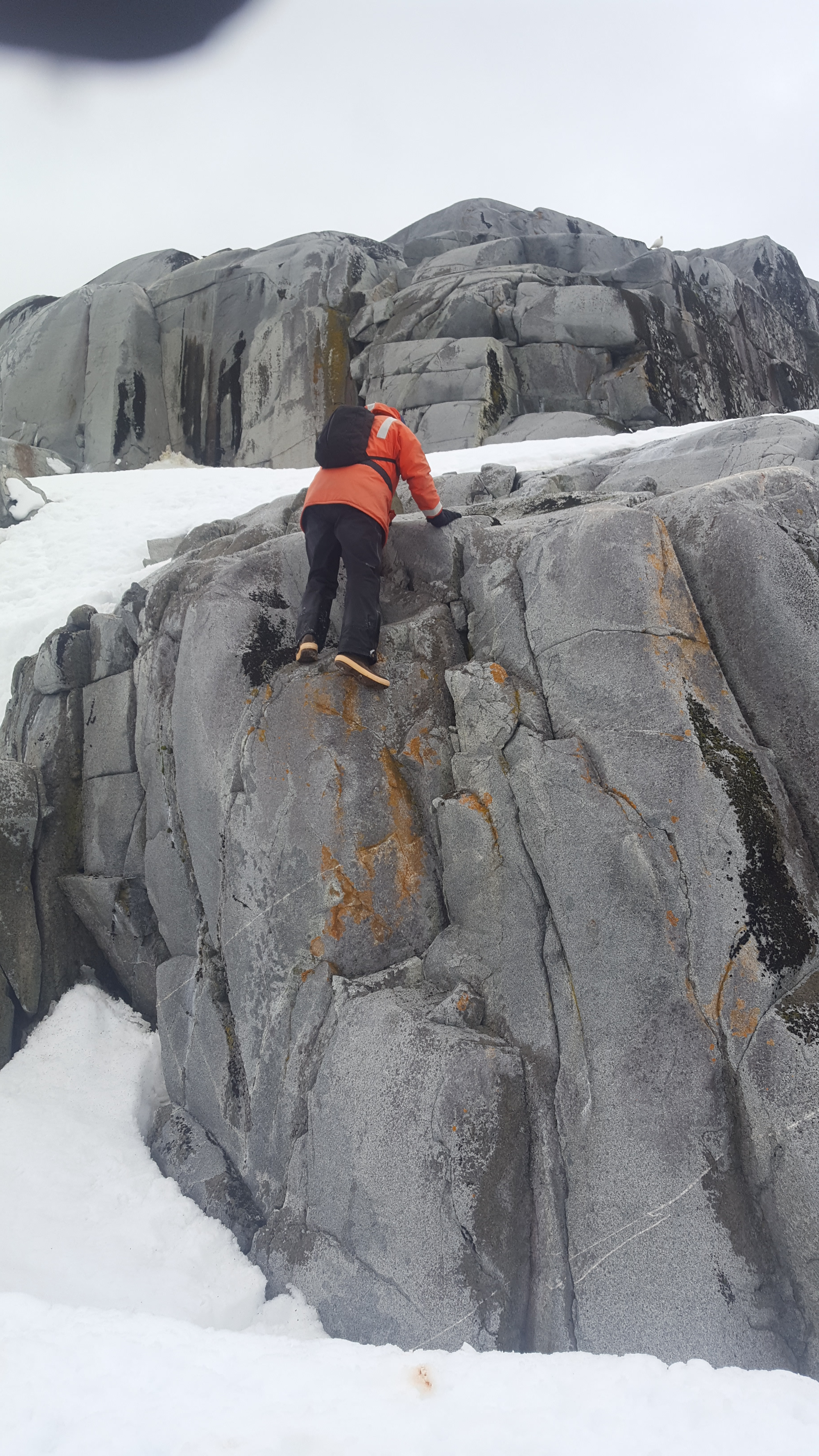

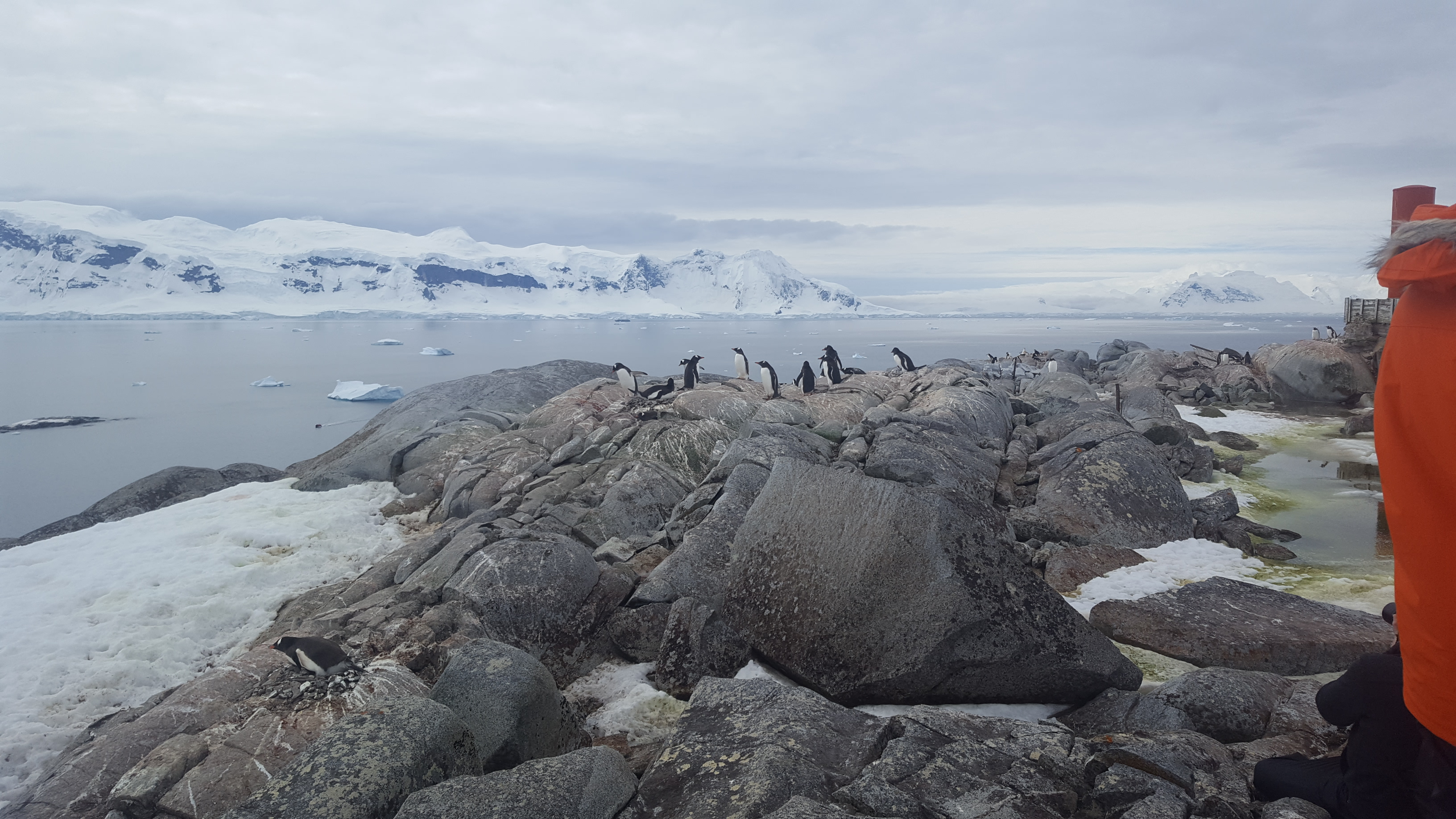

Useful Island (64°43′S 62°52′W) is an island 3.2 km (2 miles) west of Rongé Island, with a string of rocks between, lying in Gerlache Strait off the west coast of Graham Land. It was discovered by the Belgian Antarctic Expedition, 1897–99, under Adrien de Gerlache. The name appears on a chart based upon a 1927 survey by Discovery Investigations personnel on the RRS Discovery.

== Geography ==
The bedrock is Mesozoic granite.

== Bird Life ==
Gentoo and chinstrap penguins have rookeries on the top of the island.

== See also ==
- List of Antarctic and sub-Antarctic islands
