= Piccard Cove =

Cove on the west coast of Graham Land, Antarctica.[1]

- Location within Antarctica
- Coordinates: 64°45′S 62°19′W

Piccard Cove (64°45′S 62°19′W) is a cove forming the southernmost part of Wilhelmina Bay, along the west coast of Graham Land, Antarctica.

== Location ==
Danco Coast, Antarctic Peninsula. Wilhelmina Bay in center

Wilhelmina Bay is on the Danco Coast on the west side of the Antarctic Peninsula. Piccard Cove in the south of Wilhelmina Bay is bordered by the Arctowski Peninsula to the northwest and Forbidden Plateau to the northeast. To the north, Wilhelmina Bay opens into the Gerlache Strait.

== Mapping and name ==
Piccard Cove was charted by the Belgian Antarctic Expedition (BelgAE) under Adrien de Gerlache, 1897–99. It was named by the UK Antarctic Place-Names Committee (UK-APC) in 1960 for Auguste Piccard, Swiss physicist, stratosphere pioneer who reached a height of 9.5 nautical miles (17.6 km; 10.9 mi) in a hydrogen-filled balloon in 1931.

== Features ==
Features, clockwise from the east, include

=== Sophie Cliff ===
64°44′S 62°15′W. Conspicuous granite cliff at the east side of the entrance to Piccard Cove, Wilhelmina Bay, on the west coast of Graham Land. First charted and named by the BelgAE under Gerlache in 1898.

=== Balis Ridge ===
64°46′43.0″S 62°08′39.0″W. A rocky, partly ice-covered ridge extending 7 kilometres (4.3 mi) in SE-NW direction, 1.9 kilometres (1.2 mi) wide and rising to 1,292 metres (4,239 ft) high in the north foothills of Forbidden Plateau. Situated 5.55 kilometres (3.45 mi) east of Bacho Kiro Peak, 5.34 kilometres (3.32 mi) south-southwest of Pishtachev Peak. Surmounts Rozier Glacier to the northeast, Montgolfier Glacier to the southwest, and Wilhelmina Bay and its southwesterly part Piccard Cove to the northwest where the ridge ends in Sophie Cliff. Named after the Thracian god Balis.

=== Montgolfier Glacier ===
64°47′S 62°15′W. Glacier flowing to Piccard Cove between Rozier and Woodbury Glaciers on the west coast of Graham Land. Mapped by the Falkland Islands Dependencies Survey (FIDS) from photos taken by Hunting Aerosurveys Ltd. in 1956-57. Named by the UK-APC in 1960 for the Montgolfier brothers, Joseph M. Montgolfier (1740-1810) and his brother Etienne J. Montgolfier (1745–99), French papermakers, inventors of the hot-air balloon, 1782–83, and pioneer balloonists.

=== Bacho Kiro Peak ===
64°47′02.0″S 62°15′36.0″W. A rocky, partly ice-free peak rising to 1,419 metres (4,656 ft) high between Woodbury Glacier and Montgolfier Glacier. Situated 4.35 kilometres (2.70 mi) east of The Downfall, 5.55 kilometres (3.45 mi) south-southwest of Sophie Cliff, and 2.9 kilometres (1.8 mi) north of Mechit Buttress. Named after the Bulgarian enlightener and revolutionary Bacho Kiro (Kiro Zanev, 1835-1876).

=== Mechit Buttress ===
64°48′34.0″S 62°15′52.0″W. An ice-covered buttress rising to 1,891 metres (6,204 ft) high between Moser Glacier, Woodbury Glacier and Montgolfier Glacier, linked by a saddle to Forbidden Plateau to the southeast. Situated 4.65 kilometres (2.89 mi) southeast of The Downfall, and 2.9 kilometres (1.8 mi) south of Bacho Kiro Peak. Named after Mechit Peak in Rila Mountain, Bulgaria.

=== Woodbury Glacier ===
64°47′S 62°20′W. Glacier just west of Montgolfier Glacier, flowing into Piccard Cove. Mapped by the FIDS from air photos taken by Hunting Aerosurveys Ltd. in 1956-57. Named by the UK-APC in 1960 for Walter B. Woodbury (1834–85), English pioneer of photomechanical printing in 1865 and of serial film cameras for use in balloons and kites in 1877.

=== O'Neal Point ===
64°42′00″S 62°18′00″W. A point on the east side of Arctowski Peninsula. The point stands between the entrances of Beaupré Cove and Piccard Cove in Wilhelmina Bay. Named after James D. O'Neal, cartographer, Special Maps Branch, United States Geological Survey, who was United States Observer with the Chilean Antarctic Expedition, October 1956-April 1957, working in the South Shetland Islands and northwestern Antarctic Peninsula.

== Sources ==
- Alberts, Fred G., ed. (1995), Geographic Names of the Antarctic (PDF) (2 ed.), United States Board on Geographic Names This article incorporates public domain material from websites or documents of the United States Board on Geographic Names.

REMA Explorer
The Reference Elevation Model of Antarctica (REMA) gives ice surface measurements of most of the continent. When a feature is ice-covered, the ice surface will differ from the underlying rock surface and will change over time. To see ice surface contours and elevation of a feature as of the last REMA update,
- Open the Antarctic REMA Explorer
- Enter the feature's coordinates in the box at the top left that says "Find address or place", then press enter
  The coordinates should be in DMS format, e.g. 65°05'03"S 64°01'02"W. If you only have degrees and minutes, you may not be able to locate the feature.
- Hover over the icons at the left of the screen
- Find "Hillshade" and click on that
  In the bottom right of the screen, set "Shading Factor" to 0 to get a clearer image
- Find "Contour" and click on that
  In the "Contour properties" box, select Contour Interval = 1m
  You can zoom in and out to see the ice surface contours of the feature and nearby features
- Find "Identify" and click on that
  Click the point where the contour lines seem to indicate the top of the feature
  The "Identify" box will appear to the top left. The Orthometric height is the elevation of the ice surface of the feature at this point.

- Antarctic REMA Explorer (Digital Elevation Models created by the Polar Geospatial Center from Maxar imagery), Polar Geospatial Center. University of Minnesota, 2019
- "Bacho Kiro Peak", Composite Gazetteer of Antarctica, Scientific Committee on Antarctic Research
- "Balis Ridge", Composite Gazetteer of Antarctica, Scientific Committee on Antarctic Research
- Graham Land and South Shetland Islands, BAS: British Antarctic Survey, 2005
- "Mechit Buttress", Composite Gazetteer of Antarctica, Scientific Committee on Antarctic Research
- "O'Neal Point", Composite Gazetteer of Antarctica, Scientific Committee on Antarctic Research
