= Toma Pishtachev =

Bulgarian cartographer

Toma Pishtachev (1876–1955) was a Bulgarian cartographer. Pishtachev Peak in Antarctica is named in his honor. The National Polytechnical Museum in Sofia preserves a number of his original cartographic productions, including a plan of Sofia in 1887, produced in 1907 in honor of twenty years since Ferdinand I of Bulgaria's accession to the Bulgarian throne; and a plan of old Sofia in 1879 and its regulation project in 1881.
