= Cuverville Island =

Island of Antarctica

- Cuverville Island, December 2014

- Location within Antarctica

Geography
- Location: Antarctica
- Coordinates: 64°41′S 62°38′W

Administration
- Administered under the Antarctic Treaty System

Demographics
- Population: Uninhabited

Cuverville Island or Île de Cavelier de Cuverville is a dark, rocky island lying in Errera Channel between Arctowski Peninsula and the northern part of Rongé Island, off the west coast of Graham Land in Antarctica. Cuverville Island was discovered by the Belgian Antarctic Expedition (1897–1899) under Adrien de Gerlache, who named it for Jules de Cuverville (1834–1912), a vice admiral of the French Navy.

== Important Bird Area ==
The island has been identified as an Important Bird Area (IBA) by BirdLife International because it supports a breeding colony of about 6500 pairs of gentoo penguins, the largest for this species on the Antarctic Peninsula. Other birds nesting at the site include southern giant petrels and Antarctic shags.

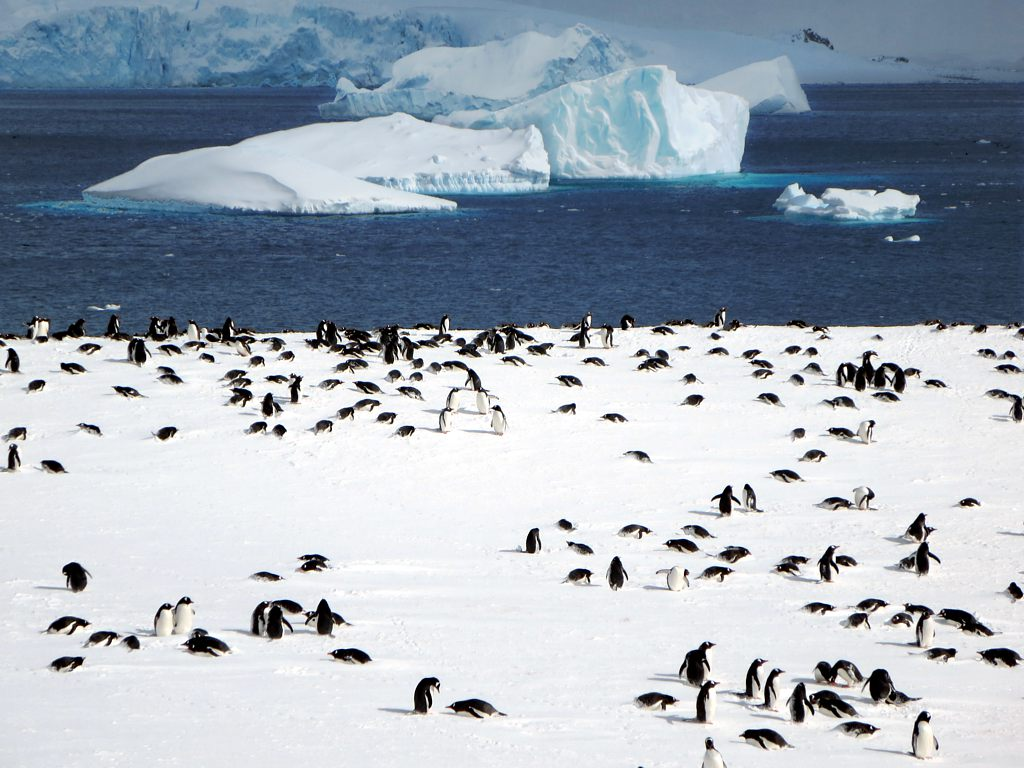

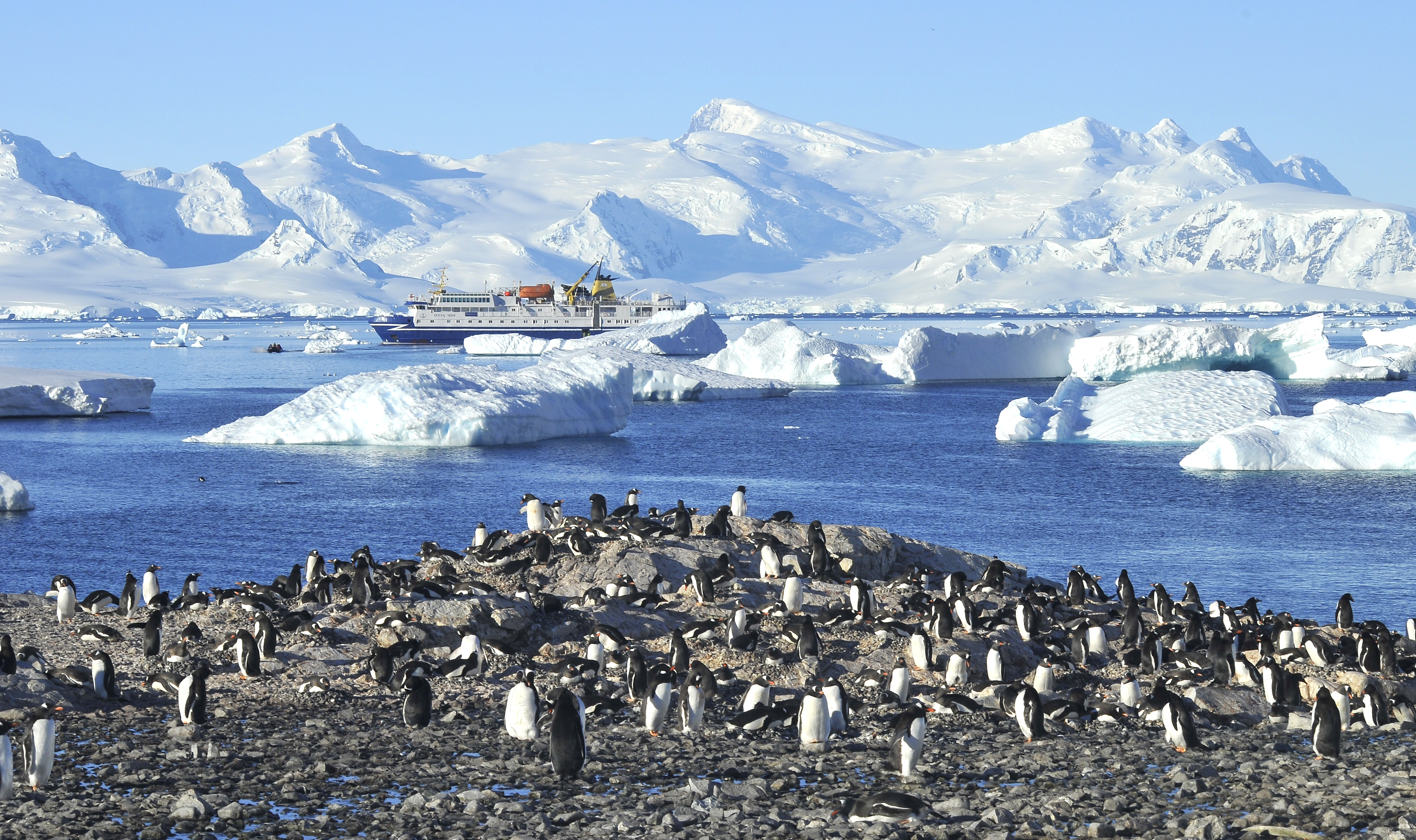

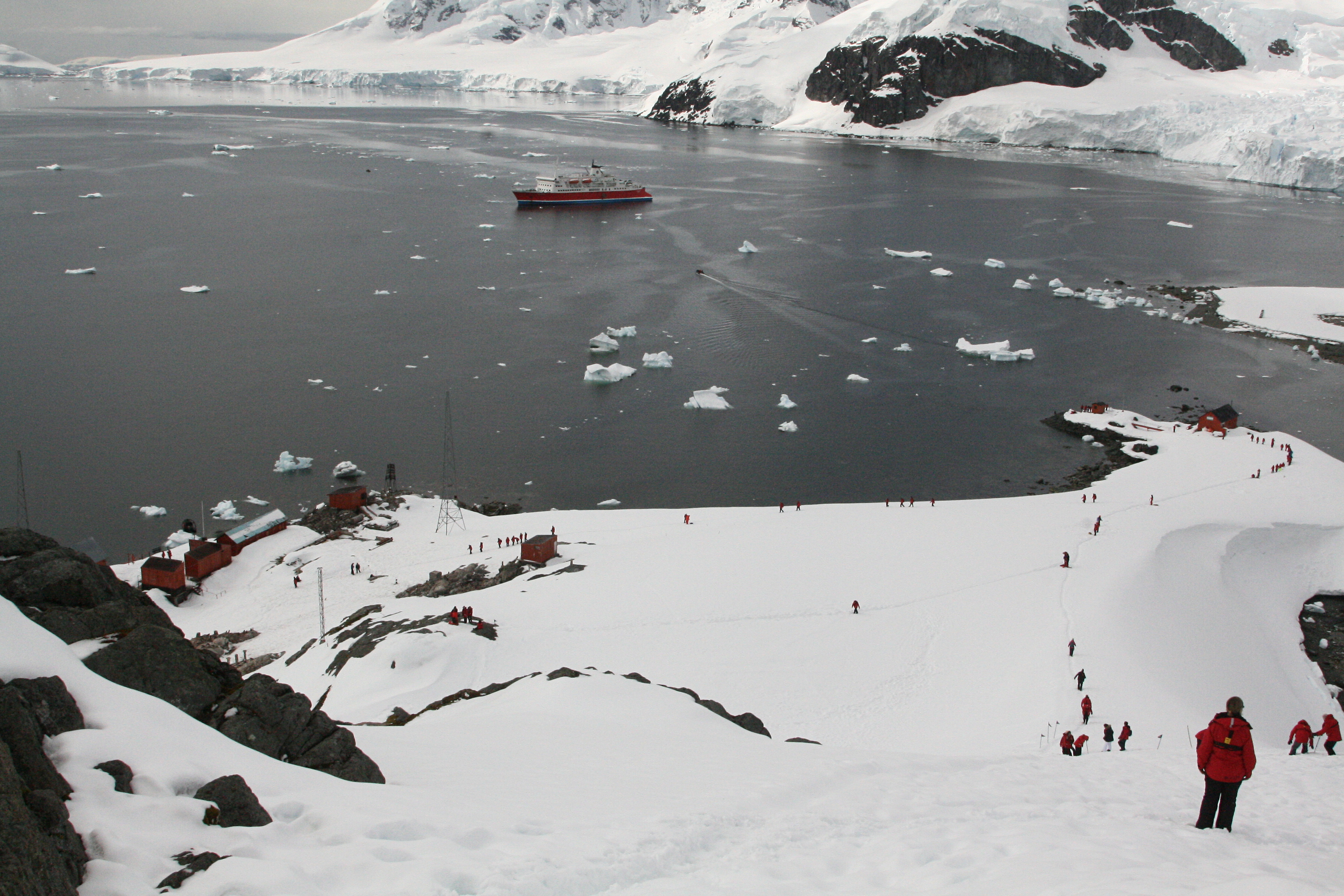

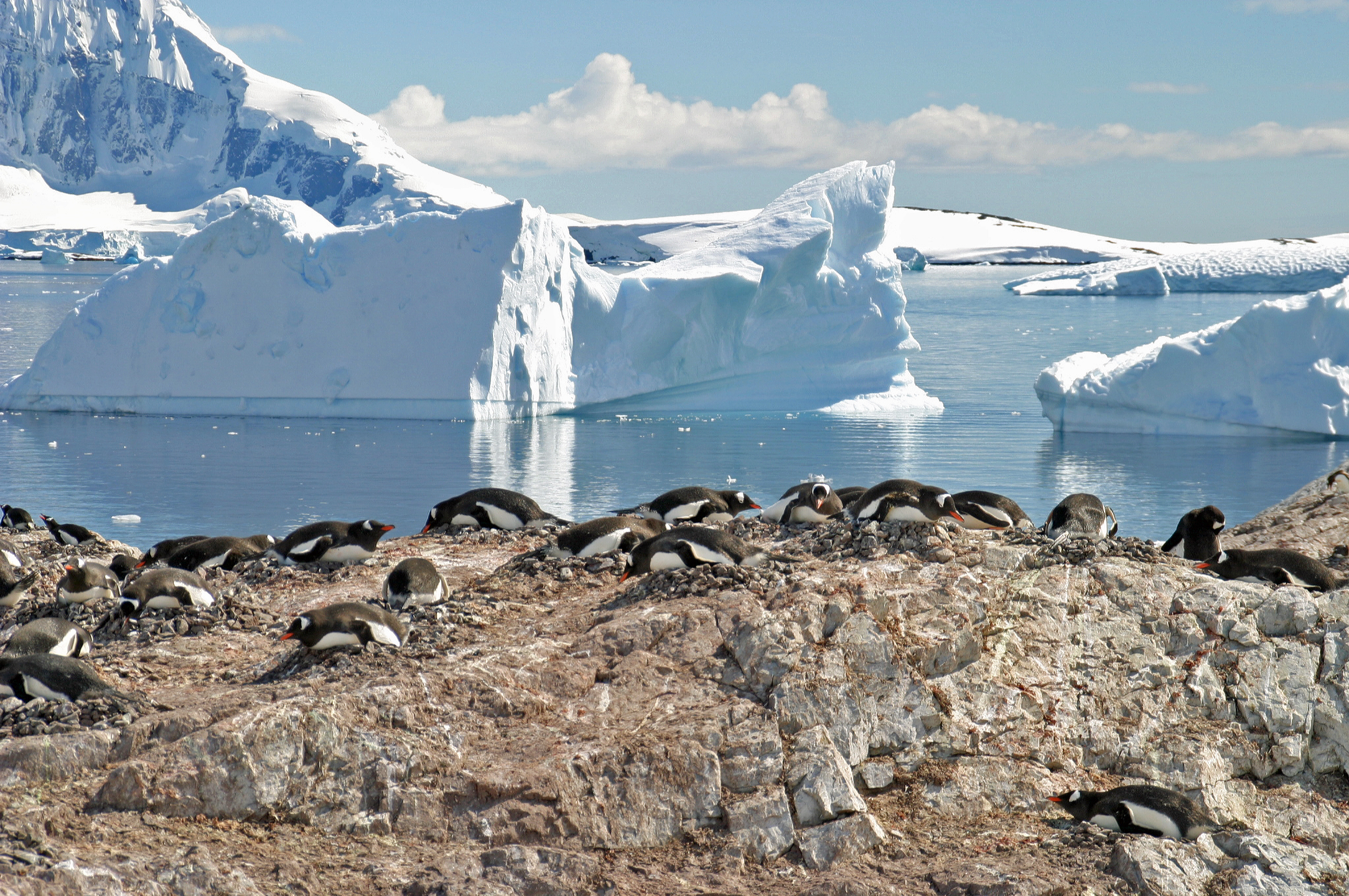

== See also ==
- List of Antarctic islands south of 60° S
