= Nansen Island =

Island in Graham Land, Antarctica

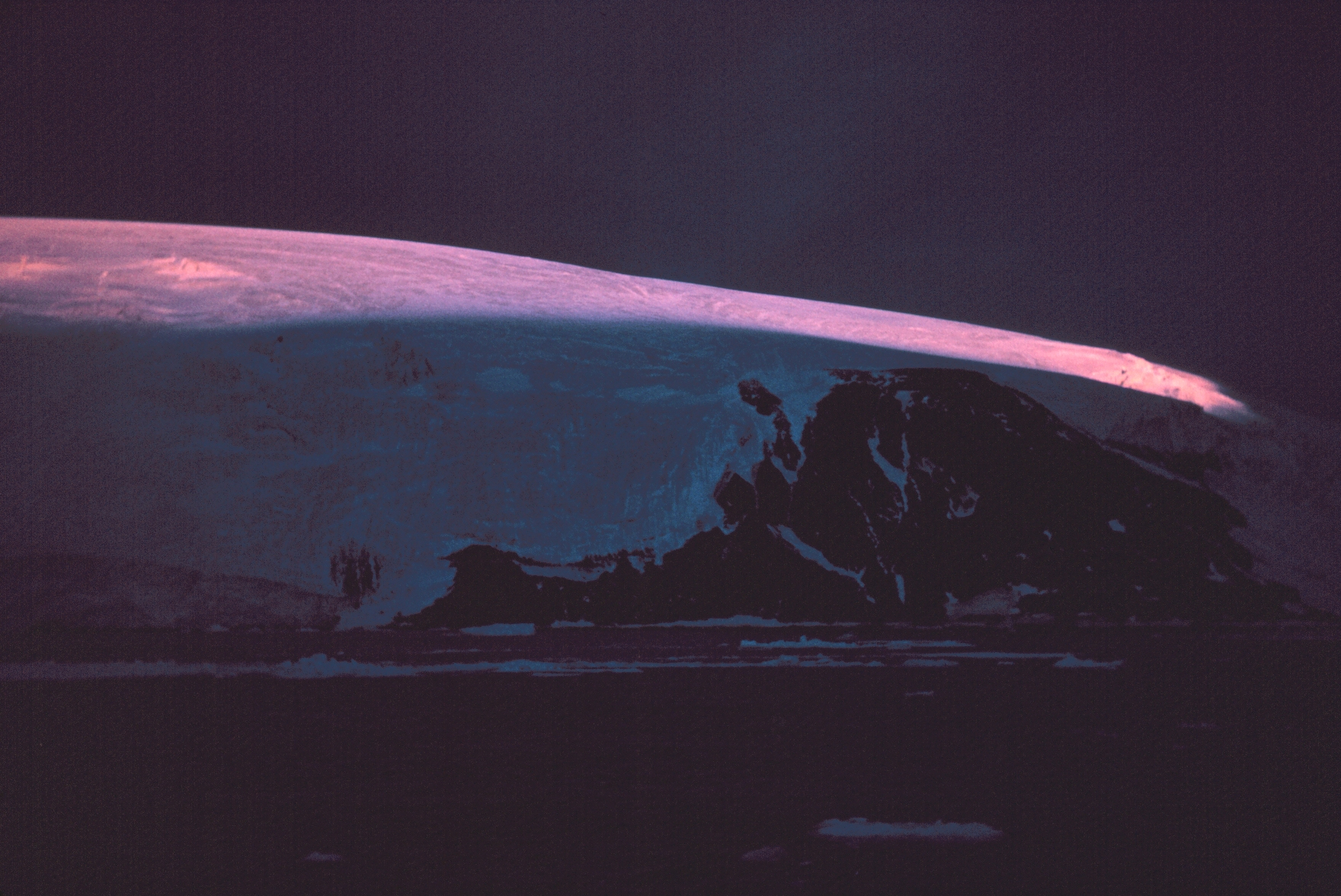
- A streak of sunlight illuminates the top of Nansen Island

- Location within Antarctica

Geography
- Location: Antarctica
- Coordinates: 64°35′S 62°06′W

Administration
- Administered under the Antarctic Treaty System

Nansen Island (64°35′S 62°06′W) is the largest of the islands lying in Wilhelmina Bay off the west coast of Graham Land, Antarctica.

== Location ==
Danco Coast, Antarctic Peninsula. Nansen Island in the center

Nansen Island is off the Danco Coast on the west side of the Antarctic Peninsula. It is in the northeast of Wilhelmina Bay, to the southeast of Gerlache Strait. Charlotte Bay is to the east. Forbidden Plateau on the mainland is to the south.

== Discovery and name ==
Nansen Island was discovered by the Belgian Antarctic Expedition (BelgAE; 1897–1899) under Adrien de Gerlache and named for Dr. Fridtjof Nansen, noted Arctic explorer.

== Features ==
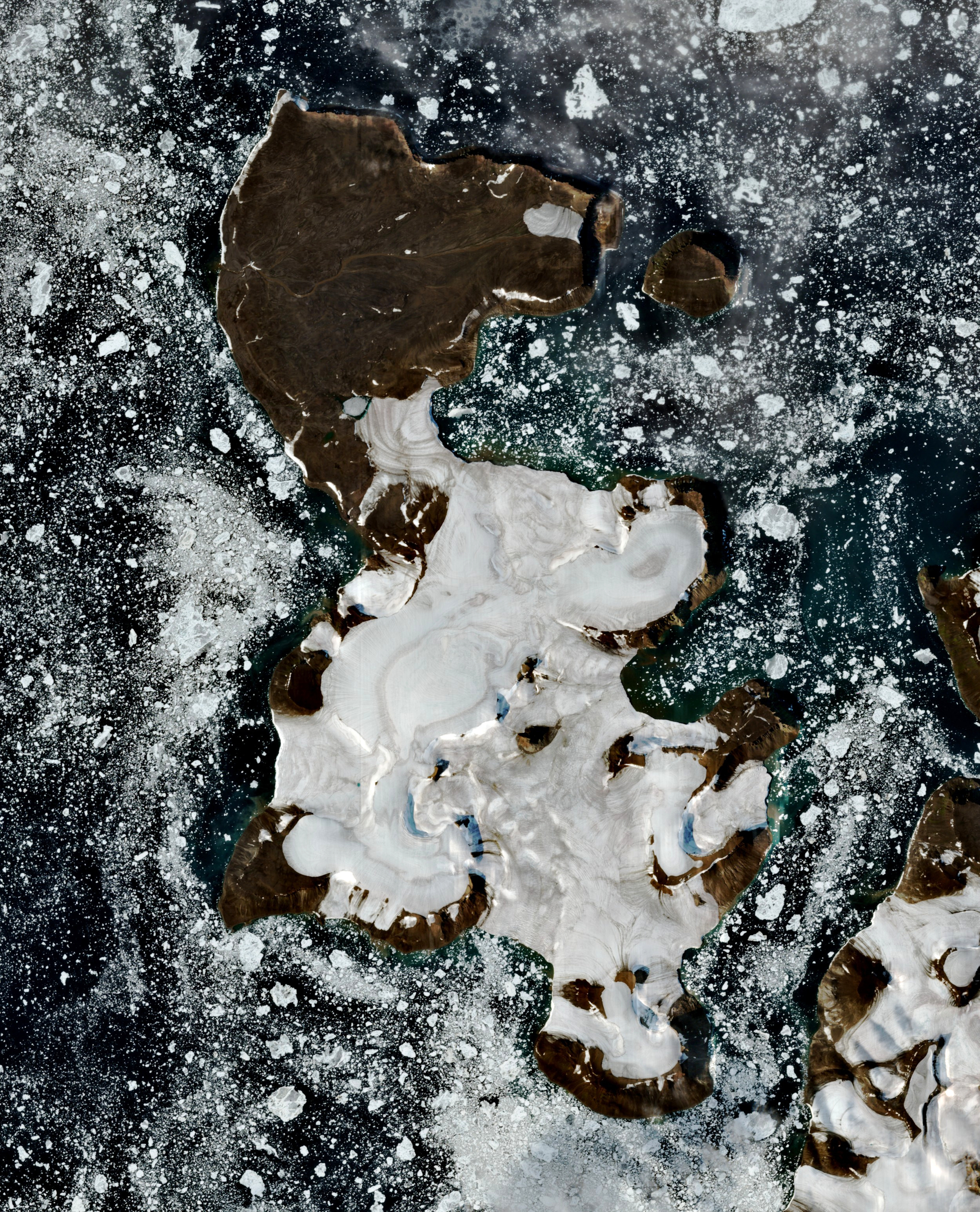
Nansen Island satellite view

Features and nearby features include:

=== Patcha Point ===
64°37′S 62°08′W. The south end of Nansen Island. Charted by the BelgAE under Gerlache, 1897-99. Named by the UK Antarctic Place-Names Committee (UK-APC) in 1960 for Jan Patcha, helicopter pilot with the Falkland Islands and Dependencies Aerial Survey Expedition (FIDASE) which photographed this area in 1956-57.

=== Bearing Island ===
64°33′S 62°02′W. A small island lying midway between Nansen and Enterprise Islands in Wilhelmina Bay. The name Bearing or Direction Island was used for this feature by whalers in the area because the island and a rock patch on Nansen Island were used as leading marks when entering Foyn Harbor from the southeast.

=== Enterprise Island ===
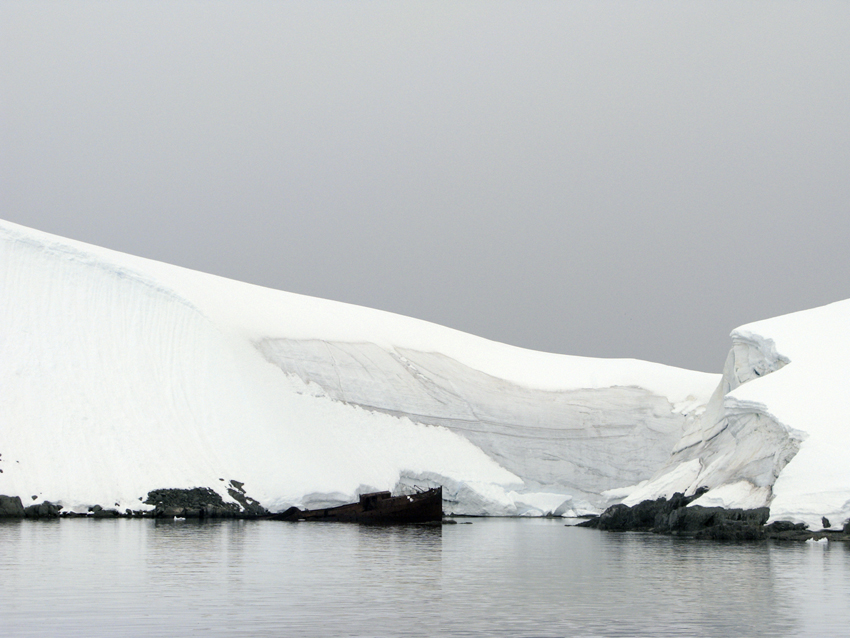
Enterprise Island

64°32′S 62°00′W. An island 1.5 nautical miles (2.8 km; 1.7 mi) long lying at the northeast end of Nansen Island in Wilhelmina Bay. This island and Nansen Island were first charted as one feature and named "Ile Nansen" by the BelgAE under Gerlache in 1898. The islands became well known to whalers operating in the area in the early 1900's and the names North and South Nansen Islands were used to distinguish them. Since Nansen Island has now become established for the larger feature, a new name has been given to the smaller by the UK-APC, commemorating the enterprise of the whalers who made the anchorage at the south side of the island (Foyn Harbor) a major center of summer industry during the period 1916-30.

=== Gouvernøren Harbor ===
64°32′S 62°00′W. A small harbor indenting the east side of Enterprise Island just west of Pythia Island in Wilhelmina Bay. The name was applied by whalers using the harbor because the whaling vessel Gouvernøren was wrecked there in 1921.. The wreck lies partly submerged at 64°32.404′S 62°59.909′W.

=== Pythia Island ===
64°32′S 61°59′W. An island 0.2 nautical miles (0.37 km; 0.23 mi) long, the largest of a group of small islands off the east side of Enterprise Island. Named by the UK-APC in 1960 after Christen Christensen's whaling factory Pythia, which operated from nearby Gouvernøren Harbor during the 1921-22 whaling season.

=== Foyn Harbor ===
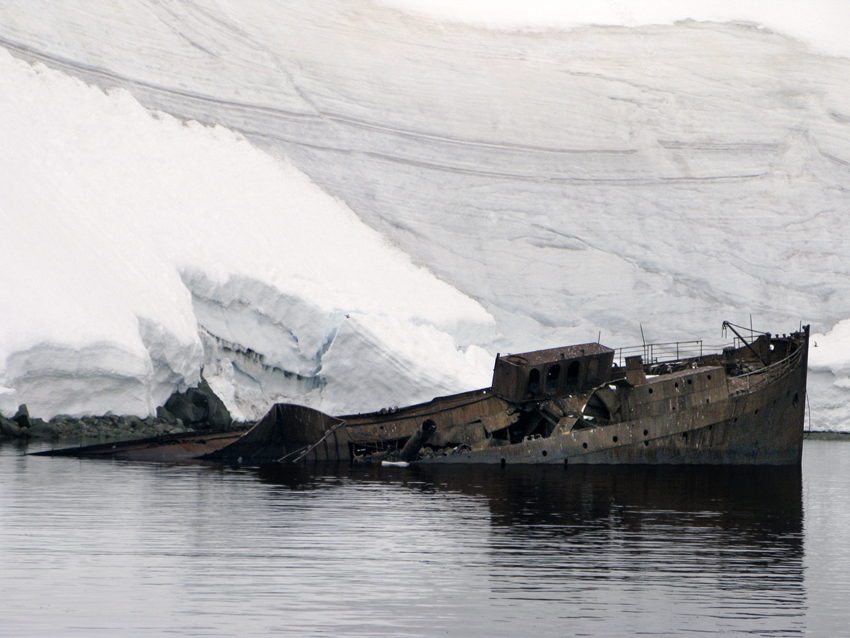
The wreck of the whaling factory ship Guvernøren in Foyn Harbor.

64°33′S 62°01′W. An anchorage between Nansen and Enterprise Islands. Surveyed by M.C. Lester and T.W. Bagshawe in 1921-22. Named by whalers in the area after the whaling factory Svend Foyn, which was moored here during 1921-22.

=== Thor Island ===
64°33′S 62°00′W. The largest of a group of small islands lying at the east side of Foyn Harbor. The island was named South Thor Island by whalers in 1921-22 because the whaling factory Thor I was moored to it during that season (the island to the northeast was called North Thor Island). In 1960 the UK-APC limited the name Thor to the island actually used by the ship; the other island was left unnamed.

=== Solstreif Island ===
64°33′S 62°00′W. The southernmost of the small group of islands at the east side of Foyn Harbor. The feature was so named by whalers operating in the area because the Norwegian whaling vessel Solstreif was moored to it during 1921-22, and probably in other seasons also.

=== Brooklyn Island ===
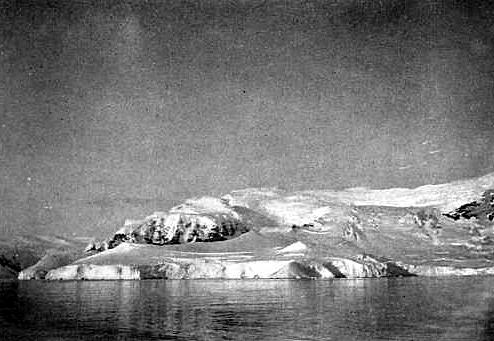
Brooklyn Island

64°39′S 62°04′W. An island 2.5 nautical miles (4.6 km; 2.9 mi) long, lying 1 nautical mile (1.9 km; 1.2 mi) south of Nansen Island in the east part of Wilhelmina Bay. Discovered by the BelgAE under Gerlache, 1897-99, and named after the home of Doctor Frederick A. Cook, American member of the expedition who served as surgeon, anthropologist, and photographer.

=== Hobbs Point ===
64°37′S 62°03′W. The northeast end of Brooklyn Island. Charted by the BelgAE under Gerlache, 1897-99. Named by the UK-APC in 1960 for Graham J. Hobbs, Falkland Islands Dependencies Survey (FIDS) geologist at the Danco Island Station O in 1957 and 1958 who made a geologic reconnaissance survey of the coast between Cape Murray and Cape Willems.

=== Wyck Island ===
64°39′S 62°05′W. A small island lying close to the west side of Brooklyn Island in the east portion of Wilhelmina Bay. Discovered by the BelgAE, 1897-99, under Gerlache, and named on the recommendation of Doctor Frederick A. Cook, surgeon of the expedition in honor of R.A. Van Wyck, first mayor of Greater New York City.

=== Fleurus Island ===
64°34′S 62°13′W. An island lying 0.5 nautical miles (0.93 km; 0.58 mi) south of Delaite Island. Shown on an Argentine government chart of 1950. Named by the UK-APC in 1956 after the British ship Fleurus, which visited the area in 1928.

=== Delaite Island ===
64°33′S 62°12′W. An island 1 nautical mile (1.9 km; 1.2 mi) long, lying 3 nautical miles (5.6 km; 3.5 mi) northeast of Emma Island in the north-central portion of Wilhelmina Bay. Discovered by the BelgAE, 1897-99, under Gerlache, and named by him for J. Delaite, a supporter of the expedition.

=== Racovitza Islands ===
64°31′S 62°05′W. A group of three islands lying just north of Nansen Island. Surveyed by the FIDS from the Norsel in 1955. Named by the UK-APC for Emile G. Racovitza, zoologist and botanist of the BelgAE which explored this area in 1897-99.

== Sources ==
- Alberts, Fred G., ed. (1995), Geographic Names of the Antarctic (PDF) (2 ed.), United States Board on Geographic Names This article incorporates public domain material from websites or documents of the United States Board on Geographic Names.
- Graham Land and South Shetland Islands, BAS: British Antarctic Survey, 2005
