= Rongé Island =

Island in Antarctica

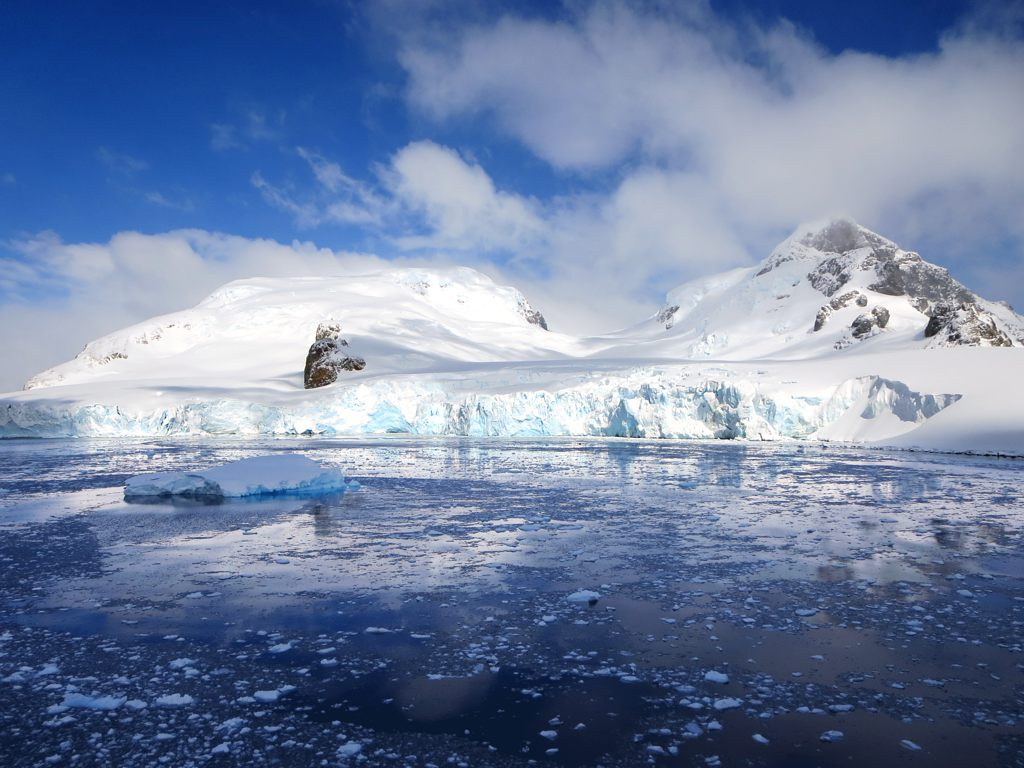
- Ronge Island facing the Antarctic Peninsula is almost ringed by glaciers.

- Location within Antarctica

Geography
- Location: Antarctica
- Coordinates: 64°43′S 62°41′W
- Highest elevation: 1,158 m (3799 ft)
- Highest point: Mount Britannia

Administration
- Administered under the Antarctic Treaty System

Rongé Island is a high, rugged island 5 nautical miles (9.3 km; 5.8 mi) long, the largest island of the group which forms the west side of Errera Channel, off the west coast of Graham Land in Antarctica.

== Location ==
Danco Coast, Antarctic Peninsula. Rongé Island to the west

Rongé Island is off the Danco Coast on the west side of the Antarctic Peninsula. It is on the southeast side of the Gerlache Strait, opposite the Osterrieth Range of Anvers Island. The Arctowski Peninsula is to its east, and Laussedat Heights to its south. Lemaire Island and the mouth of Andvord Bay are to the southwest. Rongé Island is separated from the mainland by the Errera Channel. Features of the island include Ketley Point, Mount Britannia, Mount Tennant and Georges Point. Nearby features include, clockwise from the north, Orne Islands, Cuverville Island, Brewster Island, Danco Island and Useful Island.

Exposed rocks include Cretaceous volcanics (Antarctic Peninsula Volcanic Group ) and Cretaceous plutons (Andean Intrusive Suite 1).

== Description ==
The Sailing Directions for Antarctica (1976) describes Rongé Island as follows:

Ronge Island (De Ronge Island) is about 5 miles long in a northeast-southwest direction, and half as broad. Cape Georges (Georges Point), the northern extremity, is marked by a steep pyramidal peak with steep sides. Foul ground, containing Orne Islands and above-water rocks, extends about 1 1/4 miles northward of Cape Georges. The island is high and rugged, with glacier ice lying between the rocky slopes and extending to the water´s edge. Mount Tennant, a conspicuous mountain with an elevation of about 2,257 feet, rises about 1 1/4 miles southwestward of Cape Georges. Cape Charles, the eastern extremity, is a bold bare headland with almost vertical cliffs which mark the narrows of Errera Channel, An iron framework beacon, surmounted by a cylindrical topmark painted in yellow and black stripes, stands on the western extremity of Ronge Island.

== Discovery and name ==
Rongé Island was discovered by the Belgian Antarctic Expedition (BelgAE) of 1897–1899 under Adrien de Gerlache who named it for Madame de Rongé (cousin of Johannes Ronge), a contributor to the expedition.

== Features ==
=== Sherlac Point ===
64°44′S 62°40′W. The point at the southeast end of Ronge Island. First charted and named "Cap Charles" by the BelgAE under Adrien de Gerlache, 1897-99. To avoid confusion with Charles Point in Hughes Bay, an anagram of the name was adopted by the UK Antarctic Place-Names Committee (UK-APC) in 1960.

=== Ketley Point ===
64°42′S 62°46′W. The point forming the west end of Rongé Island, off the west coast of Graham Land. Charted by the BelgAE under Adrien de Gerlache (1897-99). Named by the UK-APC in 1960 for John Ketley, Falkland Islands Dependencies Survey (FIDS) assistant surveyor at the Danco Island Station O in 1956 and at Arthur Harbour in 1957.

=== Chair Peak ===
64°43′S 62°43′W. A peak rising west of Mount Britannia on Rongé Island. This descriptive name was given by M.C. Lester and T. W. Bagshawe, who wintered at nearby Waterboat Point in 1921–22 and used this peak as a prominent landmark during their survey.

=== Mount Britannia ===
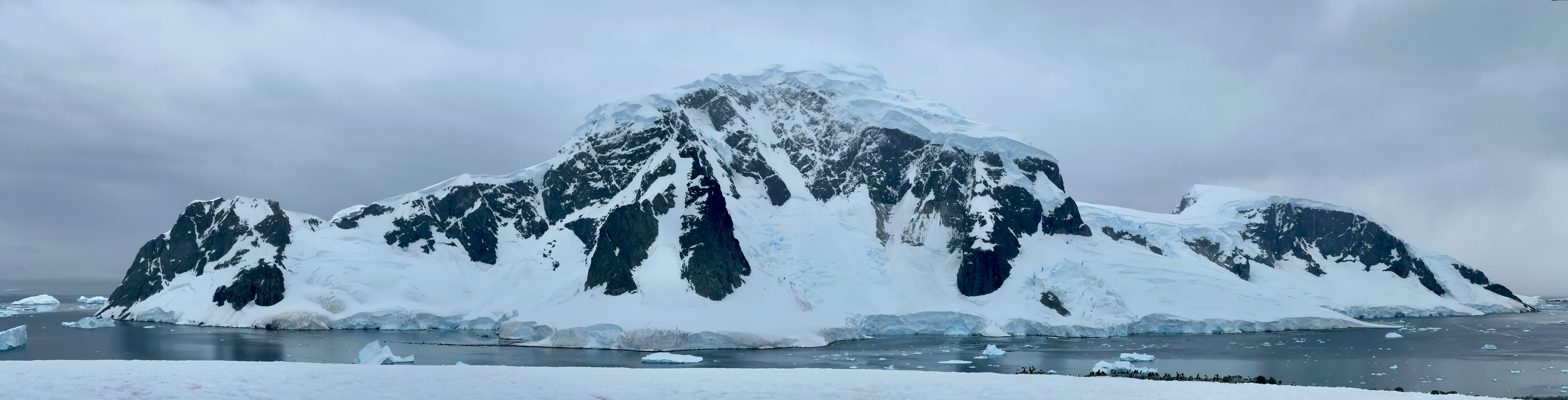
Rongé Island with Mount Britannia in the center

64°43′S 62°41′W. A mountain, 1,160 metres (3,810 ft) high, rising in the center of Rongé Island. First charted by the BelgAE under Adrien de Gerlache (1897–99). Named by the UK-APC in 1960 after H.M. Yacht Britannia in which Prince Philip, Duke of Edinburgh, visited South Georgia, the South Shetland Islands and Graham Land in January 1957.

=== Mount Tennant ===
64°41′S 62°41′W. A conspicuous peak, 690 metres (2,260 ft) high, situated at the north end of Rongé Island. Discovered by the BelgAE under Adrien de Gerlache, who charted Rongé Island in 1898. Named by members of HMS Snipe, following an Antarctic cruise in January 1948, for Vice Admiral Sir William Tennant, then Commander-in-Chief of the America and West Indies Station.

=== Pauls Hole ===
64°41′S 62°38′W. A small harbor lying along the east side of Rongé Island just south of Cuverville Island. The name was probably given by whalers operating in the area prior to 1921-22.

=== Kerr Point ===
64°42′S 62°38′W. A point 2 nautical miles (3.7 km; 2.3 mi) southeast of Georges Point, on the east side of Rongé Island. Charted by the BelgAE under Adrien de Gerlache, 1897-99. Named by the UK-APC in 1960 for Adam J. Kerr, Second Officer of RRS Shackleton, who sounded the adjacent Errera Channel in 1956-57.

=== Georges Point ===
64°40′S 62°40′W. The north tip of Rongé Island, lying west of Arctowski Peninsula. Discovered and named by the BelgAE, 1897-99, under Adrien de Gerlache.

== Nearby features ==
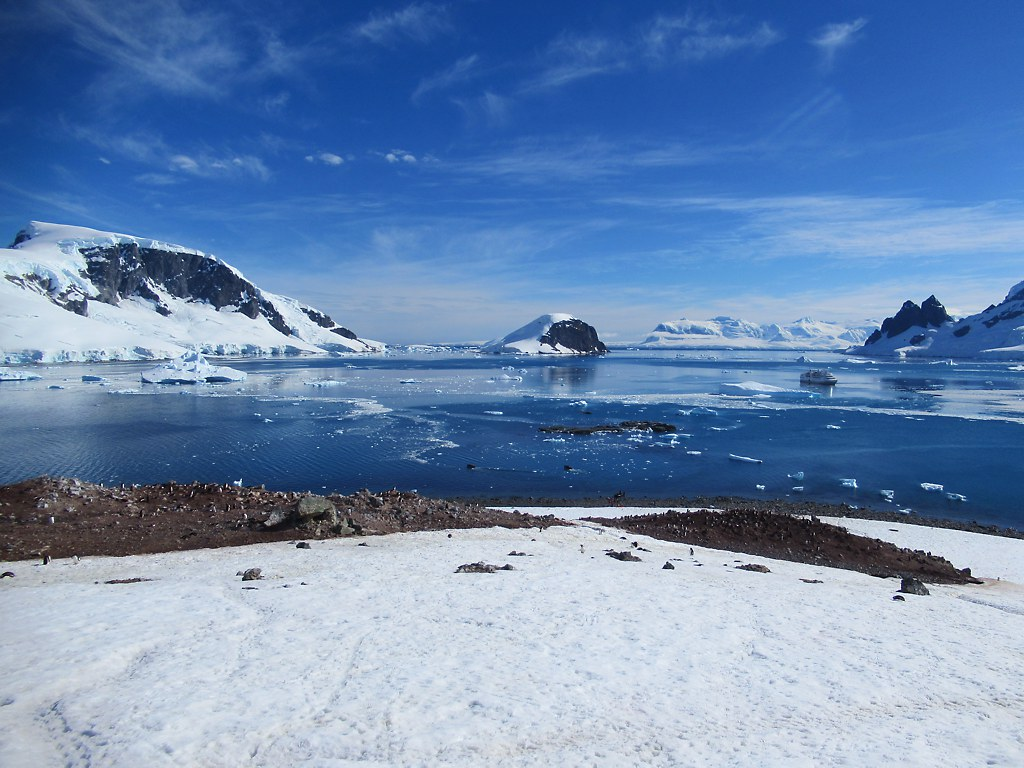
Errera Channel with Rongé Island on the left, Cuverville Island in the center and the Arctowski Peninsula on the right.

=== Orne Islands ===
64°40′S 62°40′W. A group of small islands lying close north of Rongé Island. First roughly surveyed in 1898 by the BelgAE under Adrien de Gerlache. The name Orne Islands was probably in use by Norwegian whalers, because it was used by Scottish geologist David Ferguson following his geological reconnaissance of this area aboard the Hanka in 1913.

=== Errera Channel ===
64°42′S 62°36′W. A channel between the west coast of Graham Land and Rongé Island. Discovered by the BelgAE, 1897-99, under Adrien de Gerlache, who named this feature for Léo Errera, professor at the University of Brussels and a member of the Belgica Commission.

=== Cuverville Island ===
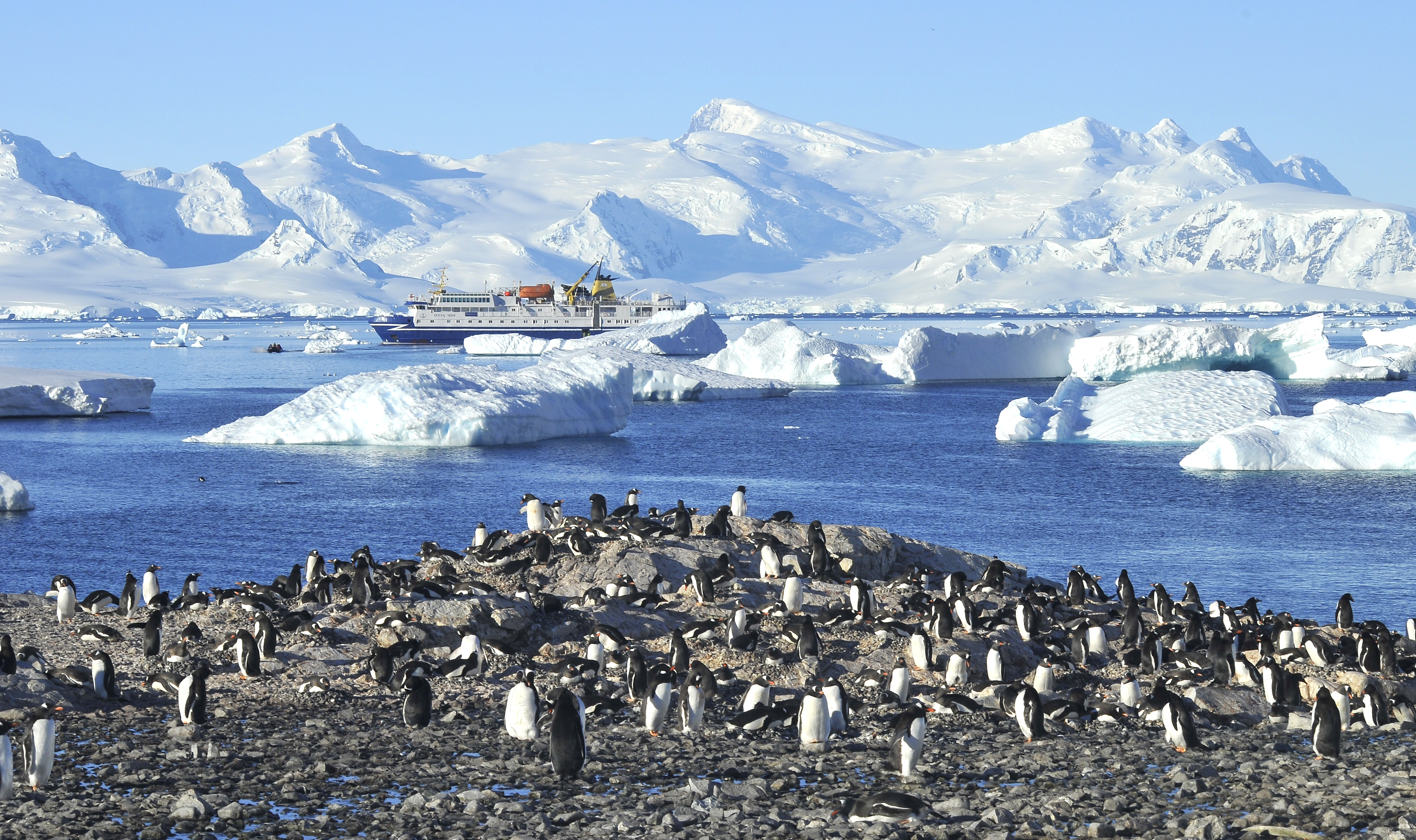
A colony of gentoo penguins. Cuverville Island

64°41′S 62°38′W. A dark, rocky island lying in Errera Channel between Arctowski Peninsula and the north part of Rongé Island. Discovered by the BelgAE under Gerlache, 1897-99, who named it for J.M.A. Cavelier de Cuverville (1834-1912), a vice admiral of the French Navy.

=== Brewster Island ===
64°43′S 62°34′W. A small island lying northeast of Danco Island in the Errera Channel. Shown on an Argentine government chart of 1950. Named by the UK-APC in 1960 for Sir David Brewster (1781-1868), Scottish natural philosopher who in 1844 improved the mirror stereoscope invented by Sir Charles Wheatstone by substituting prisms.

=== Danco Island ===
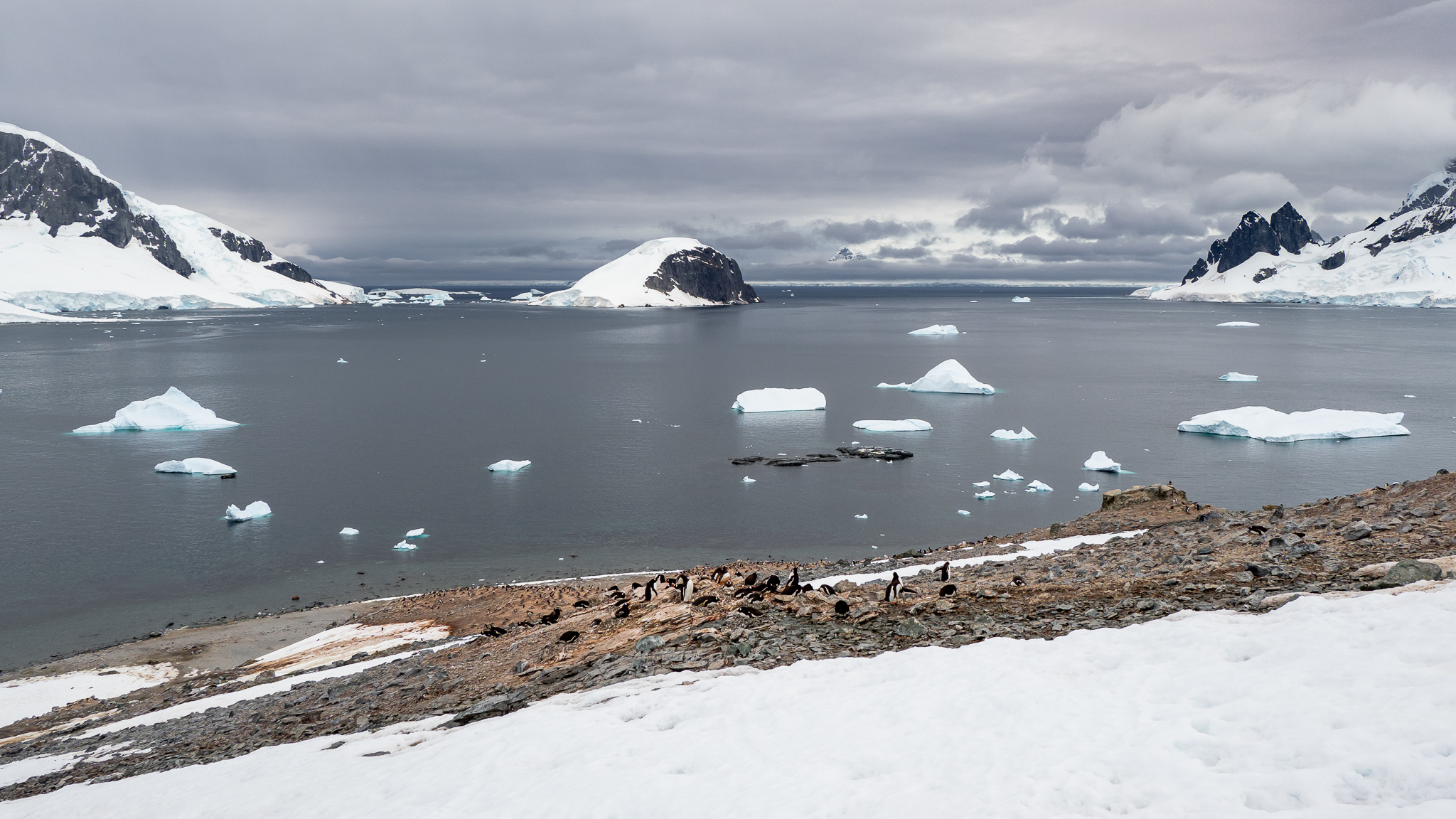
Penguins on Danco Island

64°44′S 62°37′W. An island 1 nautical mile (1.9 km; 1.2 mi) long lying in the south part of Errera Channel, off the west coast of Graham Land. Charted by the BelgAE under Gerlache, 1897-99. Surveyed by the FIDS from the Morsel in 1955, and named by the UK-APC for Émile Danco (1869-98), Belgian geophysicist and member of the BelgAE, who died on board the Belgica in the Antarctic.

=== Useful Island ===
64°43′S 62°52′W. An island 2 nautical miles (3.7 km; 2.3 mi) west of Rongé Island, with a string of rocks between, lying in Gerlache Strait. Discovered by the BelgAE, 1897-99, under Adrien de Gerlache. The name appears on a chart based upon a 1927 survey by Discovery Investigations personnel on the Discovery.

=== Ferrer Rocks ===
64°42′S 62°48′W. A group of rocks in Gerlache Strait lying between Ketley Point, Rongé Island, and Useful Island. Charted by the Chilean Antarctic Expedition (1950-51) and named for Lieutenant Fernando Ferrer Fougá hydrographic officer on the Angamos.

== Sources ==
- Alberts, Fred G., ed. (1995), Geographic Names of the Antarctic (PDF) (2 ed.), United States Board on Geographic Names This article incorporates public domain material from websites or documents of the United States Board on Geographic Names.
- Birkenmajer, Krzystof (1995), "Geology of Gerlache Strait, West Antarctica. I. Arctowski Peninsula" (PDF), Polish Polar Research, 16 (1–2): 47–60
- Graham Land and South Shetland Islands, BAS: British Antarctic Survey, 2005
- Sailing Directions for Antarctica: Includes Islands South of Latitude 60.̊, United States. Defense Mapping Agency. Hydrographic Center, 1976
