= Stereoautograph =

Optical device

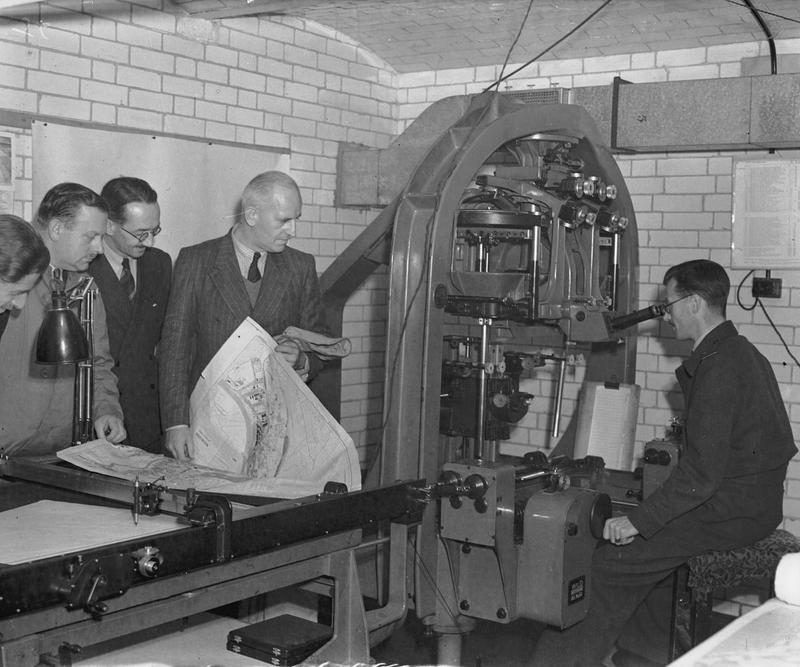
Stereoautograph Wild A5

The stereoautograph is a complex opto-mechanical measurement instrument for the evaluation of analog or digital photograms. It is based on the stereoscopy effect by using two aero photos or two photograms of the topography or of buildings from different standpoints.

It was invented by Eduard von Orel in 1907.

The photograms or photographic plates are oriented by measured passpoints in the field or on the building. This procedure can be carried out digitally (by methods of triangulation and projective geometry or iteratively (repeated angle corrections by congruent rays). The accuracy of modern autographs is about 0.001 mm.

Well known are the instruments of the companies Wild Heerbrugg (Leica), e.g. analog A7, B8 of the 1980s and the digital autographs beginning in the 1990s, or special instruments of Zeiss and Contraves.
