= Wilhelmina Bay =

Bay in Graham Land, Antarctica

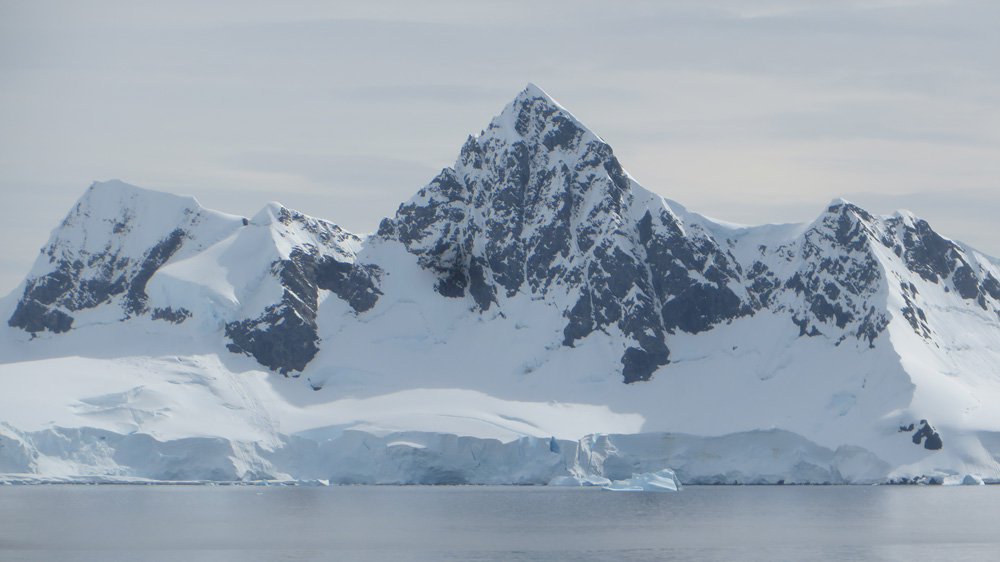
- Peak overlooking Wilhelmina Bay

- Location within Antarctica
- Coordinates: 64°38′S 62°10′W

Wilhelmina Bay (64°38′S 62°10′W) is a bay 15 nmi (28 km; 17 mi) wide between the Reclus Peninsula and Cape Anna along the west coast of Graham Land on the Antarctic Peninsula.

== Location ==
Danco Coast, Antarctic Peninsula. Wilhelmina Bay in center

Wilhelmina Bay is on the Danco Coast on the west side of the Antarctic Peninsula. It indents the southeast side of Gerlache Strait opposite the Solvay Mountains of Brabant Island. The Arctowski Peninsula defines its southwest side, Forbidden Plateau its southeast side and Nansen Island is in the northeast of the bay. Wilhelmina Bay is between Charlotte Bay to the northeast and Andvord Bay to the southwest.

Coastal features include, clockwise from the eastern entrance,

- The Reclus Peninsula, including Jacques Peaks, Bancroft Bay, Cañón Point, Zapato Point, and Café Point.
- Leonardo Glacier, Sadler Point, Blanchard Glacier, Garnerin Point, Pishtachev Peak and Rozier Glacier.
- Piccard Cove, including Sophie Cliff, Balis Ridge, Montgolfier Glacier, Bacho Kiro Peak, Mechit Buttress, Woodbury Glacier and O'Neal Point,
- The Arctowski Peninsula including Beaupré Cove, Jones Point, Hugershoff Cove and Cape Anna.

== Humpback whales ==
A study undertaken in May 2009 found a super-aggregation of krill in Wilhelmina Bay, with a large number of humpback whales feeding on them. The researchers counted a density of 5.1 whales per square kilometer. Smaller and less dense aggregations of krill and whales were also found in Andvord Bay to the south. The krill and the whales are abundant in late autumn along the western Antarctic Peninsula, particularly in Wilhelmina Bay, where the whales seem to be eating as much as possible in preparation for the winter.

== Discovery and name ==
Wilhelmina Bay was discovered by the Belgian Antarctic Expedition (BelgAE) of 1897–99 led by Adrien de Gerlache. The bay is named for Wilhelmina, Queen of the Netherlands, who reigned from 1890 to 1948.

== Eastern features ==
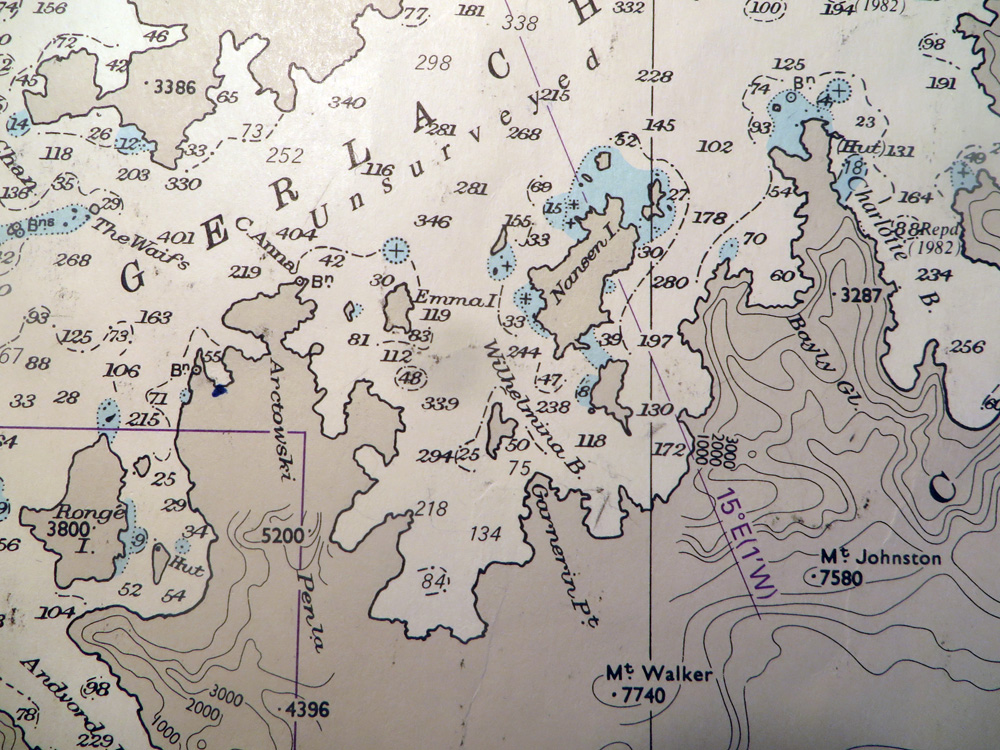
Wilhelmina Bay

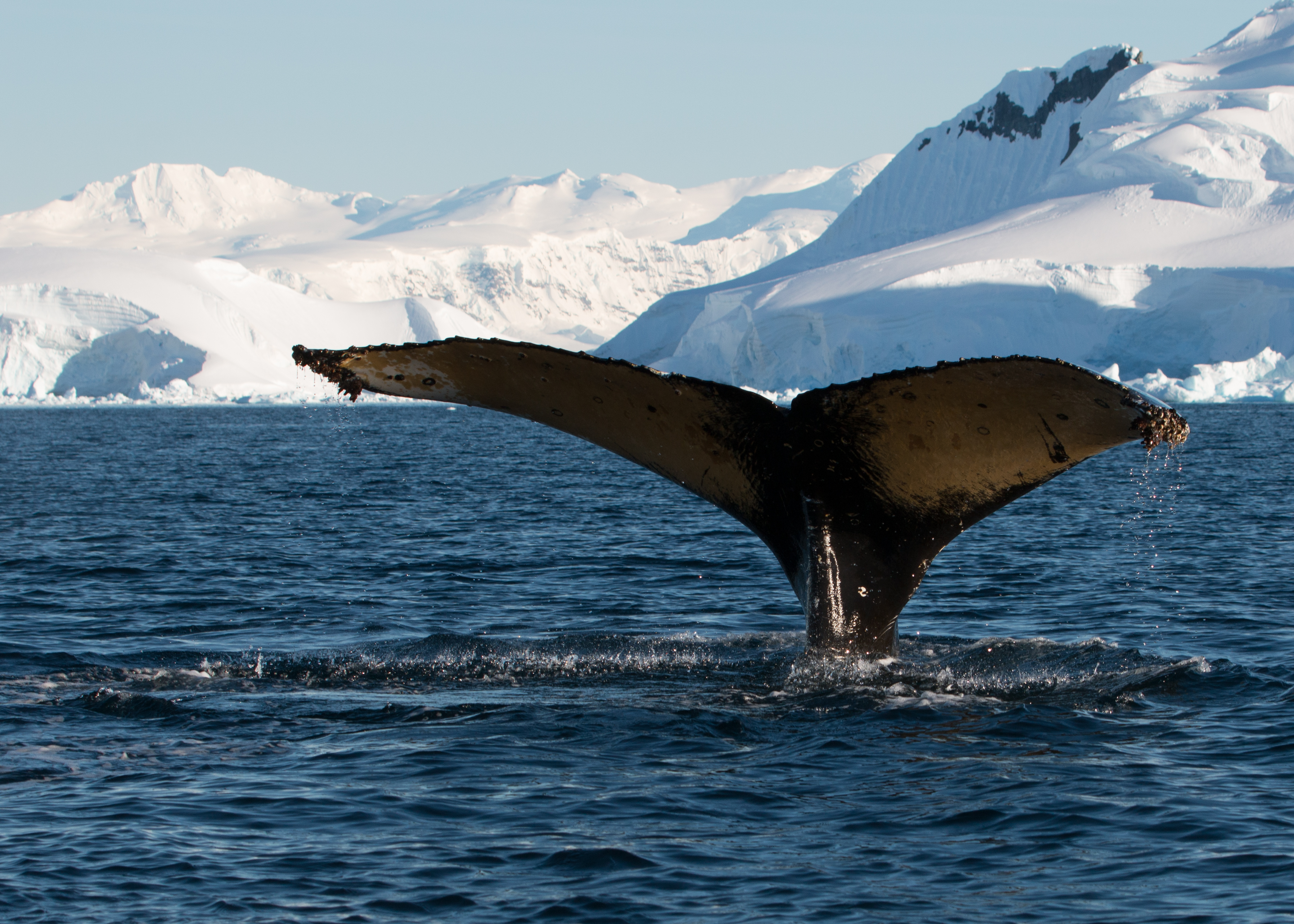
Humpback Whale in Wilhelmina Bay February 2019

=== Leonardo Glacier ===
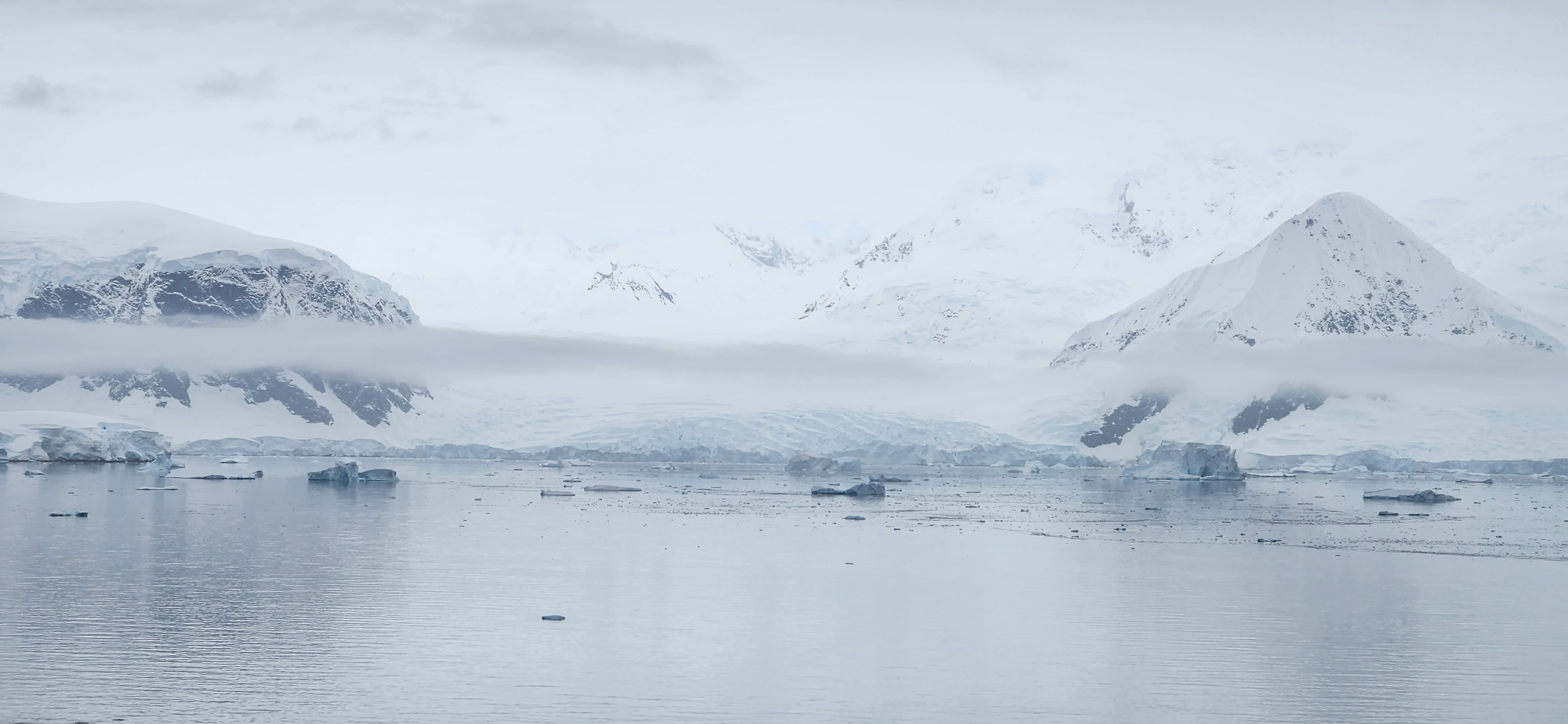
Leonardo Glacier

64°42′S 61°58′W. A glacier flowing into Wilhelmina Bay between Sadler Point and Café Point, on the west coast of Graham Land. Charted by the BelgAE under Gerlache, 1897-99. Named by the UK Antarctic Place-Names Committee (UK-APC) in 1960 for Leonardo da Vinci (1452-1519), artist, musician, architect and first aeronautical scientist.

=== Sadler Point ===
64°42′S 62°04′W. A point within Wilhelmina Bay, lying 2.5 nautical miles (4.6 km; 2.9 mi) east of Garnerin Point. Charted by the BelgAE under Gerlache, 1897-99. Named by the UK-APC in 1960 after James Sadler (1751-1828), Oxford confectioner, the first English aeronaut, who ascended in a montgolfier balloon on October 4, 1784.

=== Blanchard Glacier ===
64°44′S 62°05′W. A glacier flowing into Wilhelmina Bay between Garnerin Point and Sadler Point. First charted by the BelgAE under Gerlache, 1897-99. Named by the UK-APC in 1960 for Jean-Pierre Blanchard (1753-1809), French aeronaut, the first professional balloon pilot, who, with John J. Jeffries, made the first balloon crossing of the English Channel in 1785.

=== Garnerin Point ===
64°41′S 62°10′W. A point on the west coast of Graham Land projecting into Wilhelmina Bay southeast of Pelseneer Island. Charted by the BelgAE under Gerlache, 1897-99. Named by the UK-APC in 1960 for André-Jacques Garnerin (1770-1825), French aeronaut, the first man to make a successful descent from a free balloon by parachute, in 1797.

=== Pishtachev Peak ===
64°44′00.0″S 62°06′27.0″W A rocky, partly ice-free peak rising to 1,283 metres (4,209 ft) between Rozier Glacier and Blanchard Glacier. Situated 5.3 kilometres (3.3 mi) east of Sophie Cliff, 5.67 kilometres (3.52 mi) south-southeast of Garnerin Point, and 5.57 kilometres (3.46 mi) southwest of Sadler Point. Named after the Bulgarian cartographer Toma Pishtachev (1876-1955).

=== Rozier Glacier ===
64°45′S 62°13′W. A glacier flowing into Wilhelmina Bay north of Sophie Cliff. Charted by the BelgAE under Gerlache, 1897-99. Named by the UK-APC in 1960 for Jean-François Pilâtre de Rozier (1756-85), French technician who made the first human balloon ascent and (with the Marquis d'Arlande) the first balloon voyage, in 1783.

== Western features ==
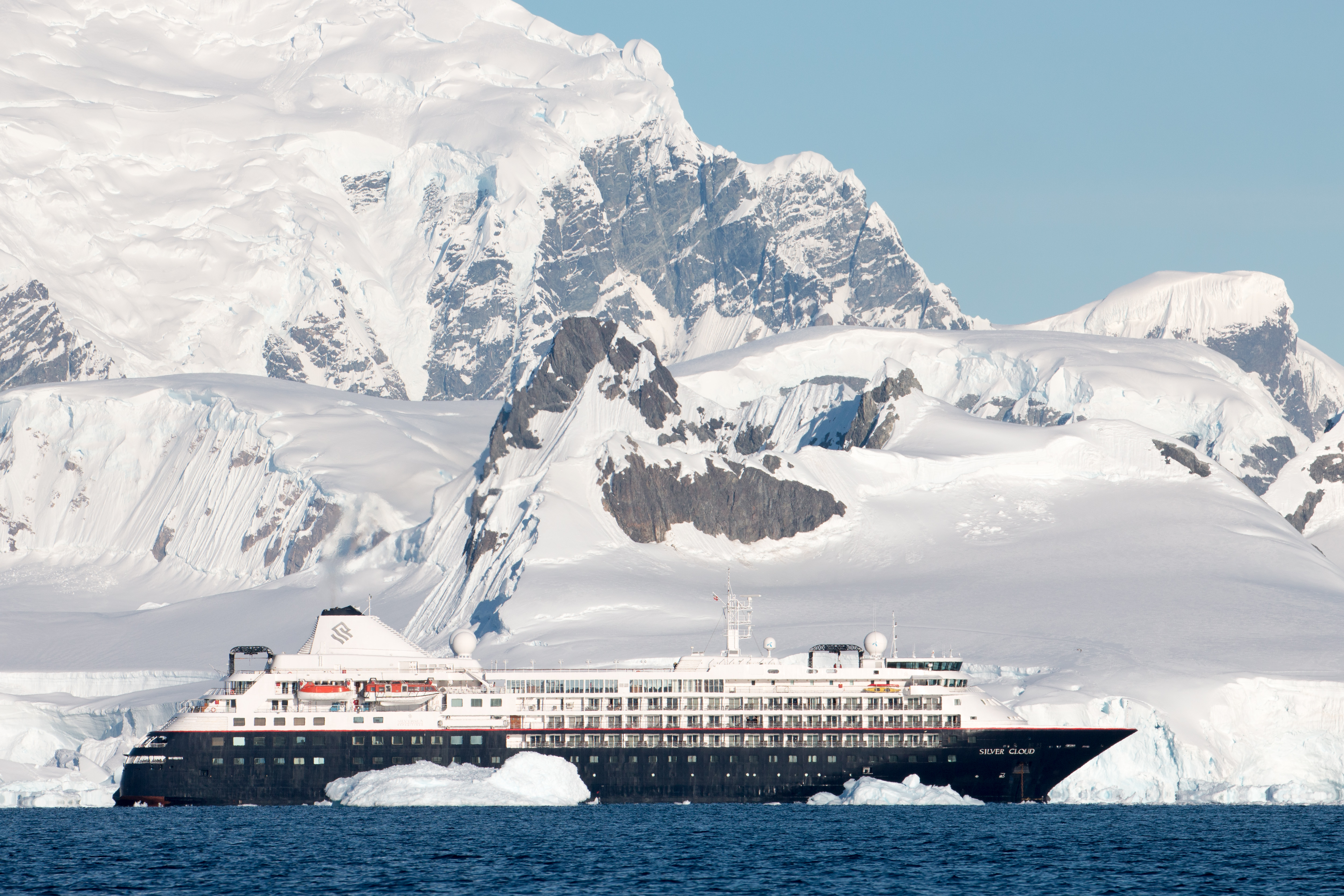
Cruise ship in Wilhelmina Bay February 2019

=== Beaupré Cove ===
64°42′S 62°22′W. A cove 1 nautical mile (1.9 km; 1.2 mi) wide lying immediately northwest of Piccard Cove in Wilhelmina Bay. First charted by the BelgAE under Gerlache, 1897-99. Named by the UK-APC in 1960 for Charles-François Beautemps-Beaupré (1766-1854), French hydrographer who, in 1825, prepared survey instructions for the officers of the Astrolabe and Zelee, laying down for the first time principles for making measurements from landscape drawings.

=== Jones Point ===
64°39′S 62°18′W. A point within Wilhelmina Bay, lying 6 nautical miles (11 km; 6.9 mi) southeast of Cape Anna. Charted by the BelgAE under Gerlache, 1897-99. Named by the UK-APC in 1960 for Sir Bennett M. Jones, F.R.S., author of Aerial Surveying by Rapid Methods, a pioneer work on the subject.

=== Hugershoff Cove ===
64°38′S 62°23′W. Cove lying 2 nautical miles (3.7 km; 2.3 mi) northwest of Beaupre Cove in Withelmina Bay, along the west coast of Graham Land. Charted by the BelgAE under Gerlache, 1897-99. Named by the UK-APC in 1960 for Carl Reinhard Hugershoff (1882-1941), German geodesist who designed the autocartograph, an instrument which first applied the principles of photogrammetry to air photos, in about 1921.

=== Cape Anna ===
64°35′S 62°26′W. A prominent black cape rising to 280 metres (920 ft) high, forming the north tip of Arctowski Peninsula on the west coast of Graham Land. Discovered by the BelgAE, 1897-99, and named after Mme. Ernest (Anna) Osterrieth, who gave financial assistance to the expedition.

== Islands ==
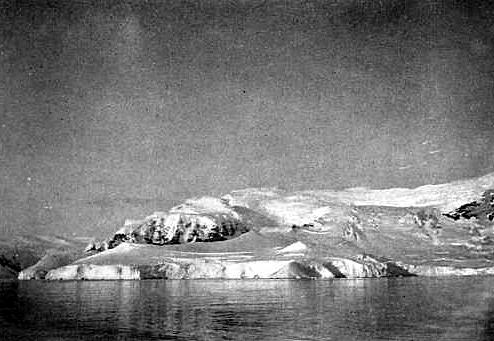
Brooklyn Island

The bay contains several islands, of which the largest is Nansen Island in the northeast of the bay. Islands around Nansen Island include Bearing Island, Enterprise Island, Pythia Island, Thor Island, Solstreif Island, Brooklyn Island, Wyck Island, Fleurus Island, Delaite Island and the Racovitza Islands. Other islands in the bay include Pelseneer Island, Emma Island and Louise Island.

=== Pelseneer Island ===
64°39′S 62°13′W. An island 2 nautical miles (3.7 km; 2.3 mi) long and 1 nautical mile (1.9 km; 1.2 mi) wide, with three prominent rocky peaks projecting through its icecap, lying 2 nautical miles (3.7 km; 2.3 mi) west of Brooklyn Island in the south-central portion of Wilhelmina Bay. Discovered by the BelgAE, 1897-99, and named by Gerlache for Paul Pelseneer, member of the Belgica Commission and writer of some of the zoological reports of the expedition.

=== Emma Island ===
64°36′S 62°20′W. An island 1.5 nautical miles (2.8 km; 1.7 mi) long, with bare jagged peaks projecting through an icecap, lying 4 nautical miles (7.4 km; 4.6 mi) west of Nansen Island in the southwest half of the entrance to Wilhelmina Bay. Discovered by the BelgAE, 1897-99, under Lieutenant Adrien de Gerlache, and named after his mother, Emma de Gerlache de Gomery.

=== Louise Island ===
64°36′S 62°23′W. Ice-covered island 0.6 nautical miles (1.1 km; 0.69 mi) long, lying 1 nautical mile (1.9 km; 1.2 mi) east of Cape Anna in the southwest side of the entrance to Wilhelmina Bay. Discovered by the BelgAE, 1897-99, under Lieutenant Adrien de Gerlache, and named by him for his sister.

== Gallery ==
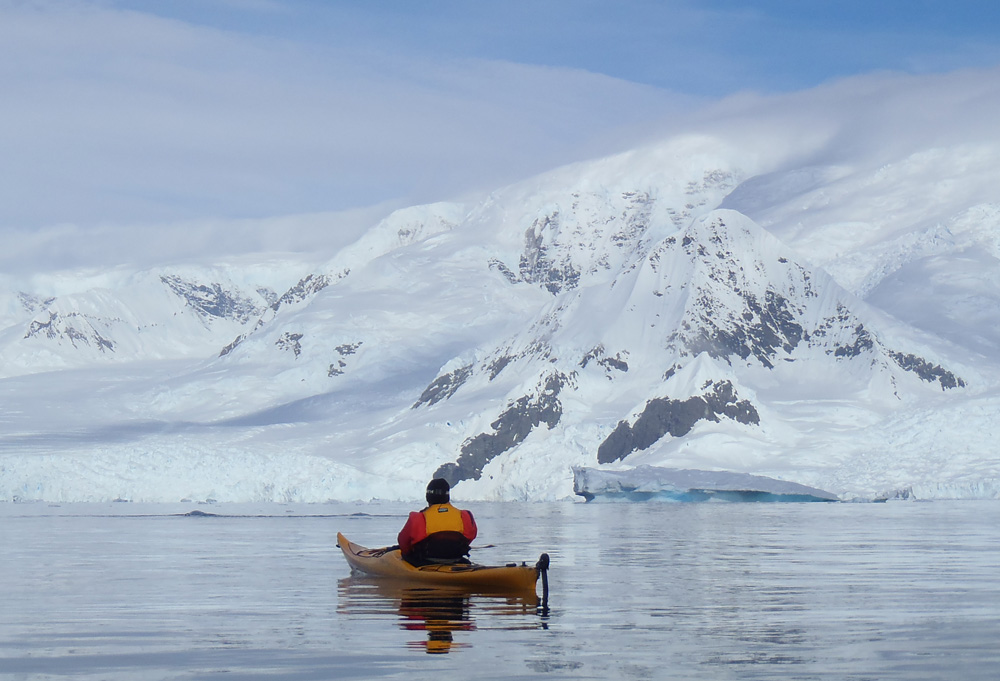
A kayaker watches whales in Wilhelmina Bay

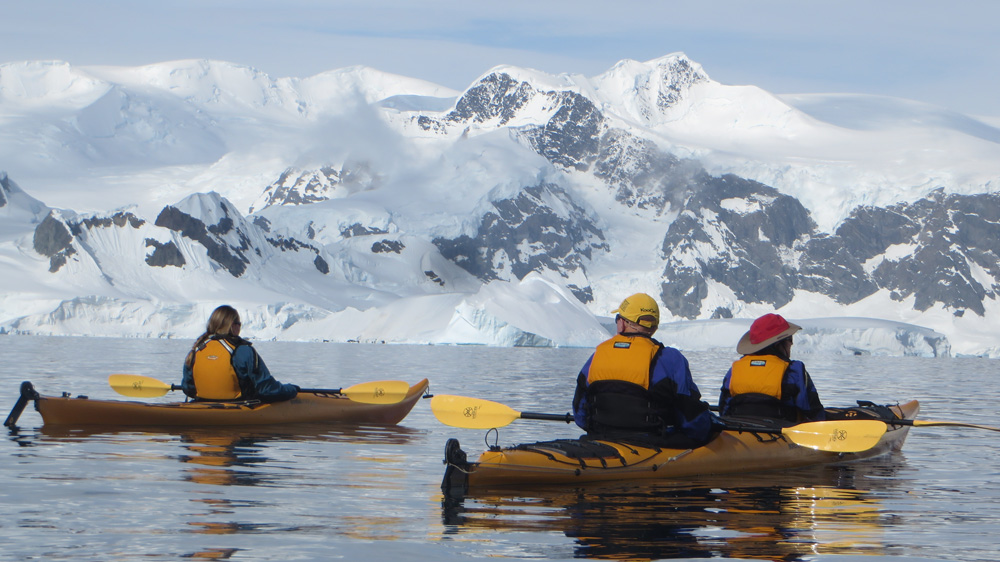
Kayakers in Wilhelmina Bay

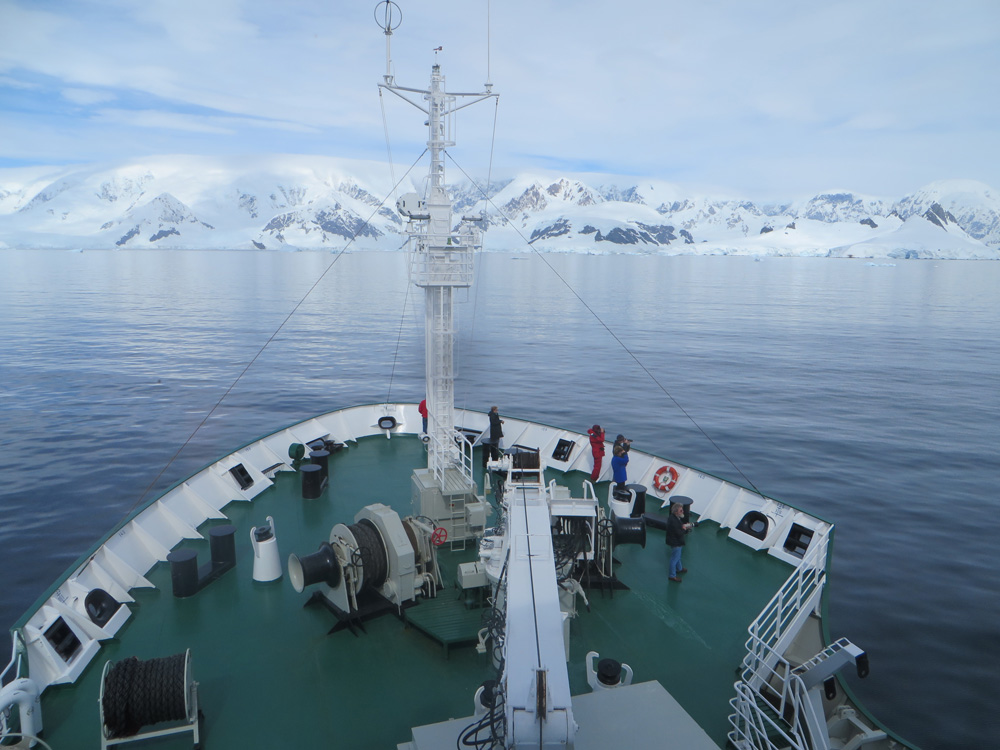
Expedition vessel Akademik Ioffe sailing into Wilhelmina Bay in January 2014

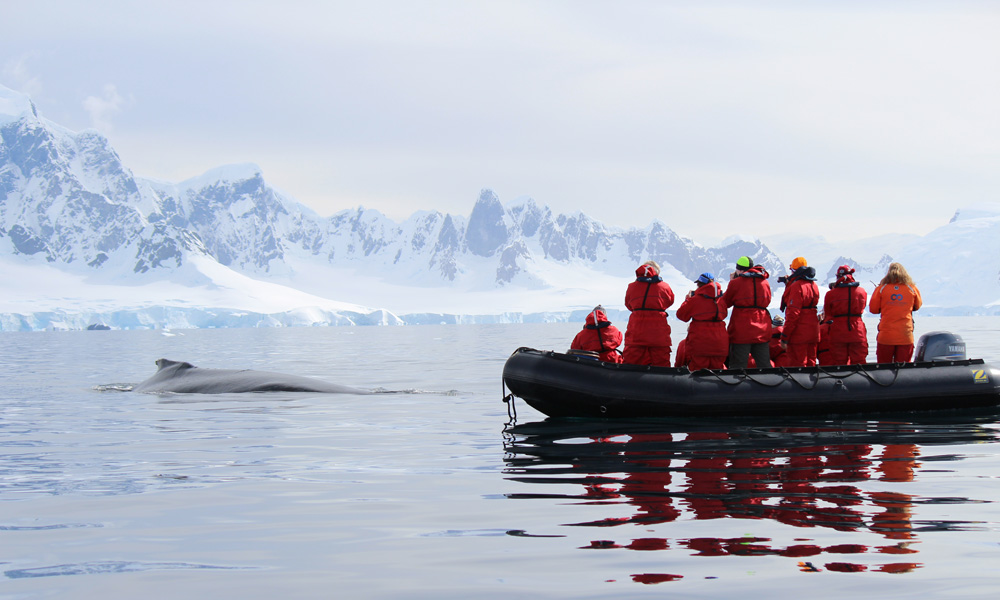
A tourist Zodiac has a close encounter with a humpback whale in Wilhelmina Bay

== Sources ==
- Alberts, Fred G., ed. (1995), Geographic Names of the Antarctic (PDF) (2 ed.), United States Board on Geographic Names This article incorporates public domain material from websites or documents of the United States Board on Geographic Names.

REMA Explorer
The Reference Elevation Model of Antarctica (REMA) gives ice surface measurements of most of the continent. When a feature is ice-covered, the ice surface will differ from the underlying rock surface and will change over time. To see ice surface contours and elevation of a feature as of the last REMA update,
- Open the Antarctic REMA Explorer
- Enter the feature's coordinates in the box at the top left that says "Find address or place", then press enter
  The coordinates should be in DMS format, e.g. 65°05'03"S 64°01'02"W. If you only have degrees and minutes, you may not be able to locate the feature.
- Hover over the icons at the left of the screen
- Find "Hillshade" and click on that
  In the bottom right of the screen, set "Shading Factor" to 0 to get a clearer image
- Find "Contour" and click on that
  In the "Contour properties" box, select Contour Interval = 1m
  You can zoom in and out to see the ice surface contours of the feature and nearby features
- Find "Identify" and click on that
  Click the point where the contour lines seem to indicate the top of the feature
  The "Identify" box will appear to the top left. The Orthometric height is the elevation of the ice surface of the feature at this point.

- Antarctic REMA Explorer (Digital Elevation Models created by the Polar Geospatial Center from Maxar imagery), Polar Geospatial Center. University of Minnesota, 2019
- Graham Land and South Shetland Islands, BAS: British Antarctic Survey, 2005
- Nowacek, Douglas P.; Friedlaender, Ari S.; Halpin, Patrick N.; Hazen, Elliott L.; Johnston, David W.; Read, Andrew J.; Espinasse, Boris; Zhou, Meng; Zhu, Yiwu (27 April 2011), "Super-Aggregations of Krill and Humpback Whales in Wilhelmina Bay, Antarctic Peninsula", PLOS ONE, 6 (4) e19173, Bibcode:2011PLoSO...619173N, doi:10.1371/journal.pone.0019173, PMC 3083408, PMID 21556153
- "Pishtachev Peak", Composite Gazetteer of Antarctica, Scientific Committee on Antarctic Research
