= Danco Island =

Island in Graham Land, Antarctica

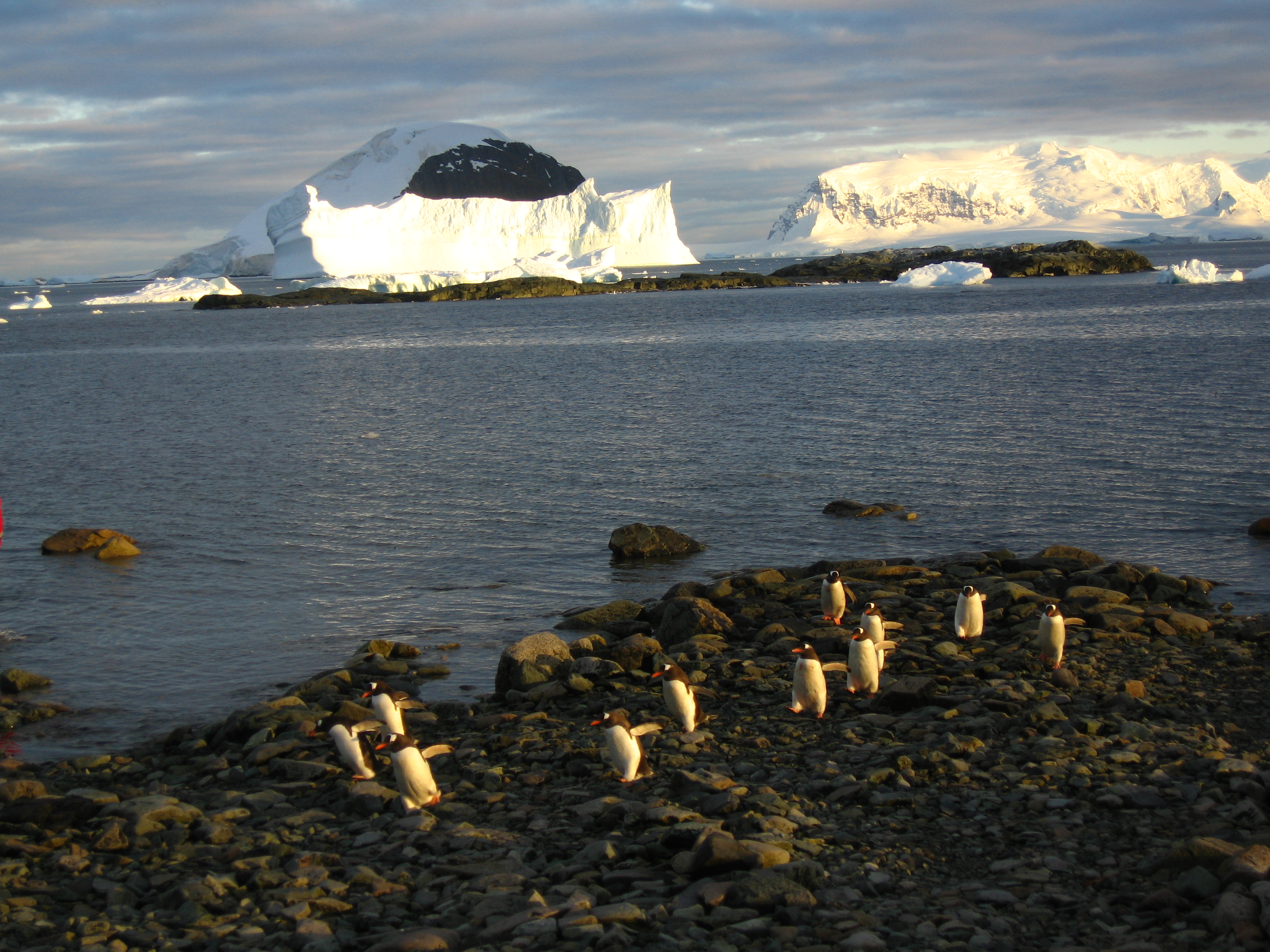
- Danco Island, February 2009

- Location within Antarctica Location within Antarctic Peninsula

Geography
- Location: Antarctica
- Coordinates: 64°44′S 62°37′W
- Highest elevation: 131 m (430 ft)
- Highest point: Danco Hill

Administration
- Administered under the Antarctic Treaty System

Demographics
- Population: Uninhabited

Danco Island or Isla Dedo is an island off Antarctica, 2 kilometres (1 nmi) long lying in the southern part of Errera Channel, off the west coast of Graham Land. It was charted by the Belgian Antarctic Expedition under Adrien de Gerlache, 1897–1899. Danco Island was surveyed by the Falkland Islands Dependencies Survey from Norsel in 1955, and named by the UK Antarctic Place-names Committee for Emile Danco (1869–1898), a Belgian geophysicist and member of the Belgian Antarctic Expedition, who died on board Belgica in the Antarctic.

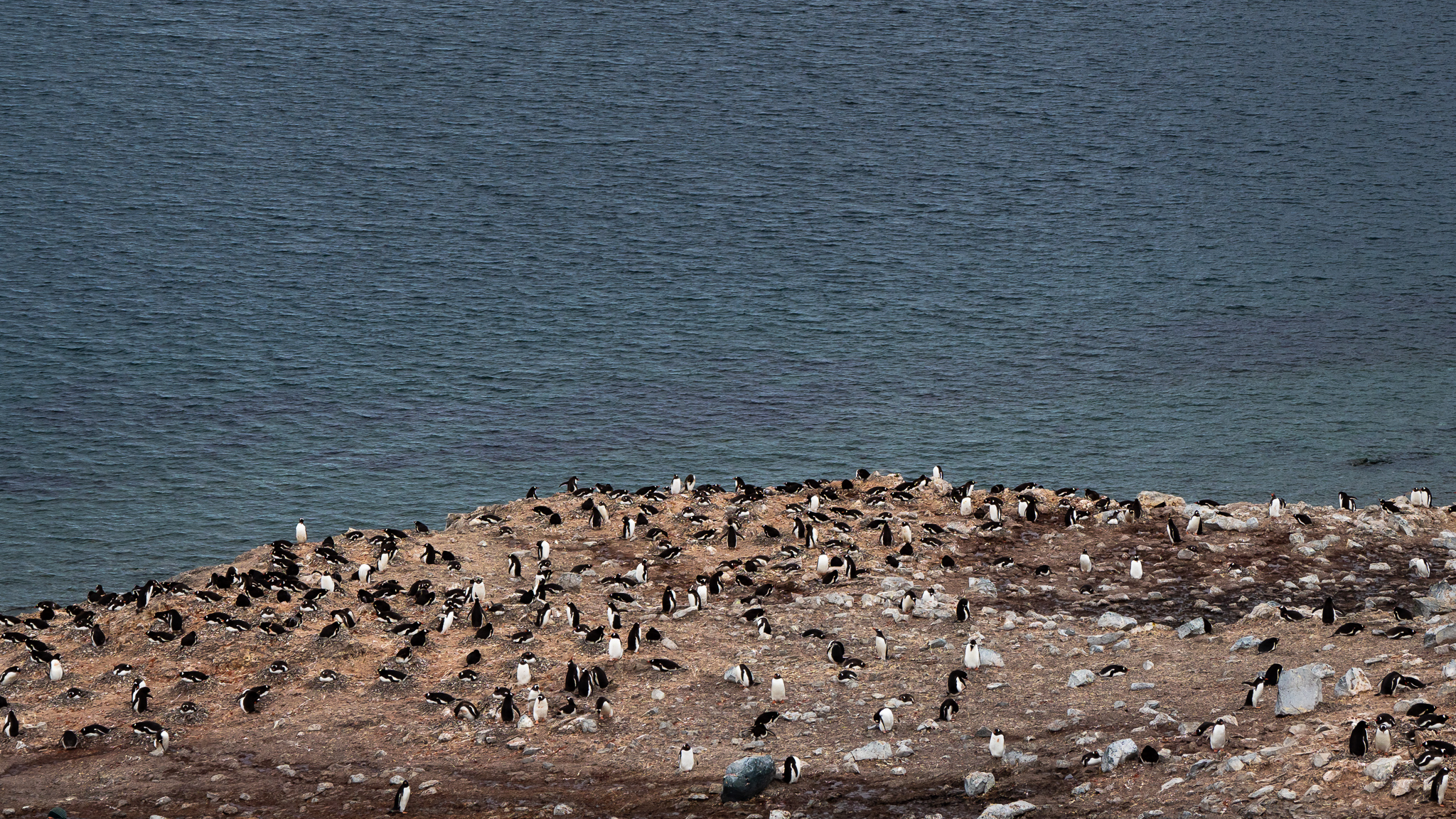
Gentoo penguin colony

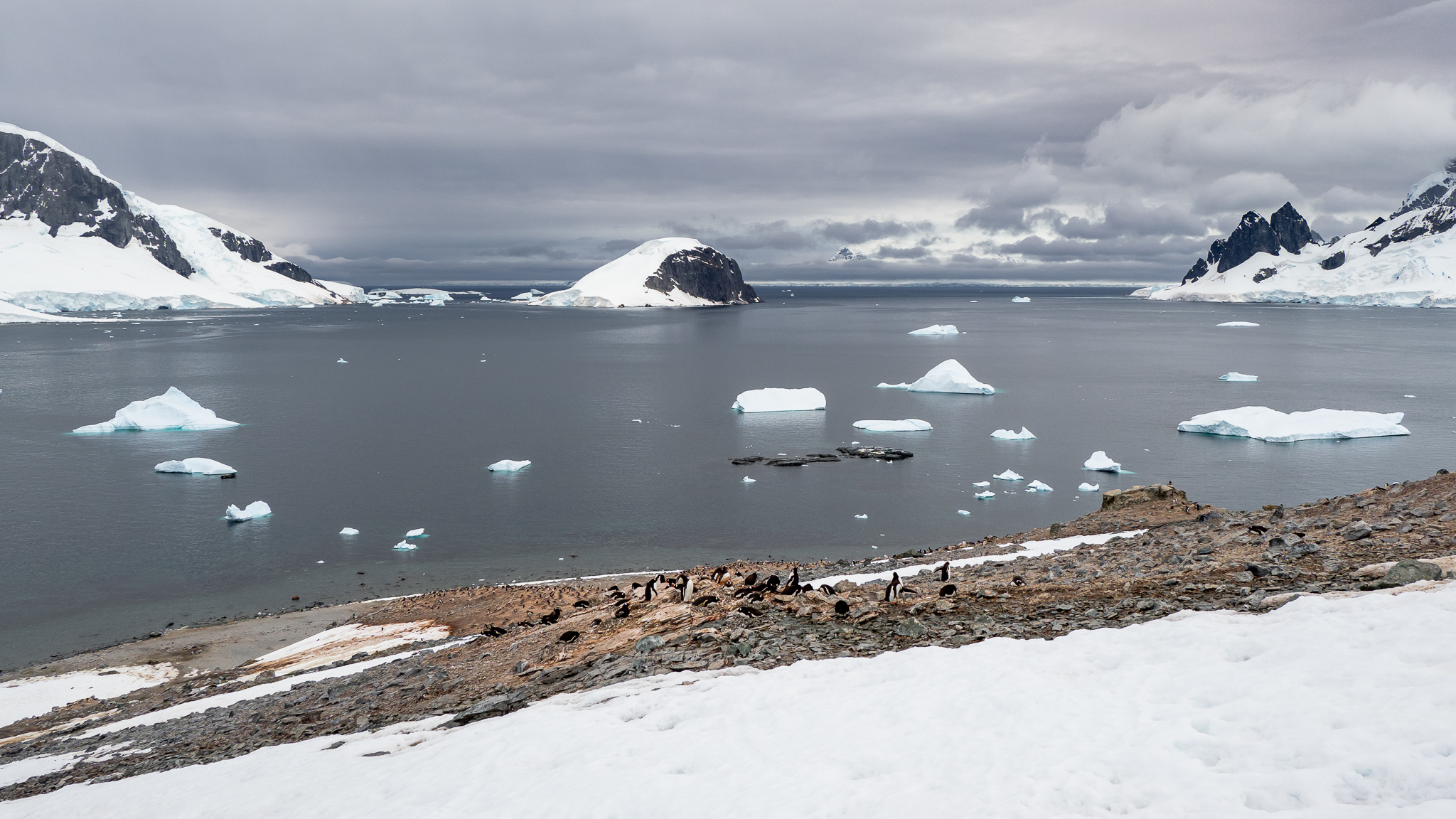
Danco Island

== Station O ==
Station O
- Antarctic research station
- Interactive map of Station O
- Coordinates: 64°44′00″S 62°36′00″W
- Established: 26 February 1956
- Demolished: April 2004

Government
  - Type: Administration
  - Body: BAS, United Kingdom
- Active times: All year-round

Danco Island was the location of the British research Station O. It was active from 26 February 1956 to 22 February 1959 with the intention of searching in the survey and geology. The main hut was named Arendal and was demolished and removed by The British Antarctic Survey in April 2004.

== See also ==
- List of Antarctic and sub-Antarctic islands
- List of Antarctic research stations
- List of Antarctic field camps
- Crime in Antarctica
