= Emen Island =

Island in Palmer Archipelago, Antarctica

- Location within Antarctic Peninsula

Geography
- Location: Antarctica
- Coordinates: 64°32′03″S 64°01′14″W
- Archipelago: Palmer Archipelago

Administration
- Administered under the Antarctic Treaty System

Demographics
- Population: 0

Emen Island (Bulgarian: остров Емен, romanized: ostrov Emen, IPA: [ˈɔstrof ˈɛmɛn]) is a rocky island in the southwest part of Hamburg Bay on the northwest coast of Anvers Island in the Palmer Archipelago, Antarctica. The feature is 920 m long in southeast-northwest direction and 580 m wide, and is separated from Anvers Island to the south and Petrelik Island to the northwest by 570 m and 160 m wide passages respectively.

The island is named after the village of Emen in Bulgaria.

== Location ==
Emen Island is located at 64°32′03″S 64°01′14″W, 10.45 km northeast of Gerlache Point and 8.77 km southwest of Bonnier Point. British mapping in 1974.

== Maps ==
- Anvers Island and Brabant Island. Scale 1:250000 topographic map. BAS 250 Series, Sheet SQ 19-20/3&4. London, 1974.
- Antarctic Digital Database (ADD). Scale 1:250000 topographic map of Antarctica. Scientific Committee on Antarctic Research (SCAR). Since 1993, regularly upgraded and updated.
