= Trebishte Island =

Island in Palmer Archipelago, Antarctica

Trebishte
- Location within Antarctic Peninsula

Geography
- Location: Antarctica
- Coordinates: 64°25′12″S 63°41′17″W
- Archipelago: Palmer Archipelago

Administration
- Administered under the Antarctic Treaty System

Demographics
- Population: 0

Trebishte Island (Bulgarian: остров Требище, romanized: ostrov Trebishte, IPA: [ˈɔstrof ˈtrɛbiʃtɛ]) is a rocky island 770 m long in southeast–northwest direction and 380 m wide lying in Perrier Bay on the northwest coast of Anvers Island in the Palmer Archipelago, Antarctica. It is separated from Anvers Island to the south and Vromos Island to the north by 300 m and 220 m wide passages respectively.

The island is named after the settlement of Trebishte in Southern Bulgaria.

== Location ==
Trebishte Island is located at 64°25′12″S 63°41′17″W, 5.07 km east-northeast of Giard Point and 11.45 km south of Quinton Point. British mapping in 1980.

== Maps ==
- British Antarctic Territory. Scale 1:200000 topographic map. DOS 610 Series, Sheet W 64 62. Directorate of Overseas Surveys, UK, 1980.
- Antarctic Digital Database (ADD). Scale 1:250000 topographic map of Antarctica. Scientific Committee on Antarctic Research (SCAR). Since 1993, regularly upgraded and updated.
