= Temenuga Island =

Island in Palmer Archipelago, Antarctica

Temenuga
- Location within Antarctic Peninsula

Geography
- Location: Antarctica
- Coordinates: 64°18′42″S 63°39′29″W
- Archipelago: Palmer Archipelago
- Length: 0.62 km (0.385 mi)
- Width: 0.45 km (0.28 mi)

Administration
- Administered under the Antarctic Treaty System

Demographics
- Population: 0

Temenuga Island (Bulgarian: остров Теменуга, romanized: ostrov Temenuga, IPA: [ˈɔstrof tɛmɛˈnuɡɐ]) is a rocky island lying 660 m northeast of Quinton Point, Goten Peninsula on the northwest coast of Anvers Island in the Palmer Archipelago, Antarctica. Temenuga is 620 m long by 450 m wide, and is separated from Kalotina Island to the west by a 140 m wide passage.

The island is named after the settlements of Temenuga in Northern and Southern Bulgaria.

== Location ==
Temenuga Island is located at 64°18′42″S 63°39′29″W. British mapping in 1980.

== Maps ==
- British Antarctic Territory. Scale 1:200000 topographic map. DOS 610 Series, Sheet W 64 62. Directorate of Overseas Surveys, UK, 1980.
- Antarctic Digital Database (ADD). Scale 1:250000 topographic map of Antarctica. Scientific Committee on Antarctic Research (SCAR). Since 1993, regularly upgraded and updated.
