= Kalotina Island =

Island in Palmer Archipelago, Antarctica

- Location within Antarctic Peninsula

Geography
- Location: Antarctica
- Coordinates: 64°18′38″S 63°40′18″W
- Archipelago: Palmer Archipelago

Administration
- Administered under the Antarctic Treaty System

Demographics
- Population: 0

Kalotina Island (Bulgarian: остров Калотина, romanized: ostrov Kalotina, IPA: [ˈɔstrof kɐˈɫɔtinɐ]) is a rocky island lying 470 m north of Quinton Point, Goten Peninsula on the northwest coast of Anvers Island in the Palmer Archipelago, Antarctica. The feature is 630 m long in southeast-northwest direction and 350 m wide, and separated from Temenuga Island to the east by a 140 m wide passage.

The island is named after the settlement of Kalotina in Western Bulgaria.

== Location ==
Kalotina Island is located at 64°18′38″S 63°40′18″W. British mapping in 1980.

== Maps ==
- British Antarctic Territory. Scale 1:200000 topographic map. DOS 610 Series, Sheet W 64 62. Directorate of Overseas Surveys, UK, 1980.
- Antarctic Digital Database (ADD). Scale 1:250000 topographic map of Antarctica. Scientific Committee on Antarctic Research (SCAR). Since 1993, regularly upgraded and updated.
