= Cormorant Island =

Island of Antarctica

- Location within Antarctica

Geography
- Location: Antarctica
- Coordinates: 64°48′S 63°58′W
- Archipelago: Palmer Archipelago

Administration
- Administered under the Antarctic Treaty System

Demographics
- Population: Uninhabited

Cormorant Island is a 10 ha island lying in Bismarck Strait 1 km south of Anvers Island, 4 km (2.5 mi) east-south-east of Bonaparte Point, in the Palmer Archipelago of Antarctica. It lies some 5 km to the south-east of the United States' Palmer Station in Arthur Harbour on Anvers Island. It was shown on an Argentine government chart of 1954, but not named. It was named by the United Kingdom Antarctic Place-names Committee (UK-APC) in 1958 because of the large number of cormorants (shags) seen there.

== Important Bird Area ==
The island has been identified as an Important Bird Area (IBA) by BirdLife International because it supports a breeding colony of over 700 pairs of Antarctic shags, one of the largest such colonies in the Antarctic Peninsula region. Other birds nesting at the site include Adélie penguins and southern giant petrels. The IBA is defined by the border of a Restricted Zone, under the Management Plan for ASMA 7 - Southwest Anvers Island and Palmer Basin, which includes, as well as the island, the surrounding marine area up to 50 m from the shoreline.

== See also ==
- List of Antarctic islands south of 60° S
