= Petrelik Island =

Island in the Palmer Archipelago, Antarctica

- Location within Antarctic Peninsula

Geography
- Location: Antarctica
- Coordinates: 64°31′46″S 64°01′56″W
- Archipelago: Palmer Archipelago

Administration
- Administered under the Antarctic Treaty System

Demographics
- Population: Uninhabited

Petrelik Island (Bulgarian: остров Петрелик, romanized: ostrov Petrelik, IPA: [ˈɔstrof pɛtrɛˈlik]) is a rocky island in the southwest part of Hamburg Bay on the northwest coast of Anvers Island in the Palmer Archipelago, Antarctica. The feature is 380 m long in southwest-northeast direction and 200 m wide, and is separated from Emen Island to the southeast by a 160 m wide passage.

The island is named after the settlement of Petrelik in Southwestern Bulgaria.

== Location ==
Petrelik Island is located at 64°31′46″S 64°01′56″W, 10.34 km northeast of Gerlache Point and 8.85 km southwest of Bonnier Point. British mapping in 1974.

== Maps ==
- Anvers Island and Brabant Island. Scale 1:250000 topographic map. BAS 250 Series, Sheet SQ 19-20/3&4. London, 1974.
- Antarctic Digital Database (ADD). Scale 1:250000 topographic map of Antarctica. Scientific Committee on Antarctic Research (SCAR). Since 1993, regularly upgraded and updated.
