= Dakers Island =

Island in Palmer Archipelago, Antarctica

Dakers Island (64°46′S 64°23′W) is an island between Hartshorne Island and McGuire Island in the eastern Joubin Islands. It was named by the Advisory Committee on Antarctic Names for Hugh B. Dakers, a cook in RV Hero on her first Antarctic voyage to Palmer Station in 1968.

== See also ==
- List of Antarctic and sub-Antarctic islands
