= Masteyra Island =

Island of the Palmer Archipelago in Antarctica

- Location within Antarctica

Geography
- Location: Antarctica
- Coordinates: 64°22′32″S 63°41′47″W
- Archipelago: Palmer Archipelago
- Length: 700 m (2300 ft)
- Width: 200 m (700 ft)

Administration
- Administered under the Antarctic Treaty System

Demographics
- Population: Uninhabited

Masteyra Island (Bulgarian: остров Мастейра, romanized: ostrov Masteyra, IPA: [ˈɔstrof mɐˈstɛjrɐ]) is a rocky island 700 m long in east-west direction and 200 m wide lying in Perrier Bay on the northwest coast of Anvers Island in the Palmer Archipelago, Antarctica. It is separated from Anvers Island to the east-southeast by a 1.13 km wide passage.

The island is named after the ancient Thracian settlement and fortress of Masteyra in Southern Bulgaria.

== Location ==
Masteyra Island is located at 64°22′32″S 63°41′47″W, 6.58 km south of Quinton Point, 4.21 km north of Vromos Island and 7.55 km east-northeast of Giard Point. British mapping in 1980.

== Maps ==
- British Antarctic Territory. Scale 1:200000 topographic map. DOS 610 Series, Sheet W 64 62. Directorate of Overseas Surveys, UK, 1980.
- Antarctic Digital Database (ADD). Scale 1:250000 topographic map of Antarctica. Scientific Committee on Antarctic Research (SCAR). Since 1993, regularly upgraded and updated.
