= Giard =

Giard may refer to:

== People ==
- Giard (surname)

== Places ==
- Giard Township, Clayton County, Iowa, township in Clayton County, Iowa, United States
- Giard, Iowa, unincorporated community in Clayton County, Iowa, United States
- Giard Point, a point forming the south side of the entrance to Perrier Bay, on the northwest coast of Anvers Island in the Palmer Archipelago in Antarctica
