= Stay Away =

Stay Away may refer to:

== Songs ==
- "Stay Away" (Elvis Presley song), 1968
- "Stay Away" (L'Arc-en-Ciel song), 2000
- "Stayaway", by Muna, 2019
- "Stay Away", by the Angels from Watch the Red, 1983
- "Stay Away", by Barbra Streisand from Songbird, 1978
- "Stay Away", by Carly Rae Jepsen from Dedicated Side B, 2020
- "Stay Away", by Charli XCX from True Romance, 2013
- "Stay Away", by Chris Thile from How to Grow a Woman from the Ground, 2006
- "Stay Away", by Dave Barnes from Chasing Mississippi, 2006
- "Stay Away", by E-40 from The D-Boy Diary: Book 1, 2016
- "Stay Away", by Erik Hassle from Mariefred Sessions, 2011
- "Stay Away", by Falling in Reverse from Just Like You, 2015
- "Stay Away", by G Hannelius, 2014
- "Stay Away", by the Honorary Title from Scream & Light Up the Sky, 2007
- "Stay Away", by I Prevail from Violent Nature, 2025
- "Stay Away", by Kim Carnes from St. Vincent's Court, 1979
- "Stay Away", by L.A. Guns from The Devil You Know, 2019
- "Stay Away", by Lee DeWyze from Frames, 2013
- "Stay Away", by Mod Sun, 2020
- "Stay Away", by Nirvana from Nevermind, 1991
- "Stay Away", by Pain from Dancing with the Dead, 2005
- "Stay Away", by Randy Newman, 2020
- "Stay Away", by Rooney from Rooney, 2003
- "Stay Away", by Secondhand Serenade from Hear Me Now, 2010
- "Stay Away", by Toto from The Seventh One, 1988
- "I Stay Away" by Alice In Chains, 1994

== Other uses ==
- Stay-away, in Zimbabwe and South Africa, a type of labor strike
- Stay away (card game), or Polignac, a trick-taking game
- Stayaway Skerries, Antarctica
- Stay Away (advertisement), a campaign of Amsterdam targeting British tourists aged 18 to 35
