= Vromos Island =

Island in Palmer Archipelago, Antarctica

Vromos
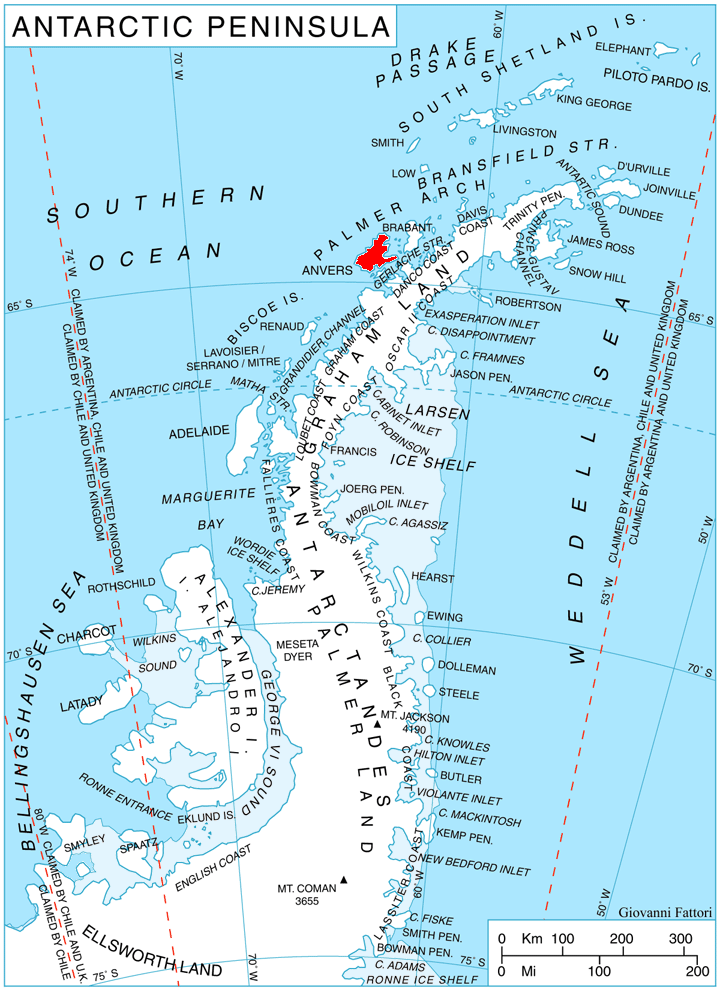
- Location of Anvers Island in the Antarctic Peninsula region.

Geography
- Location: Antarctica
- Coordinates: 64°24′55″S 63°41′36″W
- Archipelago: Palmer Archipelago

Administration
- Administered under the Antarctic Treaty System

Demographics
- Population: 0

Vromos Island (Bulgarian: остров Вромос, romanized: ostrov Vromos, IPA: [ˈɔstrov vroˈmɔs]) is a rocky island 600 m long in east-west direction and 260 m wide lying in Perrier Bay on the northwest coast of Anvers Island in the Palmer Archipelago, Antarctica. It is separated from Trebishte Island to the south by a 300 m wide passage.

The island is named after Vromos Bay on the Bulgarian Black Sea Coast.

== Location ==
Vromos Island is located at 64°24′55″S 63°41′36″W, 5.07 km east-northeast of Giard Point, 5.21 km south of Masteyra Island and 11.45 km south of Quinton Point. British mapping in 1980.

== Maps ==
- British Antarctic Territory. Scale 1:200000 topographic map. DOS 610 Series, Sheet W 64 62. Directorate of Overseas Surveys, UK, 1980.
- Antarctic Digital Database (ADD). Scale 1:250000 topographic map of Antarctica. Scientific Committee on Antarctic Research (SCAR). Since 1993, regularly upgraded and updated.
