= Robbins Island =

Robbins Island may refer to:

- Robbins Island (Antarctica)
- Robbins Island (Tasmania)

== See also ==
- Robben Island, Cape Province, South Africa
- Robins Island, Long Island, New York, U.S.A.
