= Rosenthal Islands =

Islands of Antarctica

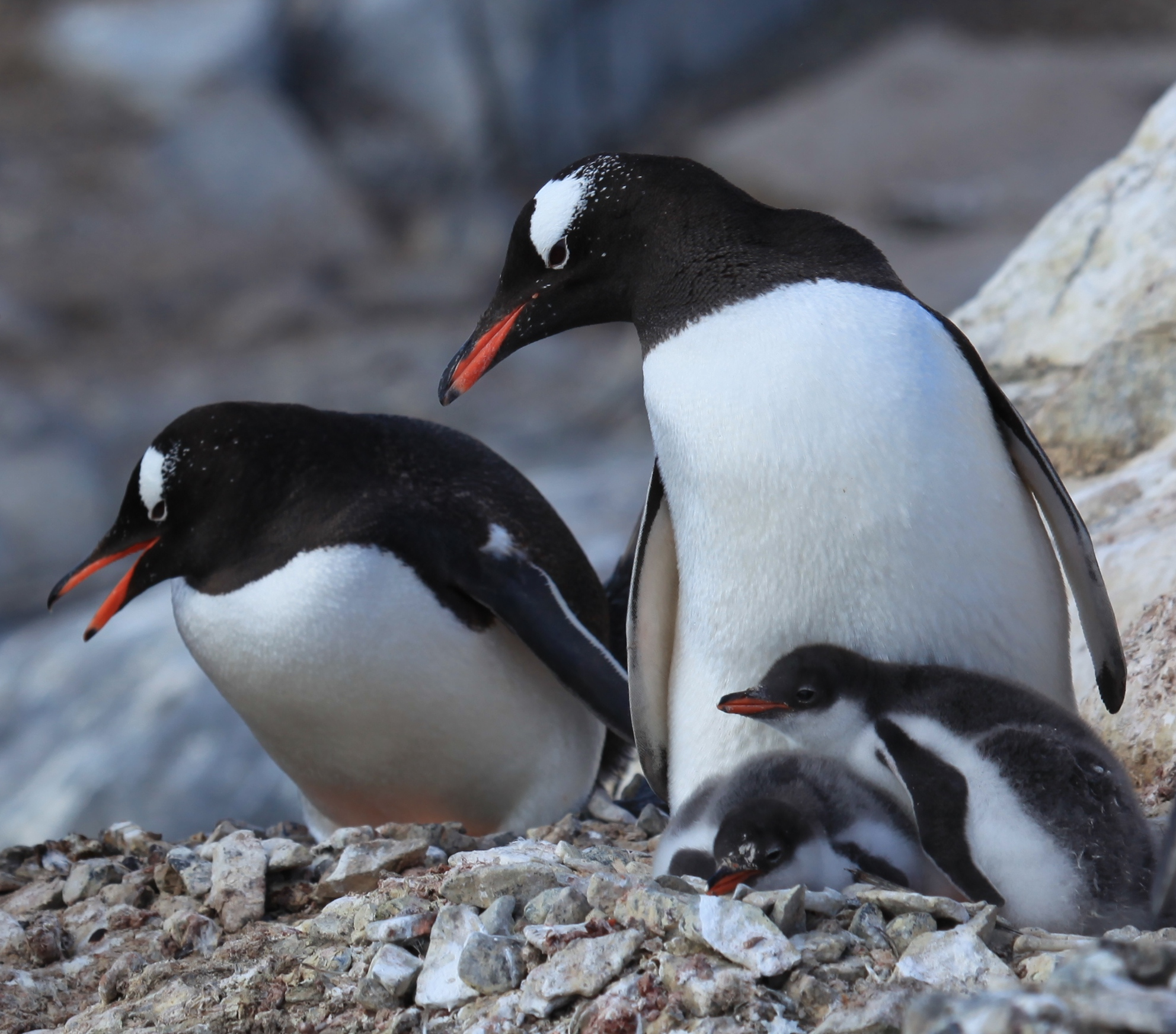
- Gentoo penguins breed in the IBA

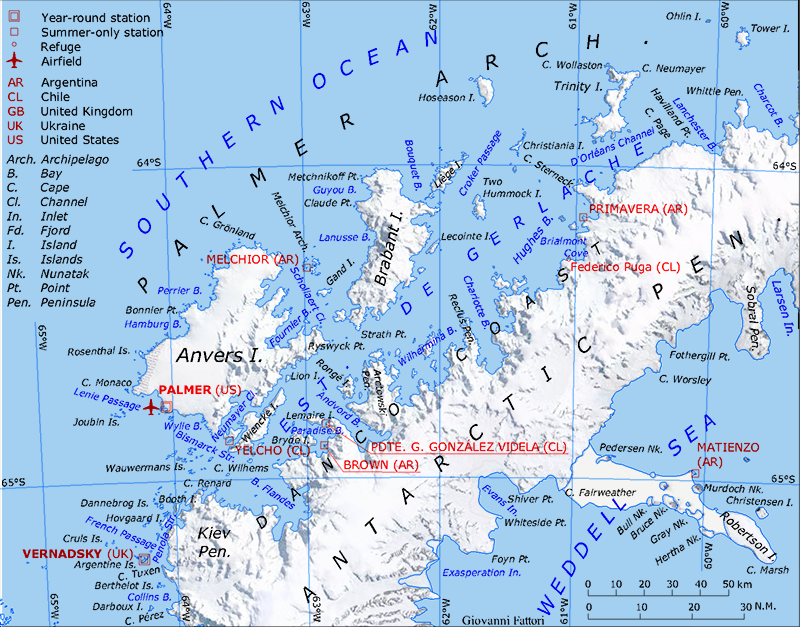
- Rosenthal Islands are off the west coast of Anvers Island

- Location in Antarctica Rosenthal Islands (Antarctica)

Geography
- Location: Palmer Archipelago, Graham Land, Antarctica
- Coordinates: 64°35′59″S 64°15′00″W
- Archipelago: Rosenthal Islands
- Total islands: 80
- Major islands: Gerlache Island

Administration
- Administered under the Antarctic Treaty System

Demographics
- Population: Uninhabited

The Rosenthal Islands are a group of about islands fringing the west coast of Anvers Island, 11 km (6.8 mi) north of Cape Monaco, in the Palmer Archipelago of Antarctica.

== Description ==
The largest of the islands is Gerlache, which is about 2.5 km long by 1.2 km wide; it rises to a height of 100 m and has a permanent ice-cap. The smaller islands are all less than 500 m across and 100 m in height, and generally ice-free. The islands and adjacent peninsulas are generally rugged, rocky and exposed. The more seaward islands are steeper, with numerous offshore islets and rocks, mostly uncharted. Several islands and peninsulas close to Anvers Island have gentler topography and more accessible shorelines. The nearest permanent research station is the USA's Palmer, 20 km to the east at Arthur Harbour, southern Anvers Island.

== Discovery and naming ==
The islands were discovered by a German expedition to Antarctic waters in 1873–74, under Eduard Dallmann, and named by him for Albert Rosenthal, Director of the Society for Polar Navigation (Deutsche Polar-Schifffahrtsgesellschaft) who, with the Society, sponsored the expedition.

== Important Bird Area ==
A 11,081 ha site, including Gerlache Island and extending 8 km south of the main Rosenthal group to include 35 ice-free islands and peninsulas, has been designated an Important Bird Area (IBA) by BirdLife International, because it supports some 7,300 breeding pairs of Gentoo penguins. Other birds known to breed in the islands include Adélie and chinstrap penguins, southern giant petrels, Antarctic terns, Antarctic shags, kelp gulls and south polar skuas. Other probable breeders are Wilson's storm petrels and snowy sheathbills. The IBA lies within Antarctic Specially Managed Area (ASMA) No.7 - Southwest Anvers Island and Palmer Basin.

== See also ==
- List of Antarctic and Subantarctic islands
