= Hartshorne Island =

Antarctic island

Hartshorne Island (64°47′S 64°23′W) is an island between Dakers Island and Howard Island in the eastern Joubin Islands, Antarctica. It was named by the Advisory Committee on Antarctic Names for Sidney G. Hartshorne, Master of RV Hero on her first Antarctic voyage to Palmer Station in 1968.

== See also ==
- List of Antarctic and subantarctic islands
