= Chukovezer Island =

Island in Palmer Archipelago, Antarctica

- Location within Antarctic Peninsula

Geography
- Location: Antarctica
- Coordinates: 64°39′06″S 64°14′42″W
- Archipelago: Palmer Archipelago

Administration
- Administered under the Antarctic Treaty System

Demographics
- Population: 0

Chukovezer Island (Bulgarian: остров Чуковезер, romanized: ostrov Chukovezer, IPA: [ˈɔstrof t͡ʃokoˈvɛzɛr]) is the rocky island lying 700 m (2,300 ft) off the northwest coast of Anvers Island in the Palmer Archipelago, Antarctica. The feature is 1.22 km (0.76 mi) long in southeast-northwest direction and 460 m (1,510 ft) wide.

The island is named after the settlement of Chukovezer in Western Bulgaria.

== Location ==
Chukovezer Island is located at 64°39′06″S 64°14′42″W, 7.22 km (4.49 mi) north by east of Cape Monaco and 6.8 km (4.2 mi) south of Gerlache Point. British mapping in 1974.

== Maps ==
- Anvers Island and Brabant Island. Scale 1:250000 topographic map. BAS 250 Series, Sheet SQ 19-20/3&4. London, 1974.
- Antarctic Digital Database (ADD). Scale 1:250000 topographic map of Antarctica. Scientific Committee on Antarctic Research (SCAR). Since 1993, regularly upgraded and updated.
