= Beaumont Skerries =

Island group in Palmer Archipelago, Antarctica

- Location within Antarctica

Geography
- Location: Antarctica
- Coordinates: 64°46′S 64°19′W

Administration
- Administered under the Antarctic Treaty System

Demographics
- Population: Uninhabited

The Beaumont Skerries are two small islands and several rocks 2 kilometres (1 nmi) east of the Joubin Islands, off the southwest coast of Anvers Island. They were named by the Advisory Committee on Antarctic Names for Malcolm J. Beaumont, an Electronics Technician in RV Hero on her first Antarctic voyage, reaching nearby Palmer Station on Christmas Eve, 1968.
