= Blue Glacier to Cape Chocolate Important Bird Area =

Important Bird Area in Antarctica

Coordinates: 77°53′30″S 164°30′18″E

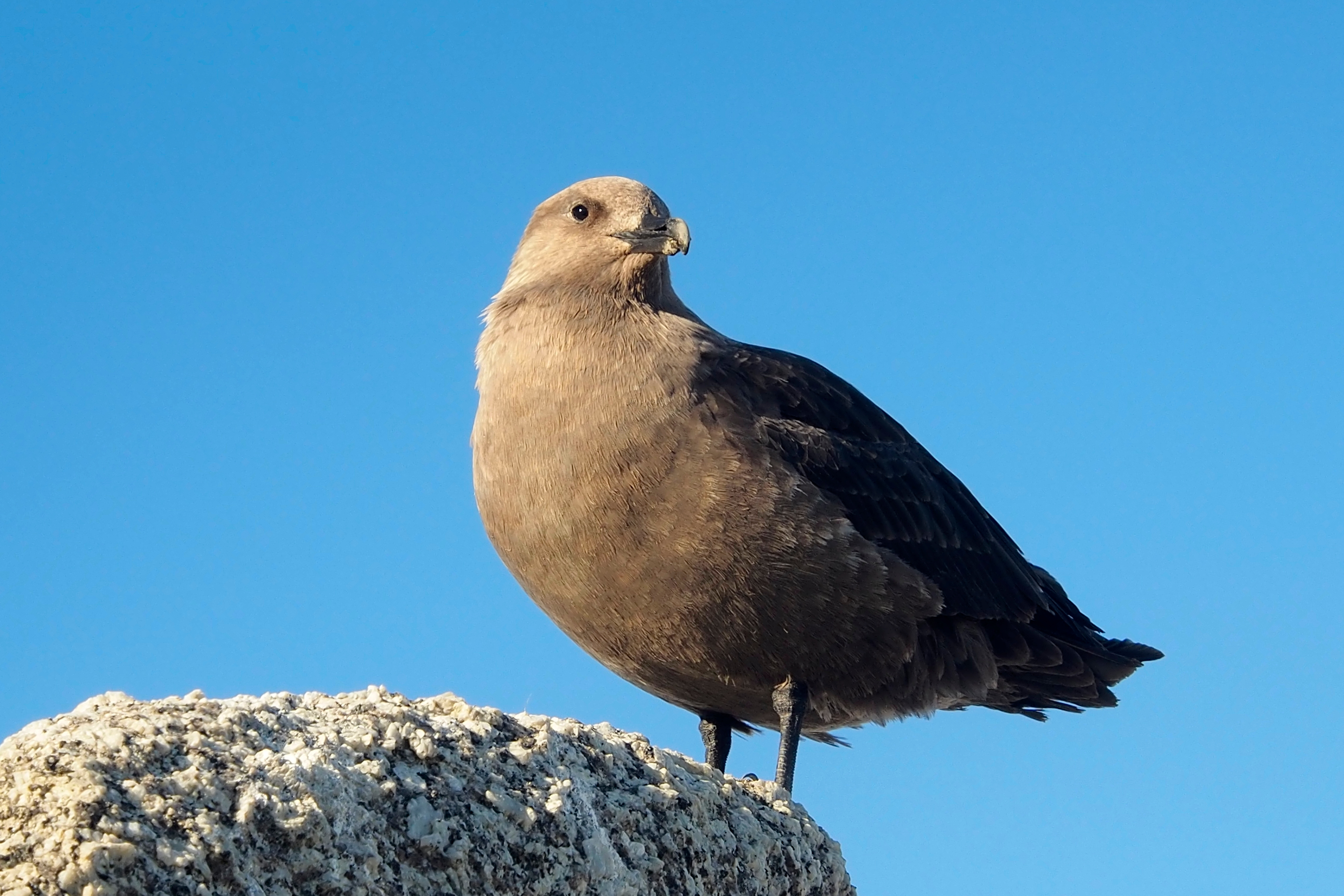
South polar skuas breed in the IBA

The Blue Glacier to Cape Chocolate Important Bird Area is a 1,206 ha tract of ice-free land running for 10 km south from Blue Glacier towards Cape Chocolate along the Scott Coast of southern Victoria Land, Antarctica. It has been identified as an Important Bird Area (IBA) by BirdLife International because in 1981 it supported an estimated 226 breeding pairs of south polar skuas. It lies within the McMurdo Dry Valleys Antarctic Specially Managed Area.
