= Howard Island (Antarctica) =

Island in the Palmer Archipelago, Antarctica

- Location within Antarctica
- Etymology: Judson R. Howard, mate in the RV Hero

Geography
- Coordinates: 64°47′S 64°23′W
- Archipelago: Palmer Archipelago

Howard Island is an island directly south of Hartshorne Island in eastern Joubin Islands, at the south-western end of the Palmer Archipelago of Antarctica. It was named by the US Advisory Committee on Antarctic Names (US-ACAN) for Judson R. Howard, mate in the RV Hero on her first voyage to Palmer Station in 1968.

== See also ==
- List of Antarctic and sub-Antarctic islands
