= Skane Nunatak =

Nunatak in Palmer Archipelago, Antarctica

Skane Nunatak (64°43′02″S 64°16′36″W) is a distinctive nunatak rising to 130 metres (430 ft) 0.4 nautical miles (0.74 km) east of Cape Monaco on Anvers Island in the Palmer Archipelago. It was amed by the Advisory Committee on Antarctic Names in 2007 after Richard J. Skane, carpenter foreman in support of the US Antarctic Program at McMurdo Station for four field seasons from 1979; and at Palmer Station for ten field seasons including two winters, from 1986 to 1996.
