= McGuire Island (Antarctica) =

McGuire Island (64°46′S 64°24′W) is an island in the northeast portion of the Joubin Islands, Antarctica. It was named by the Advisory Committee on Antarctic Names for Thomas J. McGuire, an oiler in RV Hero in her first voyage to Antarctica and Palmer Station in 1968.

== See also ==
- List of Antarctic and sub-Antarctic islands
