= Obitel Peninsula =

Peninsula in Antarctica

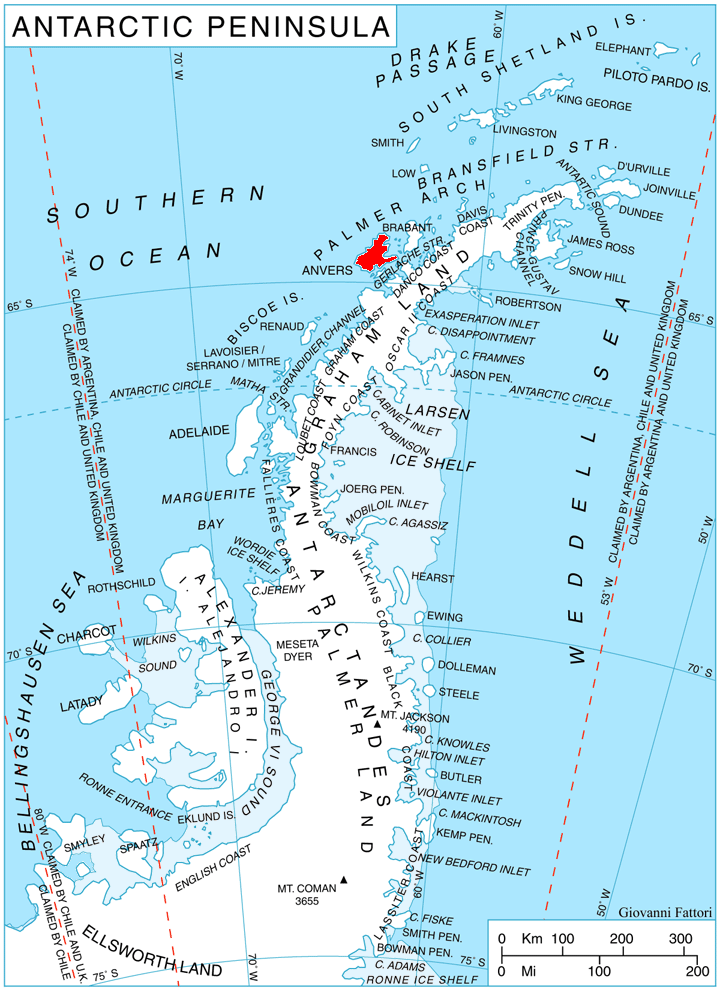
Location of Anvers Island in the Antarctic Peninsula region.

Obitel Peninsula (Bulgarian: полуостров Обител, romanized: poluostrov Obitel, IPA: [poɫuˈɔstrof oˈbitɛɫ]) is the mostly ice-covered peninsula wide 6.9 km and indenting for 6.6 km northwestwards between Hamburg Bay and Perrier Bay on the northwest coast of Anvers Island in the Palmer Archipelago, Antarctica. It ends up in Bonnier Point to the west and Giard Point to the north.

The peninsula is named after the settlement of Obitel in Northeastern Bulgaria.

== Location ==
Obitel Peninsula is centred at 64°28′20″S 63°50′00″W. British mapping in 1980.

== Maps ==
- British Antarctic Territory. Scale 1:200000 topographic map. DOS 610 Series, Sheet W 64 62. Directorate of Overseas Surveys, UK, 1980.
- Antarctic Digital Database (ADD). Scale 1:250000 topographic map of Antarctica. Scientific Committee on Antarctic Research (SCAR). Since 1993, regularly upgraded and updated.
