= Southwest Anvers Island and Palmer Basin =

Antarctic Specially Managed Area in the Antarctic Peninsula

Coordinates: 64°50′S 64°00′W

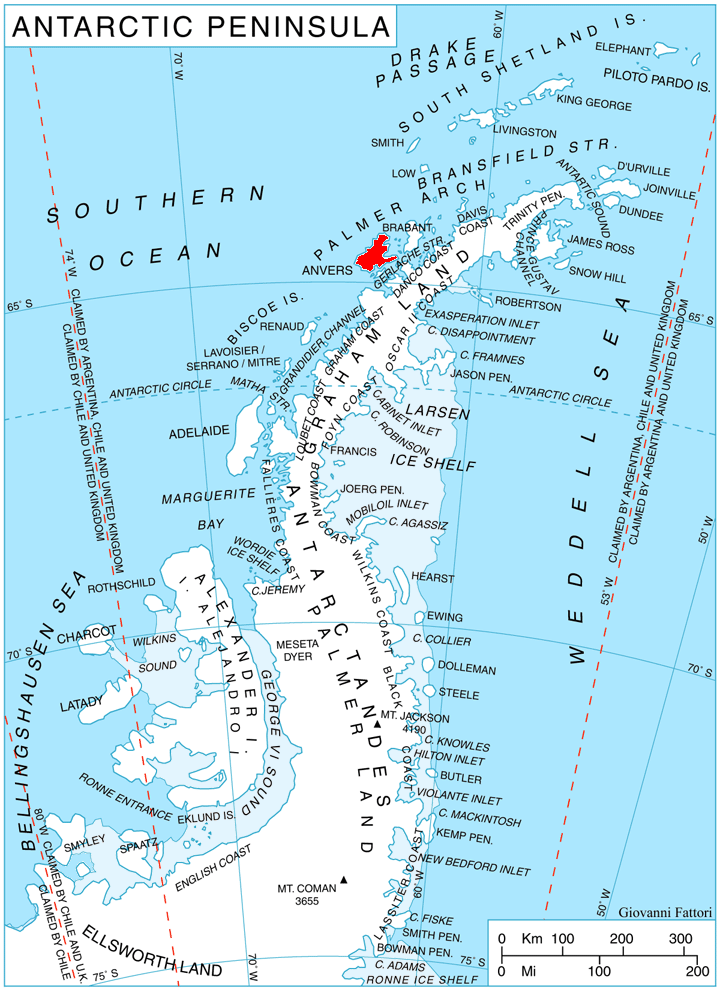
Location map of Anvers Island in relation to the Antarctic Peninsula

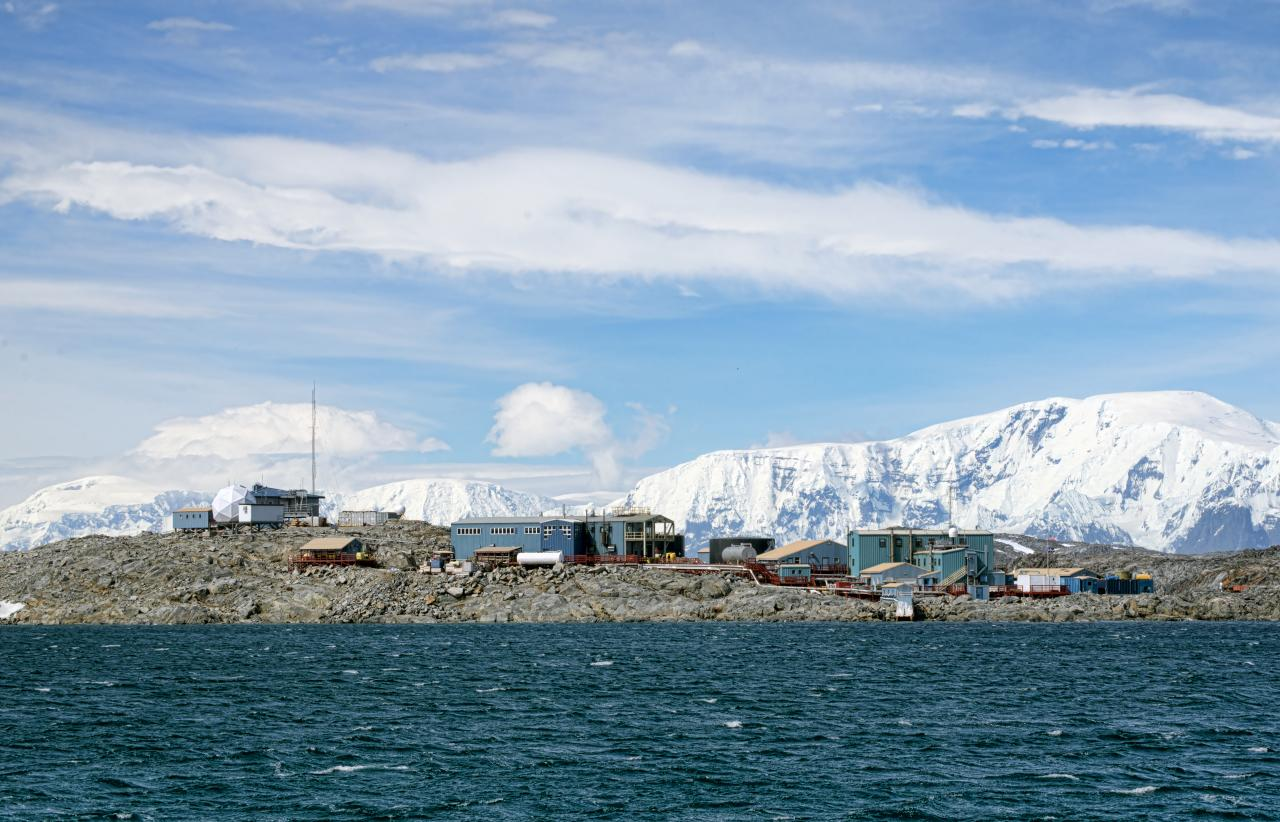
Palmer Station on Arthur Harbour, with a backdrop of the Marr Ice Piedmont

Southwest Anvers Island and Palmer Basin is a 3275 km^{2} Antarctic Specially Managed Area (ASMA 7). It lies towards the northern end of the Antarctic Peninsula, encompassing the south-western coastline of Anvers Island, in the Palmer Archipelago, with the adjacent deep marine waters of the Palmer Basin, the shallower Bismarck Strait, and fringing island groups.

== Description ==
Features of the south-west coastline of Anvers Island include the United States’ Palmer Station on Arthur Harbour - an LTER site and the principal logistical centre for research within AMSA 7, as well as the ice cliffs of the Marr Ice Piedmont, the ice-free Capes Monaco and Lancaster, and Biscoe Point. The waters of the Palmer Basin extend to a maximum depth of over 1400 m and are surrounded by shallower waters mostly no more than 600 m deep.

The island groups include the Rosenthal and Joubin Islands to the north of the Basin, as well as the Wauwermans, Dannebrog and Vedel Islands of the Wilhelm Archipelago to the east and south. The area also contains several small coastal islands in the vicinity of Cape Monaco and Palmer Station. Sixteen sites within the area have had access to them restricted in order to protect their natural values and others have been identified as Important Bird Areas. Two have been given additional protection as Antarctic Specially Protected Areas – Litchfield Island (ASPA 113) and Biscoe Point (ASPA 139).

The area contains diverse and accessible assemblages of terrestrial and marine flora and fauna which have been subject to long-term monitoring, with some datasets covering much of the last century, with intensive scientific interest beginning in the 1950s. Studies include monitoring of bird and seal populations, surveys of terrestrial and sub-tidal environments, investigations into the physiology, biochemistry, ecology and behaviour of birds, seals, terrestrial invertebrates and zooplankton, as well as oceanography, marine sedimentology and geomorphology. The area is exceptionally important for long-term studies of both natural variability and human impact on Antarctic ecosystems, and for understanding the linkages among birds, krill dynamics and the changing marine habitat.
