= Gossler Islands =

Grouping within an Antarctic archipelago

Gossler Islands (64°42′S 64°22′W) are a group of north–south trending islands 3 nautical miles (6 km) in extent, lying 1.5 nautical miles (3 km) west of Cape Monaco, Anvers Island, in the Palmer Archipelago off Antarctica.

They were discovered and named by a German expedition under Eduard Dallmann, 1873–74, in honour of the Gossler banking family of Hamburg. The expedition was funded by the Deutsche Polar-Schifffahrtsgesellschaft shipping company, which was co-owned by Ernst Gossler (1838–1893), a grandson of Senator Johann Heinrich Gossler and a great-grandson of Johann Hinrich Gossler.

== See also ==
- List of Antarctic and sub-Antarctic islands
