= Hamburg Bay =

Bay of Anvers Island, Antarctica

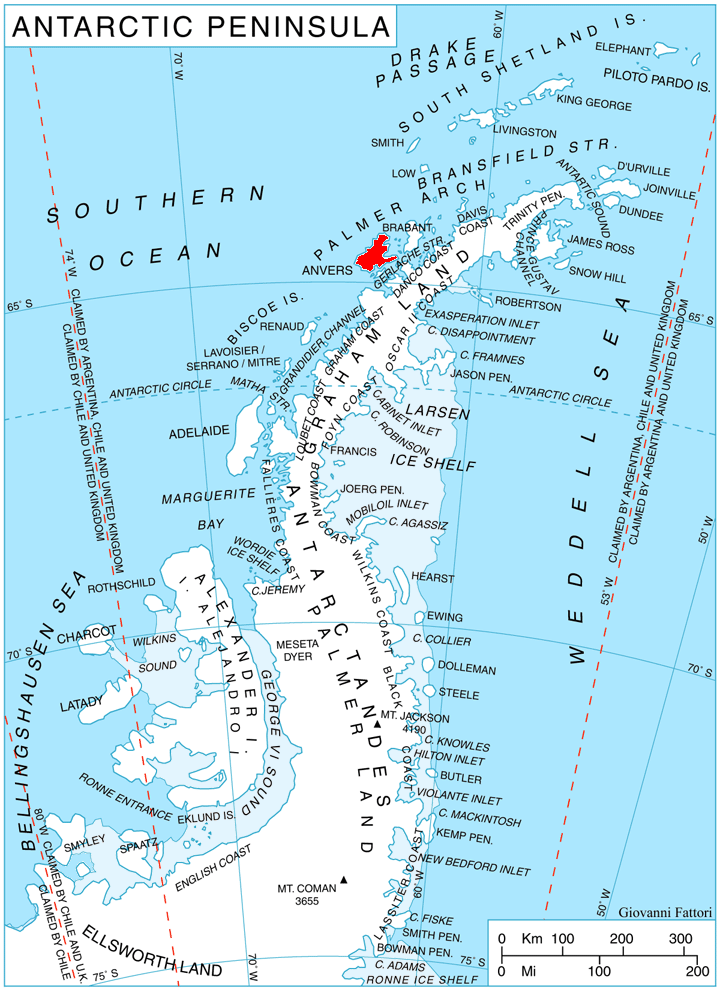
Location of Anvers Island in the Antarctic Peninsula region.

Hamburg Bay (64°30′S 63°57′W) is a bay indenting the northwest coast of Anvers Island in the Palmer Archipelago, Antarctica immediately south of Bonnier Point, Obitel Peninsula, Emen Island, and Petrelik Island are located in the southwest part of the bay.

The bay was discovered but incompletely defined by a German expedition in 1873–74 under the command of Eduard Dallmann, who named it for Hamburg, Germany, the home port of the expedition. The bay was more accurately mapped by the French Antarctic Expedition, 1903–05, under Jean-Baptiste Charcot.

== Maps ==
- British Antarctic Territory. Scale 1:200000 topographic map. DOS 610 Series, Sheet W 64 62. Directorate of Overseas Surveys, UK, 1980.
- Antarctic Digital Database (ADD). Scale 1:250000 topographic map of Antarctica. Scientific Committee on Antarctic Research (SCAR), 1993–2016.
