= Perrier Bay =

Bay in Antarctica

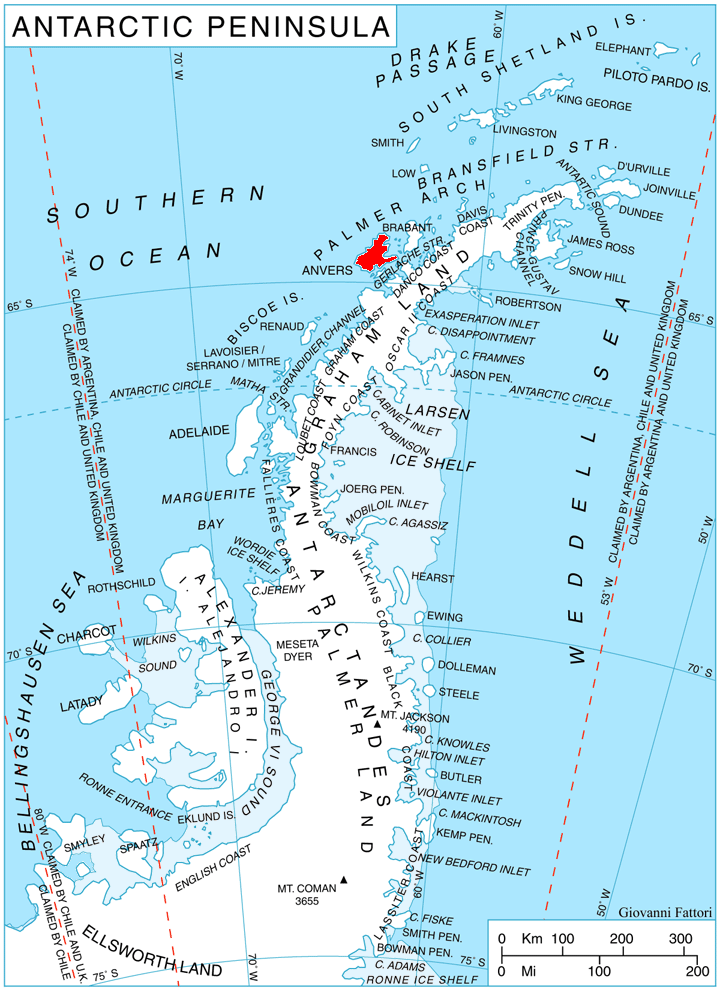
Location of Anvers Island in the Antarctic Peninsula region.

Perrier Bay (64°23′S 63°45′W) is a bay 6 nautical miles (11 km) wide indenting the northwest coast of Anvers Island in the Palmer Archipelago, Antarctica between Obitel Peninsula and Goten Peninsula. It is entered north of Giard Point and south of Quinton Point. Masteyra Island is lying in the north part of the bay, and Trebishte Island and Vromos Island in its south part.

The bay was discovered by the French Antarctic Expedition, 1903–05, and named by Charcot for Edmond Perrier, French naturalist.

== Maps ==
- British Antarctic Territory. Scale 1:200000 topographic map. DOS 610 Series, Sheet W 64 62. Directorate of Overseas Surveys, UK, 1980.
- Antarctic Digital Database (ADD). Scale 1:250000 topographic map of Antarctica. Scientific Committee on Antarctic Research (SCAR), 1993–2016.
