= Robbins Island (Antarctica) =

Island in Palmer Archipelago, Antarctica

Robbins Island (64°47′S 64°27′W) is one of the southwestern Joubin Islands, off the southwest coast of Anvers Island. It was named by the Advisory Committee on Antarctic Names (US-ACAN) for Stephen H. Robbins, Jr., an Able Seaman in the R.V. Hero in her first voyage to Antarctica in 1968.

== See also ==
- List of Antarctic and sub-Antarctic islands
