= Gerlache Island =

Island in the Palmer Archipelago, Antarctica

Coordinates: 64°35′S 64°16′W

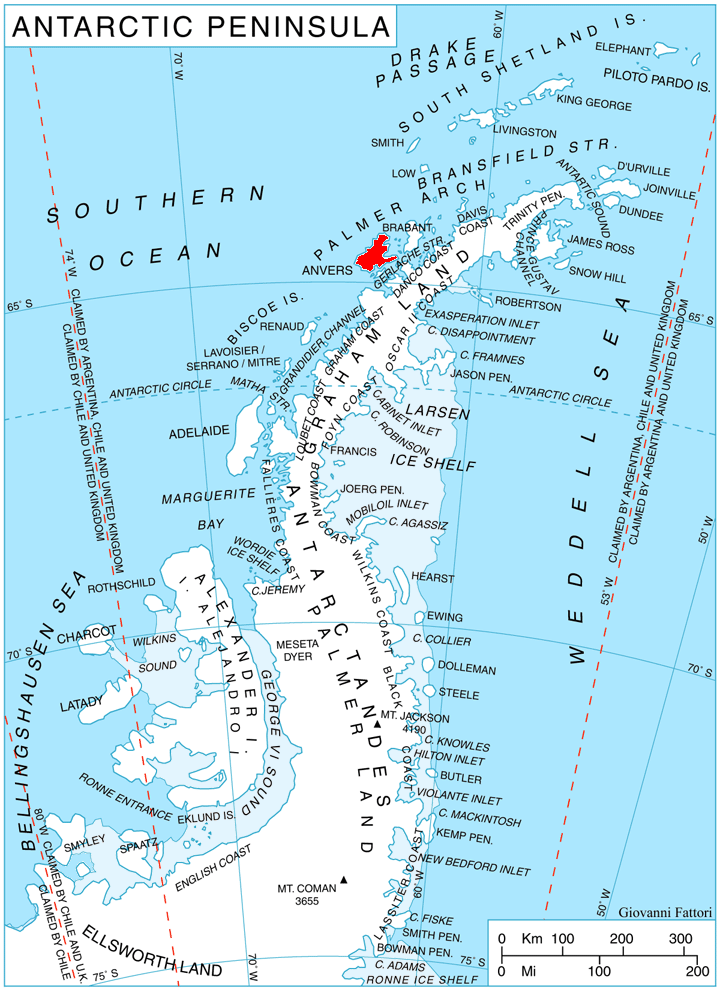
Location of Anvers Island in the Antarctic Peninsula region.

Gerlache Island is the largest of the Rosenthal Islands lying off Gerlache Point on the west coast of Anvers Island, in the Palmer Archipelago of Antarctica. It was first roughly charted and named "Pointe de Gerlache" by the French Antarctic Expedition, 1903–05, under Jean-Baptiste Charcot, for Lieutenant Adrien de Gerlache. As a result of surveys by the Falkland Islands Dependencies Survey in 1956–58, this island is considered to be the feature named by Charcot; there is no prominent point in this vicinity which would be visible from seaward.

== Important Bird Area ==
Gerlache forms part of the Rosenthal Islands Important Bird Area (IBA), designated as such by BirdLife International because it supports a breeding colony of gentoo penguins, with about 3000 pairs recorded there in 1987. It lies within ASMA 7 - Southwest Anvers Island and Palmer Basin.

== See also ==
- List of Antarctic and subantarctic islands
