= Stay Away (advertisement) =

Anti-tourist ad in Amsterdam

Stay Away was a large-scale advertisement campaign launched by the city of Amsterdam targeting British tourists aged 18 to 35. The ad campaign, started in March of 2023, was intended to limit the over-tourism of young British men who travelled to the city primarily to party.

== Overview ==
=== Background ===
Due to its more lax drug policy that allows for the sale of "soft drugs" like cannabis within designated coffeeshops, the Netherlands had long seen large amounts of drug tourism from foreigners. Amsterdam, especially, saw large amounts of sex tourism in addition to the drug tourism as a result of its well-known red light district. With nearly 20 million tourists visiting the city every year as opposed to its 1 million residents, residents of the city would often complain about unruly groups of tourists who would reportedly urinate in public, make constant noise, get excessively drunk, and overcrowd the streets. In an effort to curb the "nuisance tourism", the city launched its "stay away" campaign in 2023 in an effort to deter the crowds.

=== Advertising ===
The first video advertisement put out in the advertising campaign.

In 2023, the government of Amsterdam launched an online advertising campaign targeted at British males aged 18 to 35. The specific target demographic was a result of research that suggested that the most nuisance came from out of control stag parties and pub crawls of British and Dutch men. The campaign worked by displaying various videos warning British tourists who searched terms like "stag party Amsterdam", "cheap hotel Amsterdam" and "pub crawl Amsterdam" to stay away from the city at risk of being fined for nuisance or drug related offences. One of the videos displayed an intoxicated British male getting arrested on the streets by police and getting placed within the holding cell. Captions overlaying the video warned of a €140 fine, a criminal record, and poorer job prospects. The video ends with the statement "So coming to Amsterdam for a messy night? Stay away." Another video, specifically targeted towards tourists seeking drugs, showed a person ending up in the hospital from a drug overdose, reading "So coming for drugs to Amsterdam? Stay away."

In 2024, the video campaign widened to include tourists from the EU and the Netherlands. In addition, the campaign adopted a questionnaire that would pop up, asking prospective tourists questions about why they want to travel to Amsterdam, with answers ranging from cultural food to cocaine and MDMA. Depending on the answer, tourists could be warned about the consequences of such actions, as well as attempting to resolve misconceptions of Dutch drug policy.

=== Other efforts ===
Besides the advertising campaign, the government of Amsterdam additionally introduced several new laws and restrictions in order to discourage the sex and drug "nuisance" tourists. Due to already present controversy in addition to the anti-tourism effort, the Dutch government imposed stricter regulations on cannabis-selling coffeeshops. They also banned cannabis smoking in the streets of the Red Light District, as well as placed mandatory closing times on restaurants, bars, and brothels and blocking the sale of alcohol in the district after 4pm.

== Reception ==
Upon announcement of the advertising campaign, Stay Away drew widespread criticism. Critics regarded the targeted ads as discriminatory and based on false stereotypes, with some accusing the campaign of being xenophobic. They argued that Dutch men caused the same amounts of disruption to the locals and should also have been addressed. Other criticism came from hospitality and travel companies who saw the campaign as too negative, with a chief executive of a hotel chain saying that "you shouldn’t act like everyone who comes here for a wedding is a criminal!" Furthermore, some critics predicted that the entire campaign would be ineffective, predicting that the ads would, in fact, make Amsterdam more attractive to partying tourists seeking alcohol and drugs.

== Outcomes ==
While total tourist numbers to Amsterdam continued to rise, the city's council found a "light drop" in travelers from the UK,. Many residents reported that the amount of "nuisance" tourists decreased post-campaign.
