= Giard (surname) =

Giard is a surname. Notable people with the surname include:

- Alfred Mathieu Giard (1846–1908), French zoologist
- Harold W. Giard, Democratic member of the Vermont State Senate
- Jean Giard (1926–2026), French politician
- Joe Giard (1898–1956), American major league baseball player
- Luc Giard (1956–2026), Canadian cartoonist and artist
- Vincent Giard (born 1983), Canadian cartoonist and editor
