= Stayaway Skerries =

Stayaway Skerries (64°45′S 64°18′W) is a group of rocks and low-lying reefs awash, lying 1.5 nautical miles (2.8 km) south of Cape Monaco, off the southwest coast of Anvers Island in the Palmer Archipelago. Surveyed by the British Naval Hydrographic Survey Unit in 1956–57. So named by the United Kingdom Antarctic Place-Names Committee (UK-APC) as a caution to mariners; the group has patches of shoal water extending for some distance from it and should be given a wide berth.
