= Bonnier Point =

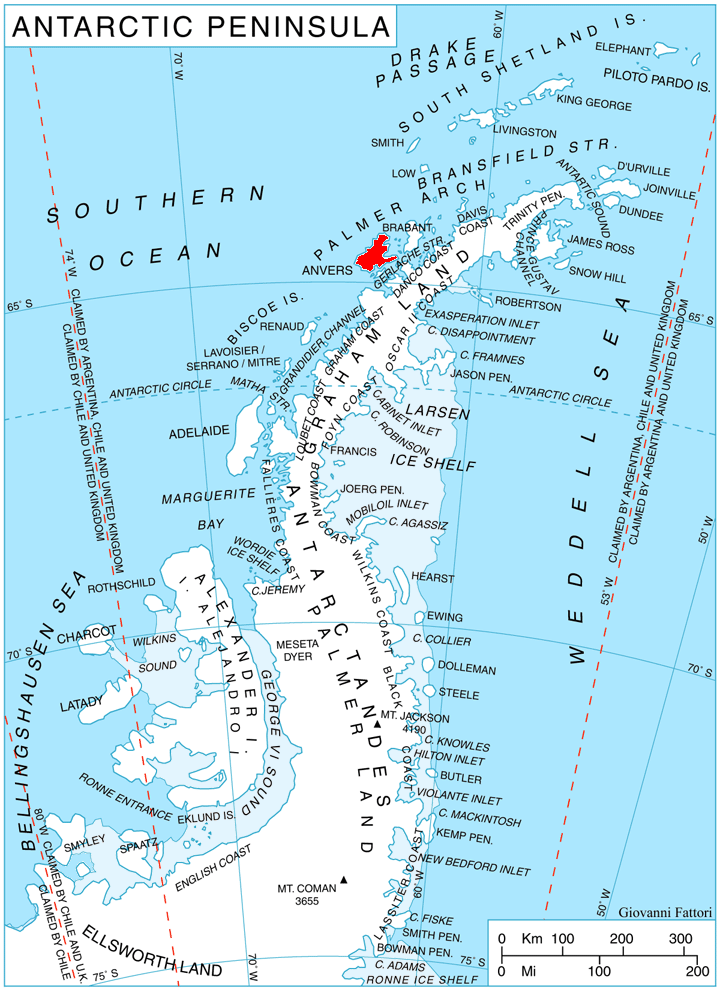
Location of Anvers Island in the Antarctic Peninsula region.

Bonnier Point (64°28′S 63°57′W) is a headland forming the west extremity of Obitel Peninsula and marking the north side of the entrance to Hamburg Bay, on the northwest coast of Anvers Island in the Palmer Archipelago, Antarctica. It was first charted by the French Antarctic Expedition, 1903–05, and named by Jean-Baptiste Charcot for Jules Bonnier, assistant director of the Laboratory of Maritime Zoology at Wimereux, who installed a laboratory on the ship Français.

== Maps ==
- British Antarctic Territory. Scale 1:200000 topographic map. DOS 610 Series, Sheet W 64 62. Directorate of Overseas Surveys, UK, 1980.
- Antarctic Digital Database (ADD). Scale 1:250000 topographic map of Antarctica. Scientific Committee on Antarctic Research (SCAR), 1993–2016.
