= Goten Peninsula =

Peninsula in the Palmer Archipelago, Antarctica

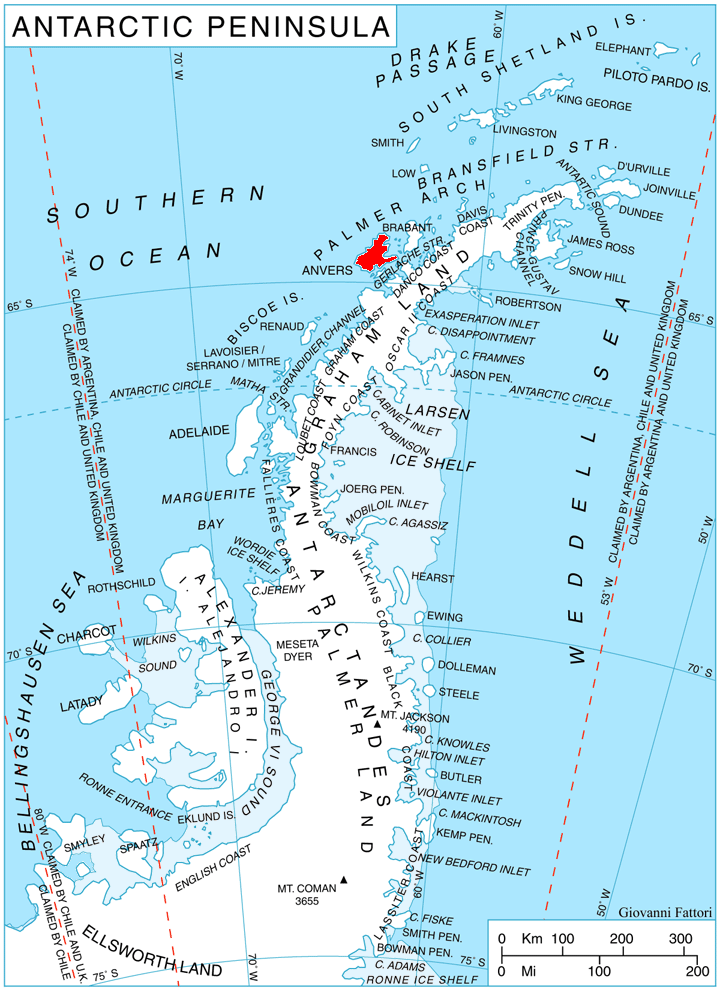
Location (in red) of Anvers Island in the Antarctic Peninsula region

Goten Peninsula (Bulgarian: полуостров Готен, romanized: poluostrov Goten, IPA: [poɫuˈɔstrov ɡoˈtɛn]) is the mostly ice-covered peninsula wide 5.35 km (3.32 mi) and indenting for 4.4 km (2.7 mi) northwestwards between Perrier Bay and Esquivel (Ricke) Bay on the northwest coast of Anvers Island in the Palmer Archipelago, Antarctica. It ends up in Quinton Point to the northwest.

The peninsula is named after Goten Peak in western Balkan Mountains, Bulgaria.

== Location ==
Goten Peninsula is centred at 64°20′20″S 63°37′40″W. British mapping in 1980.

== Maps ==
- British Antarctic Territory. Scale 1:200000 topographic map. DOS 610 Series, Sheet W 64 62. Directorate of Overseas Surveys, UK, 1980.
- Antarctic Digital Database (ADD). Scale 1:250000 topographic map of Antarctica. Scientific Committee on Antarctic Research (SCAR). Since 1993, regularly upgraded and updated.
