= Cape Monaco =

Cape in the Palmer Archipelago, Antarctica

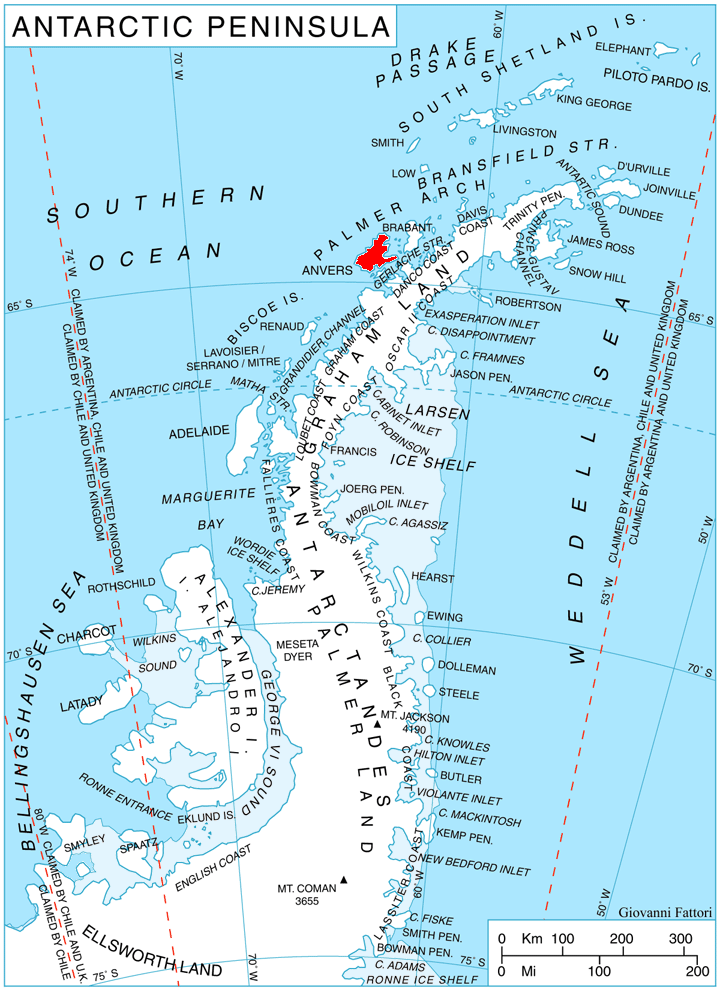
Location of Anvers Island in the Antarctic Peninsula region

Cape Monaco (64°43′S 64°18′W) is a cape which forms the southwest tip of Anvers Island, in the Palmer Archipelago, Antarctica. Gossler Islands and Chukovezer Island are lying respectively 3 km west and 7.2 km north of the cape.

Cape Monaco was discovered by a German expedition in 1873–1874, under Eduard Dallmann, but its relationship to Anvers Island was not known at that time. It was later charted by the Third French Antarctic Expedition, 1903–1905, under Jean-Baptiste Charcot, and named by him for Albert I, Prince of Monaco, a patron of the expedition.

== See also ==
- Skane Nunatak
- Stayaway Skerries
