= Joubin Islands =

Islands of Antarctica

Joubin Island
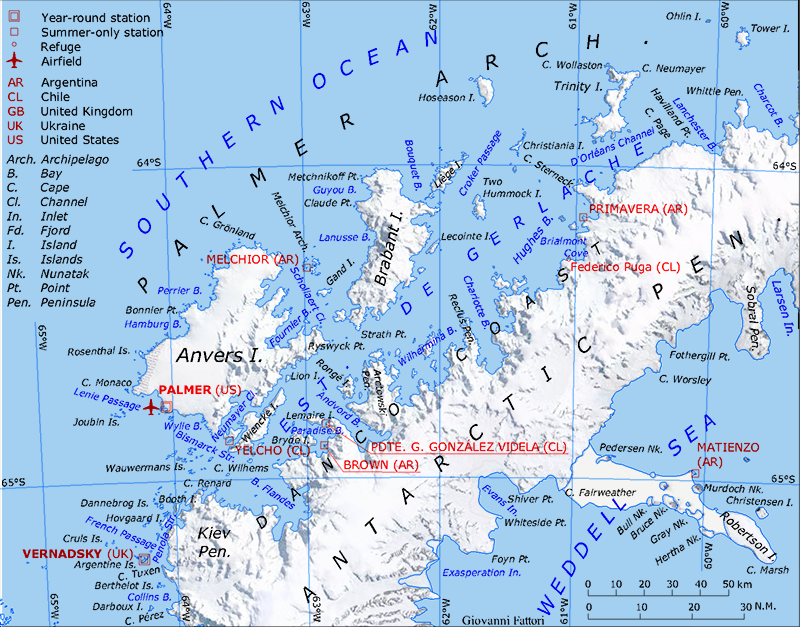
- Joubin Island is to the southwest of Anvers Island

- Location within Antarctica

Geography
- Location: Antarctica
- Coordinates: 64°47′S 64°27′W
- Archipelago: Palmer Archipelago

Administration
- Administered under the Antarctic Treaty System

Demographics
- Population: Uninhabited

The Joubin Islands are a group of small islands lying 6 kilometres (3 nmi) south-west of Cape Monaco, Anvers Island, at the south-western end of the Palmer Archipelago of Antarctica. The islands were discovered by the French Antarctic Expedition, 1903–05, under Jean-Baptiste Charcot, and named by him for Louis Joubin, the French naturalist. They have been designated a Restricted Zone under ASMA 7 — Southwest Anvers Island and Palmer Basin — which includes the marine area extending 50 metres (55 yd) from the shorelines.

== Environment ==
The islands share a volcanic and granitic geological origin with Anvers Island. Their vegetation, which is typical of the region, consists of a variety of mosses, lichens and algae, as well as the flowering plants Antarctic Hairgrass and Antarctic Pearlwort.

=== Important Bird Area ===
The islands have been identified as an Important Bird Area (IBA) by BirdLife International because they support a breeding colony of about 250 pairs of imperial shags. Other birds nesting on the islands include Adélie, gentoo and chinstrap penguins as well as southern giant petrels.

== See also ==
- List of Antarctic and subantarctic islands
