= Giard Point =

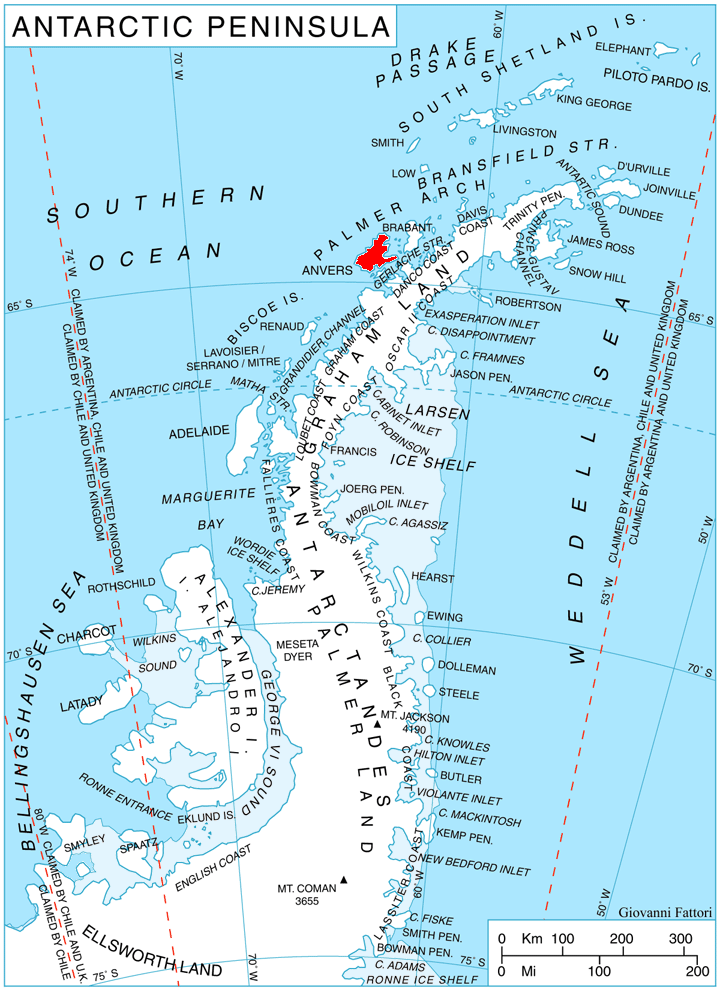
Location of Anvers Island in the Antarctic Peninsula region.

Giard Point (64°26′S 63°49′W) is a point forming the north extremity of Obitel Peninsula and the south side of the entrance to Perrier Bay, on the northwest coast of Anvers Island in the Palmer Archipelago, Antarctica. It was first charted by the French Antarctic Expedition, 1903–05, and named by Jean-Baptiste Charcot for Alfred Giard, a noted French zoologist and member of the Institut de France.

== Maps ==
- British Antarctic Territory. Scale 1:200000 topographic map. DOS 610 Series, Sheet W 64 62. Directorate of Overseas Surveys, UK, 1980.
- Antarctic Digital Database (ADD). Scale 1:250000 topographic map of Antarctica. Scientific Committee on Antarctic Research (SCAR), 1993–2016.
