= Quinton Point =

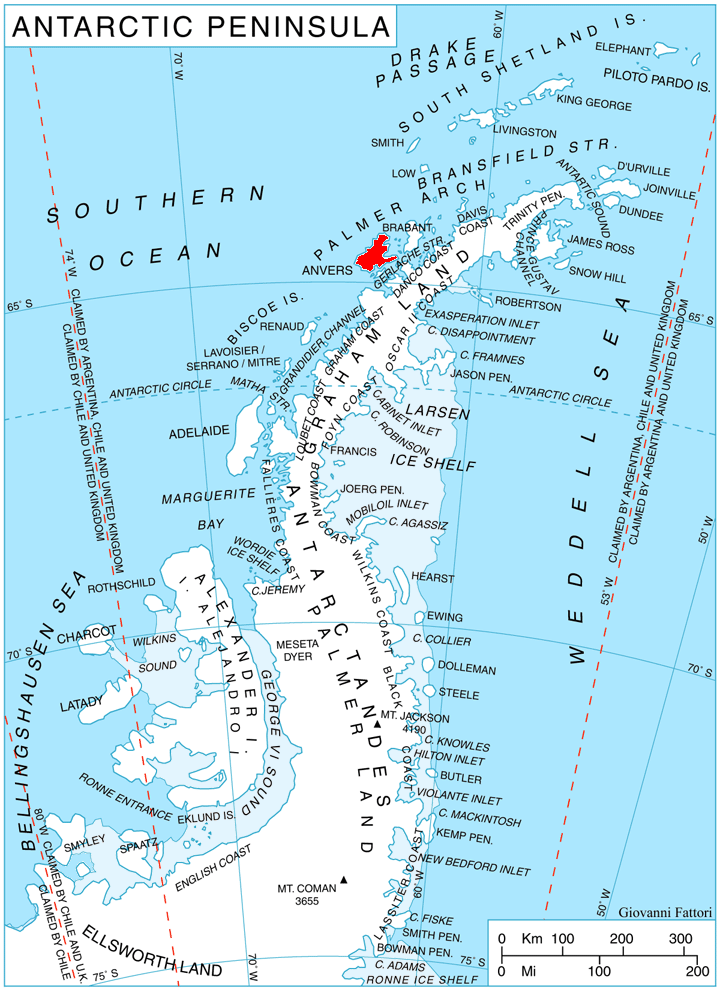
Location of Anvers Island in the Antarctic Peninsula region.

Quinton Point (64°19′S 63°41′W) is a point at the north side of the entrance to Perrier Bay, forming the northwest extremity of Goten Peninsula on the northwest coast of Anvers Island in the Palmer Archipelago of Antarctica. First charted by the French Antarctic Expedition, 1903–05, it was named by Charcot after Rene Quinton, French naturalist, then an assistant at the Laboratoire de Pathologie Physiologique, College de France.

== Maps ==
- British Antarctic Territory. Scale 1:200000 topographic map. DOS 610 Series, Sheet W 64 62. Directorate of Overseas Surveys, UK, 1980.
- Antarctic Digital Database (ADD). Scale 1:250000 topographic map of Antarctica. Scientific Committee on Antarctic Research (SCAR), 1993–2016.

== See also ==
- Access Point (Antarctica)
- Flag Point
