= Antarctic Specially Managed Area =

An Antarctic Specially Managed Area (ASMA) is a protected area on the continent of Antarctica, or on its adjacent islands. ASMAs are managed by the governments of Brazil, Poland, Ecuador, Peru, United States, New Zealand, Australia, Norway, Spain, United Kingdom, Chile, India, Russia, and Romania. The purpose of the ASMA sites are "to assist in the planning and coordination of activities within a specified area, avoid possible conflicts, improve cooperation between Antarctic Treaty Consultative Parties (ATCPs) and minimise environmental impacts. ASMAs may include areas where activities pose risks of mutual interference or cumulative environmental impacts, as well as sites or monuments of recognised historical value." Unlike the Antarctic Specially Protected Areas, ASMAs do not require a permit to enter.

== List of ASMAs ==
Number	Name	Description	Adopted	Coordinates	Estimated area	Image
ASMA-1	Admiralty Bay, King George Island	Admiralty Bay is an area of outstanding environmental, historical, scientific, and aesthetic values. It was first visited by sealers and whalers in the 19th and early 20th centuries, and relics from these periods still remain.	M 2 (2006)	62°01′21″S 58°15′05″W	409.54 km^{2} (158.12 sq mi)	Upload another image
ASMA-2	McMurdo Dry Valleys, Southern Victoria Land	The region incorporated by this ASMA is characterised as the largest relatively ice-free area in Antarctica, with approximately thirty percent of the ground surface largely free from snow and ice. It is an area of important scientific and wilderness values, with accumulated ice containing important records of past climate change, whilst the current climate serves as an important analogue for the conditions of ancient Earth and contemporary Mars. The Area contains unusual microhabitats and biological communities as well as special geological features and minerals. The Dry Valleys represent a nearly pristine environment largely undisturbed and uncontaminated by humans. The dramatic landscape, composed of high ridges and sweeping valleys and contrasts of ice-free and glacier-covered terrain, creates unique vistas with high aesthetic value. Activities conducted in the area include a variety of scientific research, operations in support of science, media, arts and education. The site's visitors include official national programme visitors as well as tourists. A Long Term Ecological Research site has also been established in the Taylor Valley.	M 1 (2004)	77°00′S 162°00′E	17,945.42 km^{2} (6,928.77 sq mi)	Upload another image See more images
ASMA-3	Cape Denison, Commonwealth Bay, George V Land, East Antarctica	Cape Denison is located in the centre of Commonwealth Bay, a 60 km-wide stretch of coast in George V Land. The Area is one of the principal sites of early human activity in Antarctica, and has considerable historical, cultural and scientific significance. It is the location of the base of the Australasian Antarctic Expedition of 1911-14 organised and led by Dr (later Sir) Douglas Mawson. An important symbol of the heroic age of Antarctic exploration, it is one of only six hut sites remaining from this period. Cape Denison hosted some of the earliest comprehensive studies of Antarctic geology, geography, terrestrial magnetism, astronomy, meteorology, glaciology, oceanography, biology, zoology and botany. It was also the base of numerous explorations inland and features artefacts associated with these sledging parties, including food caches and equipment. Cape Denison is not only the windiest place in Antarctica, but also the windiest place on Earth at sea level. The site thus provides the physical and symbolic context of the extreme isolation and harsh conditions endured by the expedition members and, by association, all other heroic age researchers and explorers.	M 1 (2004)	67°00′31″S 142°40′43″E	1.11 km^{2} (0.43 sq mi)	Upload another image See more images
ASMA-4	Deception Island	Deception Island, South Shetland Islands, has one of only two volcanoes in the Antarctic at which eruptions have been observed. Deception Island is a unique Antarctic island with important natural, scientific, historic, educational, aesthetic and wilderness values. It contains a restless caldera that is actively deforming and it is therefore likely that Deception Island will witness further eruptions in the future. The Area has an exceptionally important flora, including at least 18 species which have not been recorded elsewhere in the Antarctic. Of particular importance are the very small, unique biological communities associated with the island’s geothermal area. The island also has eight species of breeding seabirds including the world's largest colony of chinstrap penguins. The benthic habitat of Port Foster is of ecological interest due to the natural perturbations caused by volcanic activity.	M 3 (2005)	62°57′00″S 60°38′00″W	158.56 km^{2} (61.22 sq mi)	Upload another image See more images
ASMA-5	Amundsen-Scott South Pole Station, South Pole	The ASMA comprises an area of approximately 26.400 km 2 of the polar plateau, encompassing the Amundsen-Scott South Pole Station at 90°S as well as long-term research and monitoring sites. The area is located in a region of high scientific value due to many factors including its exceptionally clean air, isolation from sound, vibration, and electro-magnetic interference (EMI), geophysically stable location, unique ice conditions and the isolated population of Station inhabitants. The Area also has significant historical value, containing the Ceremonial Pole and Amundsen’s Tent. Activities conducted in the area include diverse scientific research endeavours with extensive international collaboration, operations in support of science, medicine, media, arts, education and tourism.	M 2 (2007)	90°00′S 0°00′E	26,286.03 km^{2} (10,149.09 sq mi)	Upload another image See more images
ASMA-6	Larsemann Hills, East Antarctica	The Area is an ice-free area of 40 km² which comprises also the near-shore islands, collectively known as the Larsemann Hills, and the adjacent plateau. The ice-free area consists of two major peninsulas (Stornes and Broknes), four minor peninsulas, and approximately 130 near shore islands. Substantial station-based research is undertaken on the site and tourists have visited the area on day trips. An increase in tourism Antarctica-wide has the potential over time to promote continued tourist visits to the Larsemann Hills, and the proposed establishment of a compacted snow airstrip near the site of the previous skiway may facilitate increased numbers of visits and visits of greater duration, including the potential for land-based (overnight) tourism. The initial period of intensive human activity between 1986 and 1989 and the subsequent conduct of science and support operations in the area have resulted in notable localised alteration of the environment, concentrated on eastern Broknes. The construction of station buildings, associated facilities and access routes on eastern Broknes has caused physical degradation of the ice-free surface. There is evidence of breakdown of rocks and exposure of the permafrost layer through repeated vehicle use which has caused surface erosion and altered drainage patterns. Chemical contamination of some lakes and soils has occurred through the accidental spillage of hydrocarbons and the disposal of wastewater on the ground surface. Several introduced floral species have also been detected.	M 2 (2007)	69°30′00″S 76°19′58″E	252.54 km^{2} (97.51 sq mi)	Upload another image
ASMA-7	Southwest Anvers Island and Palmer Basin	The region includes south-west Anvers Island and the Palmer Basin and its fringing island groups. This is an area of considerable and increasing scientific, tourist and logistic activities. In particular, scientific research being undertaken within the Area is important for considering ecosystem interactions and long-term environmental changes in the region, and how these relate to Antarctica and the global environment more generally. This research is important to the work of the Committee for Environmental Protection, the Commission for the Conservation of Antarctic Marine Living Resources (CCAMLR) and the Antarctic Treaty System as a whole. There is a risk that these globally important research programs and long-term datasets could be compromised if activities were to occur in the marine area that were not appropriately managed to avoid potential conflicts and possible interference.	M 1 (2008)	64°50′00″S 64°30′00″W	3,548.53 km^{2} (1,370.10 sq mi)	Upload another image

== See also ==
- Antarctic Specially Protected Area
