= Getman Ice Piedmont =

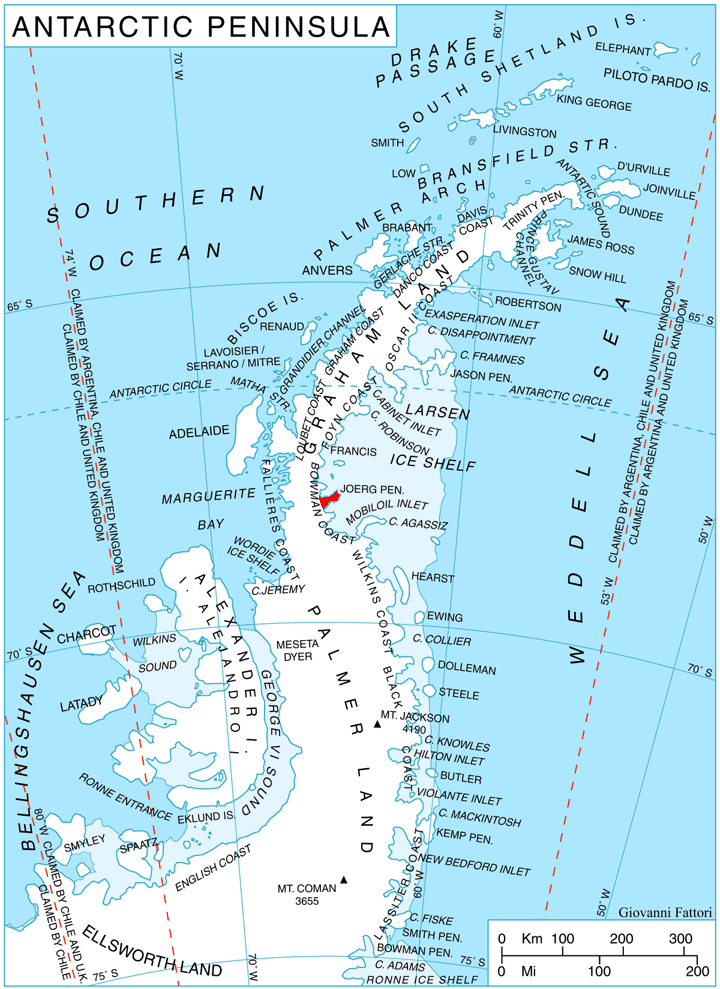
Location of Joerg Peninsula in Graham Land, Antarctic Peninsula.

Getman Ice Piedmont (68°6′S 64°57′W) is an ice piedmont between Reichle Mesa and Three Slice Nunatak at the east end of Joerg Peninsula, Bowman Coast, Antarctica. It drains north-northeastwards into Hondius Inlet. The feature was explored from the ground and photographed from the air by the United States Antarctic Service, 1939–41, the Ronne Antarctic Research Expedition, 1947–48, and was surveyed by the Falkland Islands Dependencies Survey, 1946–48. It was named by the Advisory Committee on Antarctic Names in 1977 for Commander Robert T. Getman of the United States Coast Guard, an Executive Officer on USCGC Southwind during U.S. Navy Operation Deep Freeze, 1969.
