= Curran Bluff =

Bluff in Graham Land, Antarctica

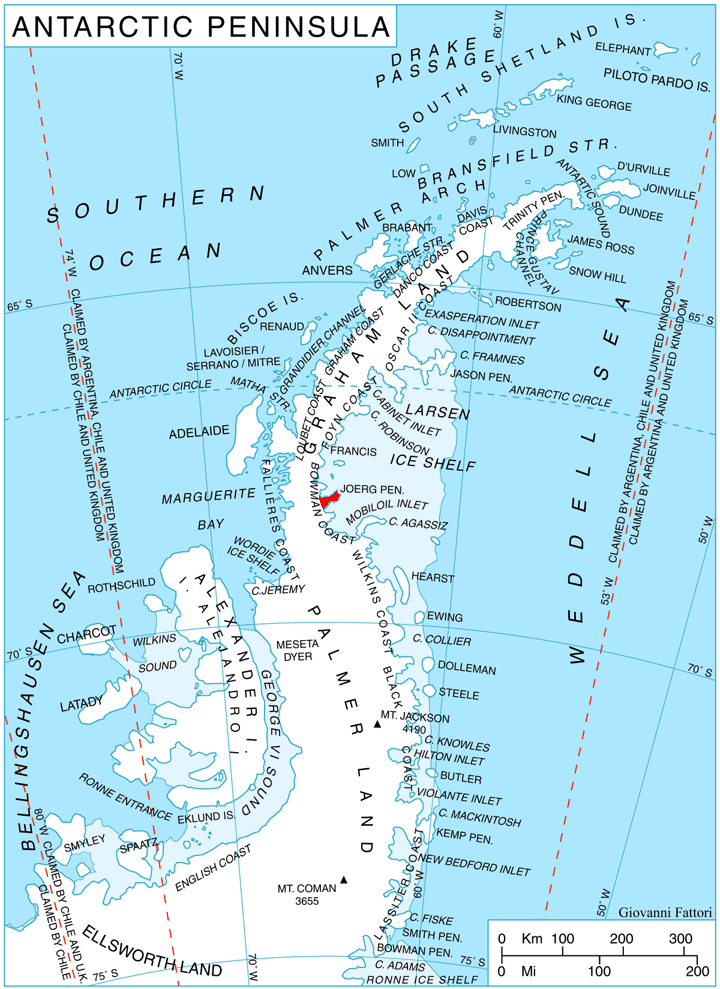
Location of Joerg Peninsula in Graham Land, Antarctic Peninsula.

Curran Bluff (68°13′S 65°2′W) is a bluff, 2 nautical miles (4 km) long, forming a part of the south coast of Joerg Peninsula, Bowman Coast, south of Reichle Mesa. The bluff rises to 910 metres (3,000 ft) at the west end and is the most prominent feature on the north side of Solberg Inlet. It was photographed from the air by Lincoln Ellsworth, 21 November 1935, and was mapped from these photographs by W.L.G. Joerg. It was named by the Advisory Committee on Antarctic Names for Martin P. Curran, a member of the Pine Island Bay reconnaissance survey in USCGC Burton Island, 1974–75, and Project Manager, RV Hero – Palmer Station Research System, 1976.
