= Villafranca =

Villafranca or Vilafranca may refer to:

== Places ==
- Vilafranca (medieval town), a type of trading center town in medieval times

=== Italy ===
- Villafranca d'Asti, in the province of Asti
- Villafranca di Verona, in the province of Verona
- Villafranca in Lunigiana, in the province of Massa-Carrara
- Villafranca Padovana, in the province of Padua
- Villafranca Piemonte, in the province of Turin
- Villafranca Sicula, in the province of Agrigento
- Villafranca Tirrena, in the province of Messina

=== Spain ===
- Vilafranca, in the autonomous community of Valencia
- Vilafranca de Bonany, in the autonomous community of Balearic Islands
- Vilafranca del Penedès, in the autonomous community of Catalunya
- Villafranca, Navarre, in the autonomous community of Navarre
- Villafranca de Córdoba, in the autonomous community of Andalusia
- Villafranca de Duero, in the autonomous community of Castile and León
- Villafranca de Ebro, in the autonomous community of Aragon
- Villafranca de la Sierra, in the autonomous community of Castile and León
- Villafranca de los Barros, in the autonomous community of Extremadura
- Villafranca de los Caballeros, in the autonomous community of Castile-La Mancha
- Villafranca del Bierzo, in the autonomous community of Castile and León
- Villafranca del Campo, in the autonomous community of Aragon
- Villafranca de Ordicia, currently officially named Ordizia, in the autonomous community of Basque Country
- Villafranca Montes de Oca, in the autonomous community of Castile and León

=== Paraguay ===
- Villa Franca, a village in the Ñeembucú department of Paraguay

=== Portugal ===
- Vila Franca de Xira, Lisbon
- Vila Franca do Campo, Azores

=== France ===
- Villefranche-sur-Mer (Villafranca in Occitan and Italian), a city in the Provence-Alpes-Côte d'Azur region, one of the principal ports of the (Italian-speaking) Duchy of Savoy before 1860

== People ==
- Villafranca (surname)
- Counts of Villafranca

== Other uses ==
- Villafranca (film), a 1934 Italian historical drama film
- Treaty of Villafranca (1866), Seven Weeks' War

== See also ==
- Villefranche (disambiguation)
- Francavilla (disambiguation)
- Freiburg
- Franca (disambiguation)
- Villa (disambiguation)
- Vila (disambiguation)
