= Hondius Inlet =

Ice-filled inlet

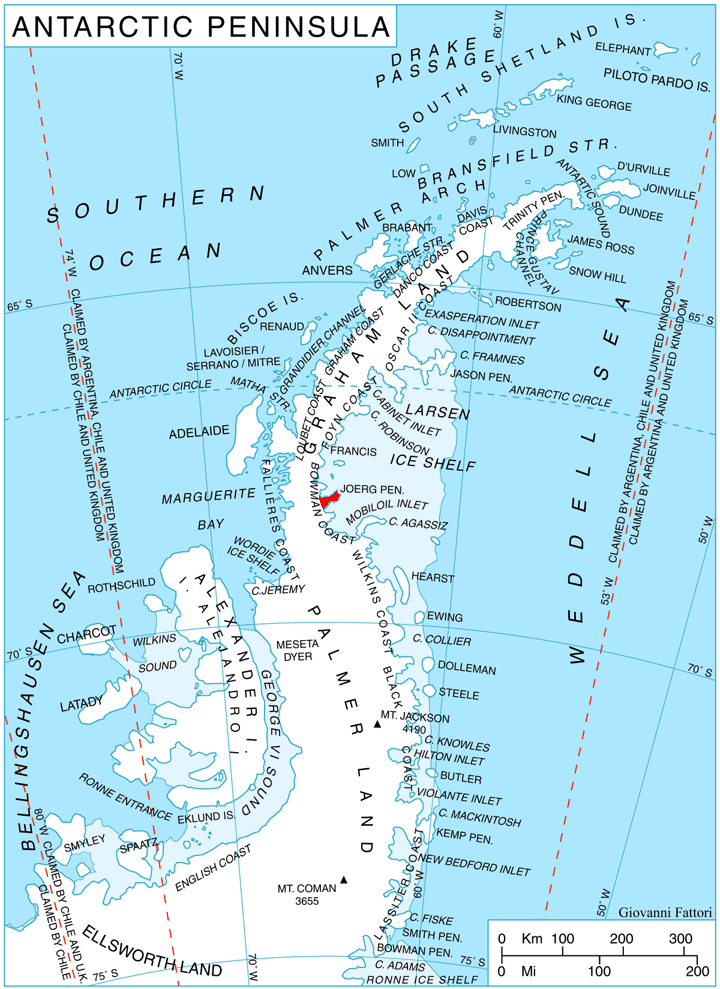
Location of Joerg Peninsula in Graham Land, Antarctic Peninsula.

Hondius Inlet is a 5.7 km wide, ice-filled inlet that indents the tip of Joerg Peninsula on the Bowman Coast of the Antarctic Peninsula, extending 6.7 km southeast of Three Slice Nunatak. Its head is fed by the Getman Ice Piedmont.

The geographic feature is named after the Flemish cartographer Jodocus Hondius (1563–1612), whose map in 1595 depicted the southern continent Terra Australis as separate from Tierra del Fuego and New Guinea.

== Location ==
The Hondius Inlet is centred at 68°04′50″S 64°55′00″W. British mapping in 1963 and 1976.

== Maps ==
- British Antarctic Territory. Scale 1:200,000 topographic map. DOS 610 Series, Sheet W 68 64. Directorate of Overseas Surveys, Tolworth, UK, 1963.
- British Antarctic Territory: Palmer Land. Scale 1:250,000 topographic map. BAS 250 Series, Sheet SR 19–20. London, 1976.
- Antarctic Digital Database (ADD). Scale 1:250,000 topographic map of Antarctica. Scientific Committee on Antarctic Research (SCAR). Since 1993, regularly upgraded and updated.
