= Reichle Mesa =

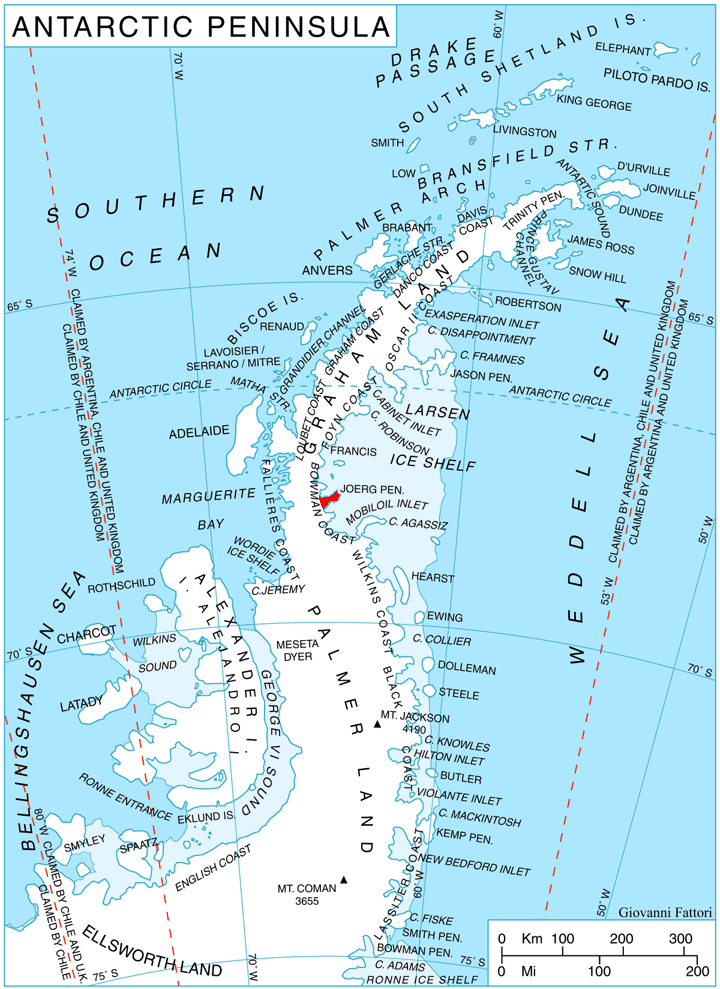
Location of Joerg Peninsula in Graham Land, Antarctic Peninsula.

Reichle Mesa (68°9′S 65°3′W) is an ice-covered tableland, 3 nautical miles (6 km) in extent and rising to 1,160 m, between Stubbs Pass and Getman Ice Piedmont on Joerg Peninsula, Bowman Coast. The feature was photographed from the air by the United States Antarctic Service (USAS), 1940, Ronne Antarctic Research Expedition (RARE), 1947, and U.S. Navy, 1966, and was surveyed by Falkland Islands Dependencies Survey (FIDS), 1946–48. Named by Advisory Committee on Antarctic Names (US-ACAN) in 1977 after Richard A. Reichle, United States Antarctic Research Program (USARP) biologist, specialist on Antarctic seals in six austral summers, 1970–77, the last two summers in RV Islands.
