= Franca (disambiguation) =

Franca is a municipality in Brazil.

Franca or França may also refer to:

== People ==
- França (surname), a list of people with the Portuguese language surname
- Franca (given name), a list of people
- França (footballer, born 1976), Brazilian football striker Françoaldo Sena de Souza
- França (footballer, born 1991), Brazilian defensive midfielder Welington Wildy Muniz dos Santos
- França (footballer, born 1995), Brazilian forward Carlos Henrique França Freires
- França Júnior, a Brazilian playwright and journalist

== Places ==
- Franca Airport, Franca, Brazil
- Roman Catholic Diocese of Franca, Franca, Ribeirão Preto, Brazil
- França (Bragança), Bragança, Terras de Trás-os-Montes, Portugal
- Barcelona França railway station (Franca station, France station), Barcelona, Catalonia, Spain
- Zona Franca – Port, Barcelona, Catalonia, Spain
- Franca Glacier, Solber Inlet, Bowman Coast, Antarctica

== Other uses ==
- Franca, a genus of plants now included in Frankenia
- Franca: Chaos and Creation, a 2016 documentary film
- Franca IDL (interface definition language), part of the Franca framework, a framework for definition and transformation of software interfaces
- MV Franca C, an oceanliner

== See also ==
- lingua franca
- France (disambiguation)
- Franco
- Franc (disambiguation)
- France (disambiguation)
- Francia (disambiguation)
- Lingua franca (disambiguation)
- Villafranca (disambiguation), including Vila Franca, Villa Franca, Vilafranca, (many meaning Franca Village)
