= Lafrance =

Lafrance, LaFrance, la France and other variations may refer to:

== Places ==
- France, a country in Europe (la France in French)
- La France, South Carolina, United States, an unincorporated community and census-designated place
- Maison Lafrance, New Brunswick, Canada, a residence at the University of Moncton
- LaFrance Hotel, Delrey Beach, Florida, United States

== People ==
- Adélard Lafrance (1912–1995), Canadian ice hockey player
- Adrienne LaFrance, American journalist and editor
- Émilien Lafrance (1911–1977), Canadian politician
- Jules-Isidore Lafrance (1841–1881), French sculptor
- George LaFrance (born 1965), American arena football player
- Helen LaFrance (1919–2020), American artist
- Joseph La France (1707–1745), Metis fur trader
- Kienan LaFrance (born 1991), Canadian football player
- Kevin Lafrance (born 1990), French-Haitian footballer
- Leo Lafrance (1902–1993), Canadian ice hockey player
- Marcel LaFrance (1940–2022), Canadian racing driver
- Noémie Lafrance (born 1973), Canadian choreographer
- Paul Lafrance (born 1974), Canadian TV personality and builder
- Yvon Lafrance (born 1944), Canadian politician

== Other uses ==
- La France (airship), launched in 1884
- GWR 102 La France, a locomotive
- Rosa 'La France', an hybrid tea rose developed in 1867
- La France (French newspaper)
- La France (film), a 2007 French film
- La France (song), a 2001 song by Sniper
- "La France", a single by the Dutch pop group BZN
- LaFrance v. Cline, a 2020 Nevada Supreme Court decision

== See also ==
- American LaFrance, an American vehicle manufacturer
- LaFrance-Republic, a truck manufacturing company established in 1929 from the merger of American LaFrance and the Republic Motor Truck Company
- Ward LaFrance Truck Corporation
- Pont-Lafrance, New Brunswick, Canada, a former municipality
- Pointe LaFrance, New Brunswick, an unincorporated place
- France (disambiguation)
