= France (name) =

France is a unisex given name and an English, French, and Slovene surname. In French-speaking countries, France may be a woman's first name. In France, it may derive from an ethnic name for an inhabitant of the country; a variant is Lafrance. In Slovenia, France may derive from the personal name "France", a vernacular form of "Frančišek", Latin Franciscus ("Francis"). It may also be an Americanized spelling of the German given or surname "Franz".

== Given name ==
=== Men ===
- France Adamič (1911–2014), Slovene agronomist
- France Ahčin (1919–1989), Slovene sculptor
- France Ačko (1904–1974), Slovene musician, organist and composer
- France Balantič (1921–1943), Slovene poet
- France Bevk (1890–1970), Slovene writer, poet and translator
- France Bučar (1923–2015), Slovene politician, legal expert and author
- France Cukjati (born 1943), Slovene politician, physician and theologist
- France Dejak (1925–2003), Slovene soldier and Kočevski Rog massacre survivor
- France Laux (1897–1978), American sports announcer
- France Prešeren (1800–1849), Slovene romantic poet
- France Rode (1934–2017), Slovenian engineer and inventor
- France Staub (1920–2005), Mauritian ornithologist, herpetologist and botanist
- France Štiglic (1919–1993), Slovene film director and screenwriter
- France Vodnik (1903–1986), Slovene writer and poet

=== Women ===
- France A. Córdova (born 1947), American astrophysicist and administrator
- France D'Amour (born 1967), French-Canadian singer and songwriter
- France Gall (1947–2018), French pop singer
- France Gélinas, Canadian politician
- France Joli (born 1963), Canadian singer and songwriter
- France Nuyen (born 1939), French-Vietnamese actress now psychological counselor
- France Quéré (1936–1995), French Protestant theologian, writer
- France Castel (born 1944), French-Canadian signer, actress
- France Beaudoin (born 1969), French-Canadian journalist, TV show host

== Surname ==
- Alfred E. France (1927–2015), American politician
- Ali France (born 1973), Australian politician
- Bill France Sr. (1909–1992), co-founder, CEO, and chairman of NASCAR
- Bill France Jr. (1933–2007), CEO of NASCAR and chairman of ISC
- Brian France (born 1962), former CEO and chairman of NASCAR
- C. V. France (1868–1949), British actor
- Cécile de France (born 1975), Belgian actress
- Ellen France (born 1956), New Zealand judge
- Eurilda Loomis France (1865–1931), American painter
- Jim France (born 1944), CEO and chairman of NASCAR, executive vice president of NASCAR, and CEO and chairman of ISC
- J. P. France (born 1995), American professional baseball player
- Michael France (1962–2013), American screenwriter
- Pierre Mendès France (1907–1982), French prime minister
- R. T. France (1938–2012), New Testament scholar and Anglican cleric
- Raoul Heinrich Francé (1874–1943), Austro-Hungarian botanist, microbiologist, and philosopher
- Robbie France (1959–2012), English drummer, record producer, arranger, journalist, music educator, and broadcaster
- Ryan France (born 1980), English former footballer
- Shirley May France (1932–2012), American swimmer
- Ty France (born 1994), American professional baseball player

== See also ==
- Kai Kara-France (born 1993), New Zealand mixed martial artist
- Lafrance, a surname
