= Stade de France (disambiguation) =

Stade de France is a stadium in Saint-Denis, Seine-Saint-Denis, Ile-de-France, France

Stade de France may also refer to:

- Gare de La Plaine-Stade de France, a rail station on the RER B rail line, in Saint-Denis, Seine-Saint-Denis, Ile-de-France, France
- Stade de France – Saint-Denis (Paris RER), a rail station on the RER D rail line, in Saint-Denis, Seine-Saint-Denis, Ile-de-France, France
- Stade de France (DVD), a concert DVD filmed at the Stade de France from the N°5 on Tour of Mylène Farmer
- Stade de France suicide bombings, a series of bombings by Da'esh, occurring on Friday 13 November 2015, part of the November 2015 Paris attacks

== See also ==
- France (disambiguation)
- Stade Français
- Category:Sports venues in France
