= França (surname) =

França (Portuguese pronunciation: [ˈfɾɐ̃sɐ] — France in the Portuguese language) is a Portuguese surname. Notable people with the surname include:

- António França (born 1938), Angolan footballer and politician
- Carlos França (born 1980), Brazilian footballer
- Felipe França Silva (born 1987), Brazilian swimmer
- Ivan Carlos França Coelho (born 1989), Brazilian footballer
- Jymmy França (born 1984), Brazilian footballer
- Lohanna França (born 1995), Brazilian politician
- Lucas França (born 1996), Brazilian footballer
- Márcio França (born 1963), Brazilian politician
- Ricardo França (born 1991), Brazilian politician

== See also ==
- Franca (disambiguation)
