= Villafranca (surname) =

Villafranca is a habitational surname of Spanish and Italian origin.

== Notable people ==
Notable people with this surname include:

- Fernando Villafranca (born 1993), Mexican boxer
- Juan de Villafranca (born 1954), Mexican diplomat
- Soledad Villafranca (1880–1948), Spanish anarchist
- Vincent Villafranca (born 1969), American sculptor

== See also ==
- Villafranca (disambiguation)
