= Villefranche =

Villefranche may refer to:

== Places in France ==
=== Auvergne-Rhône-Alpes ===
- Villefranche-d'Allier, Allier department
- Villefranche-le-Château, Drôme department
- Villefranche-sur-Saône, Rhône department

=== Bourgogne-Franche-Comté ===
- Villefranche, Yonne, Yonne department

=== Centre-Val de Loire ===
- Villefranche-sur-Cher, Loir-et-Cher department

=== Grand Est ===
- Villefranche, former municipality, now part of Saulmory-et-Villefranche, Meuse department

=== Nouvelle-Aquitaine ===
- Villefranche-de-Lonchat, Dordogne department
- Villefranche-du-Périgord, Dordogne department
- Villefranche-du-Queyran, Lot-et-Garonne department

=== Occitania ===
- Villefranche-d'Astarac, Gers department
- Villefranche-d'Albigeois, Tarn department
- Villefranche-de-Conflent, Pyrénées-Orientales department
- Villefranche-de-Lauragais, Haute-Garonne department
- Villefranche-de-Panat, Aveyron department
- Villefranche-de-Rouergue, Aveyron department

=== Provence-Alpes-Côte d'Azur ===
- Villefranche-sur-Mer, Alpes-Maritimes department

== Places in Italy ==
- a village in Quart, Aosta Valley

== Other uses ==
- Jacques-Melchior Villefranche (1829–1904), French Catholic publicist
- Villefranche XIII Aveyron, semi-professional rugby league football club from Villefranche-de-Rouergue
- Villefranche – Tarare Airport (IATA: XVF), the airport of Villefranche-sur-Saône

== See also ==
- Villafranca (disambiguation)
- Vilafranca (medieval town)
