= Pylon Point =

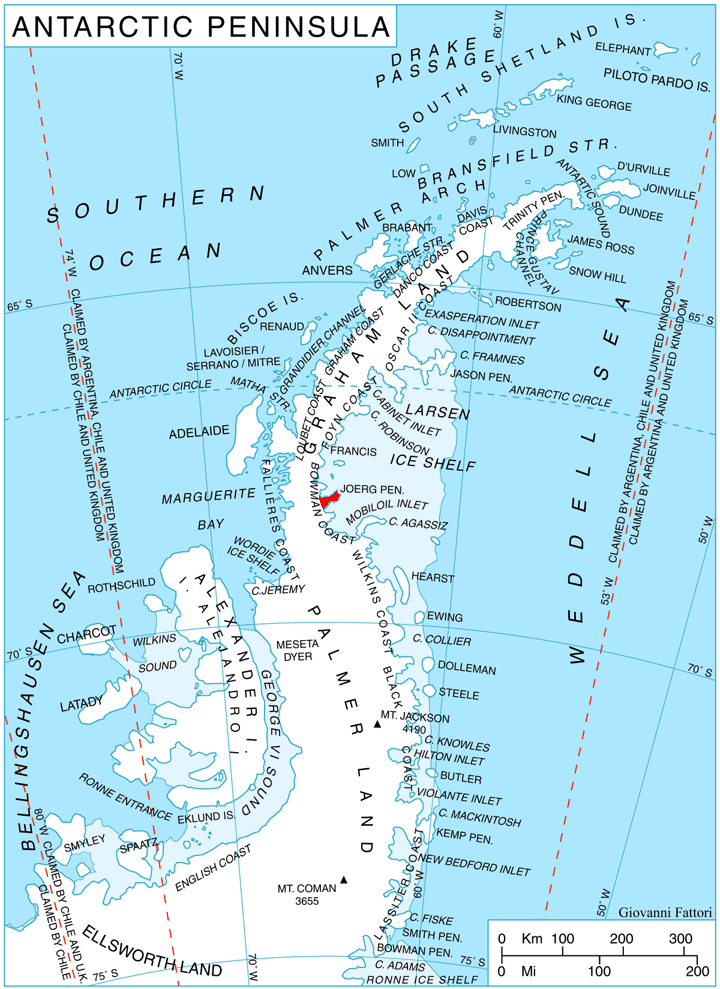
Location of Joerg Peninsula in Graham Land, Antarctic Peninsula.

Pylon Point (68°6′S 65°5′W) is a rocky promontory standing 4 nautical miles (7 km) southwest of Three Slice Nunatak and marking the north end of the main mountainous mass of Joerg Peninsula, on the east coast of Graham Land. Pylon Point lies in the area first seen by Sir Hubert Wilkins on his flight of 20 December 1928, and crossed by Lincoln Ellsworth on his flight of 21 November 1935. So named by the US-SCAN because the various flights and sledge trips of the United States Antarctic Service (USAS), 1939–41, rounded it on their way south along the east coast of Antarctic Peninsula.
