= Ahčin =

Ahčin is a surname. Notable people with the surname include:

- Ivan Ahčin (1897–1960), Slovene sociologist
- Marjan Ahčin (1903–1988), Slovene partisan
- France Ahčin (1919–1989), Slovene sculptor
- Nemanja Ahčin (born 1994), Serbian footballer
