= Houser Peak =

Mountain in Antarctica

Houser Peak (68°22′S 65°33′W) is a peak, 1,080 metres (3,540 ft) high, between Tofani Glacier and Franca Glacier at the head of Solberg Inlet, Bowman Coast, Antarctica. The peak was photographed from the air by the United States Antarctic Service, 1940, the U.S. Navy, 1966, and was surveyed by the Falkland Islands Dependencies Survey, 1946–48. It was named by the Advisory Committee on Antarctic Names in 1977 for Elaine Houser, an administrative officer with Holmes and Narver, Inc., which from the 1968–69 season through 1979–80, provided engineering, construction, and general support services to United States Antarctic Research Program stations in Antarctica.
