= Corse (ship) =

19th century sea vessel

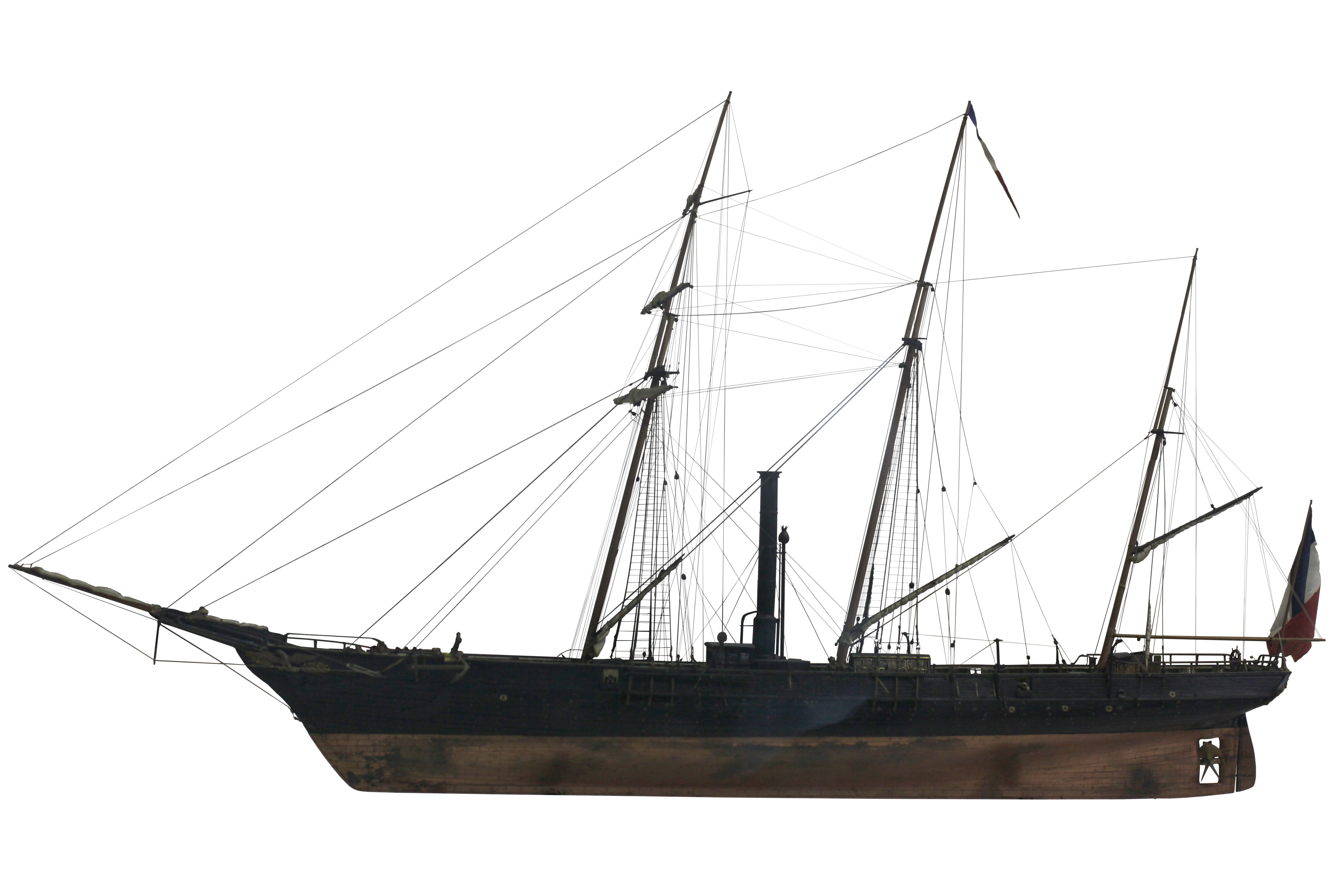
- Scale model of the steam schooner Napoléon, later Corse, on display at the Musée national de la Marine in Paris

History

France
- Name: 1842–1850: Napoléon; 1850–1902: Corse
- Namesake: Napoléon I of France; Corsica
- Builder: Chantiers Augustin Normand, Le Havre
- Laid down: 1842
- Launched: 6 December 1842; 183 years ago
- Commissioned: 1843
- Recommissioned: 1850: purchased by Navy
- Stricken: 31 December 1890
- Fate: 1902: broken up

General characteristics
- Displacement: 376 tonnes
- Length: 47 m (154.2 ft)
- Beam: 8.5 m (27.9 ft)
- Draught: 3.6 m (11.8 ft)
- Propulsion: Sail and 120 hp (89 kW) Barnes steam engine
- Sail plan: Schooner
- Speed: 10 knots (19 km/h; 12 mph)
- Armament: 2 to 4 guns

Corse, initially named Napoléon before its second commission, was a sail and steam experimental schooner, initially commissioned as a mail steamer. Largely overperforming her specifications and an excellent sailor, she was purchased by the Navy and commissioned to serve as an aviso, becoming the first propeller ship in service in the French Navy. She took part in the Crimean War and ferried Prince Napoléon to Iceland in 1856. She was eventually broken up in 1902.

== Career ==
Napoléon was designed as a mail steamer, one of the first in France to use propellers. She was a joint venture by engineer Frédéric Sauvage, one of the inventors of the screw propeller, and shipbuilder Augustin Normand, who provided the shipbuilding facilities and insisted for a propeller with several blades. As the Navy was initially uninterested in a steam and sail propeller ship, Normand protested to the Ministry of Finance, who agreed to commission Napoléon as a mail steamer under the condition that she would reach a speed of 8 knots (15 km/h; 9.2 mph); during her trials, Napoléon maintained an average speed or 9.7 knots (18.0 km/h; 11.2 mph) and reached 12 knots (22 km/h; 14 mph), largely exceeding ministerial specifications.

Napoléon was used as a postal shuttle between Marseille and Ajaccio between 1842 and 1850.

In November 1850, she was purchased by the Navy, renamed Corse on 28 December, and commissioned as an aviso in Toulon in January 1851, becoming the first screw-propelled unit commissioned in the French Navy. She departed Toulon on 30 January 1850 for her new station in Brest, which she reached on 17 February. She served in the Littoral English Channel naval division, towing Basilic from Le Havre to Cherbourg on 26 April 1852, and Serpent two days later.

In 1854, Corse took part in the Crimean War as a troopship. Two years later, she ferried Prince Napoléon to Iceland.

In 1863, Corse was transferred from the channel to the Mediterranean and affected to the training squadron. In 1873 she was transferred to the Bosporus naval station, and from 1879 was part of the Mediterranean squadron.

Corse was struck on 31 December 1890 and used as a coal store hulk, before being broken up in 1902.

== Sources ==
- "1842. Le Corse, aviso à hélice (France)". L'histoire de la Marine de 1700 à 1850 (in French). Archived from the original on 4 March 2016.
- "Les bâtiments ayant porté le nom de Corse". Net-Marine (in French).
- Roche, Jean-Michel (2005). Dictionnaire des bâtiments de la flotte de guerre française de Colbert à nos jours [Dictionary of French Warships from Colbert to Today] (in French). Vol. 1. Group Retozel-Maury Millau. p. 322. ISBN 978-2-9525917-0-6. OCLC 165892922.
