= Stubbs Pass =

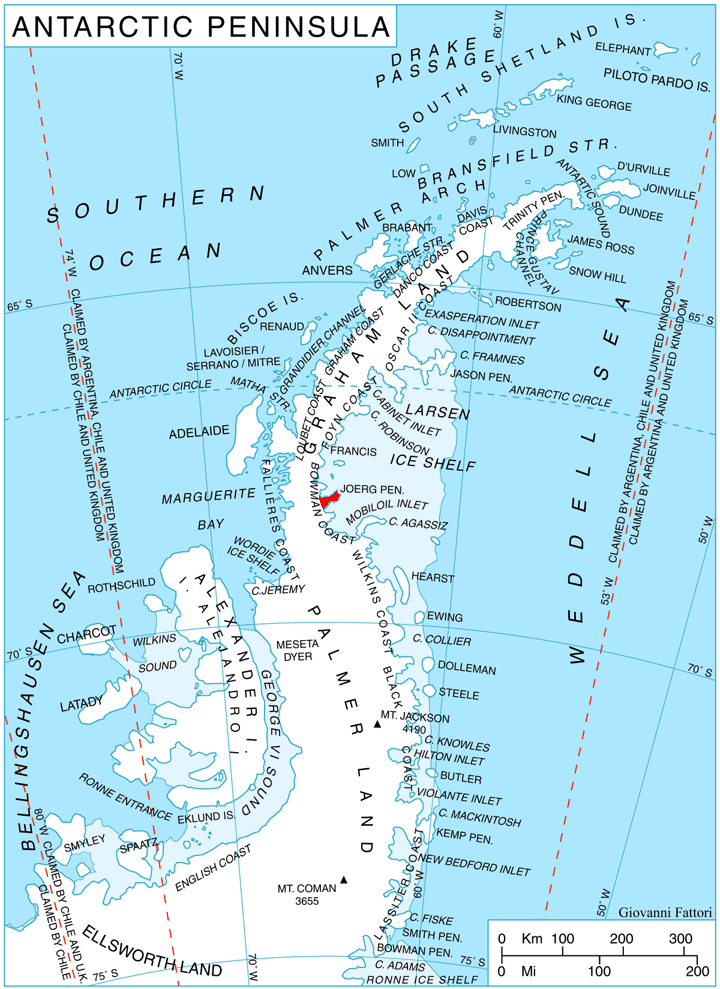
Location of Joerg Peninsula in Graham Land, Antarctic Peninsula.

Stubbs Pass (68°11′S 65°12′W) is a north–south pass through the middle of Joerg Peninsula on the east side of Graham Land.

The pass was photographed from aircraft by the United States Antarctic Service (USAS), 1939–41, and the Ronne Antarctic Research Expedition (RARE), 1947–48. It was traveled by R.L. Freeman of Falkland Islands Dependencies Survey (FIDS) in 1947–48. Named by United Kingdom Antarctic Place-Names Committee (UK-APC) for Guy M. Stubbs, British Antarctic Survey (BAS) geologist at Stonington Island, 1963–65.
