= Francavilla Calcio =

Francavilla Calcio may refer to 3 Italian football clubs:

- A.S.D. Francavilla, based in Francavilla al Mare (CH), Abruzzo
- F.C. Francavilla, based in Francavilla in Sinni (PZ), Basilicata
- Virtus Francavilla Calcio, based in Francavilla Fontana (BR), Apulia

== See also ==
- Francavilla (disambiguation)
