= France (disambiguation) =

France is a country in western Europe.

France may also refer to:

== People ==
- France (name), including a list of people with the given name or surname
- Anatole France, pen name of French writer François-Anatole Thibault (1844–1924)
- France family, an American motorsports family in NASCAR

== States ==
- Kingdom of France (987–1792, 1814–1815, 1815–1848)
- French Empire (disambiguation)
- French Republics (disambiguation)

== Film and television ==
- France Télévisions, a national public television broadcaster
  - France 2, a television channel
  - France 3, a television channel
  - France 4, a television channel
  - France 5, a television channel
  - France Ô, a former television channel featuring programming from France's overseas departments and territories
  - France Info (TV channel), a national news channel
- France 24, an international multilingual news channel
- France (film), 2021 comedy-drama film
- "France", a Series F episode of the television series QI (2009)

== Radio ==
- Radio France, a national public radio broadcaster
- Radio France Internationale, an international public radio broadcaster

== Ships ==
- French battleship France, which served in World War I
- SS France (1910), an ocean liner
- SS France (1960), an ocean liner, later renamed the SS Norway
- France II, a sailing ship

== Other uses ==
- France River, a tributary of Chibougamau Lake in Quebec, Canada
- France national football team
- Argentine station, a Paris Metro station temporarily renamed France on 18 December 2022, ahead of 2022 World Cup final, played by France and Argentina
- France (album)

== See also ==
- French (disambiguation)
- Lafrance (disambiguation)
- Francia or the Kingdom of the Franks (481–843)
- França (disambiguation)
- Franco (disambiguation)
- Franke
