= Jules-Isidore Lafrance =

French sculptor

- Born: 15 December 1841; Paris, France
- Died: 26 January 1881 (aged 39); Paris, France
- Resting place: Passy Cemetery
- Education: École nationale supérieure des Beaux-Arts

Jules-Isidore Lafrance (15 December 1841 – 26 January 1881) was a French sculptor.

== Biography ==
Lafrance was born in Paris on 15 December 1941. A graduate of the École nationale supérieure des Beaux-Arts, he was a student of Francisque Duret, Jules Cavelier and Auguste Maillard.

Lafrance made his debut at the Salon de la Société des artistes français in 1860. He won the first grand prix de Rome in 1870 and stayed at the Villa Medici between 1871 and 1874. On his return to France, he won the gold medal of the Salon in 1874, before obtaining the gold medal at the Exposition Universelle (1878) in Paris. He was named chevalier of the Legion of Honour on 20 October 1878. Part of his works were published by the Susse Frères.

Lafrance died on 26 January 1881 in the 7th arrondissement of Paris. His funeral took place two days later at Montmartre Cemetery and his body was transported to Passy Cemetery on 2 September, where he is buried with his parents, in the 4th division, 1st line East, 9 North.

== Works ==
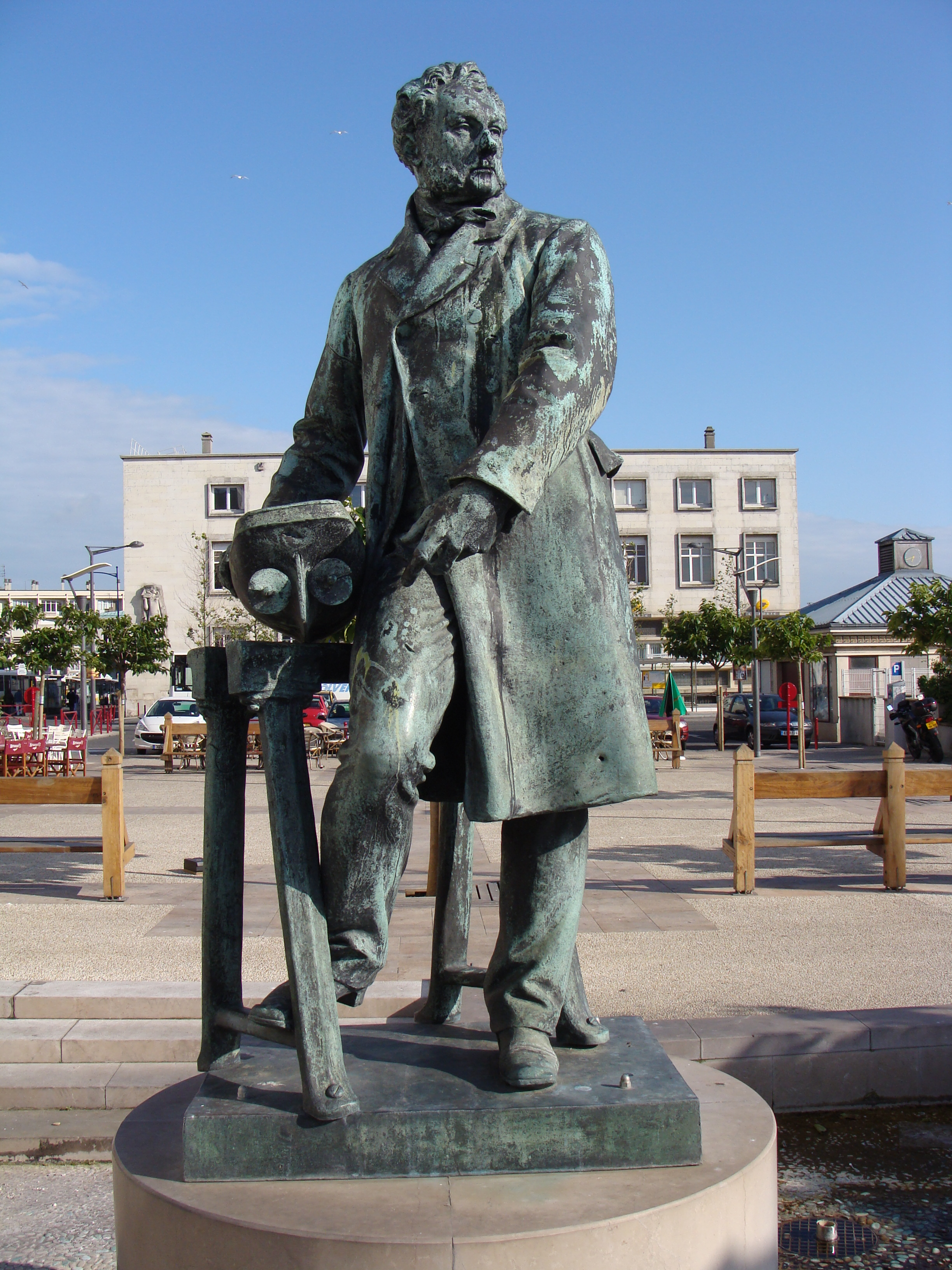
Monument à Frédéric Sauvage (1881, detail), Boulogne-sur-Mer, place Sauvage.

- Samson rompant ses liens: created in 1870, this plaster won the first prix de Rome. Owned by the state, it is kept at the École nationale supérieure des beaux-arts in Paris.
- Saint-Jean Baptiste enfant : the artist sent a plaster model of this during his stay at the Villa Médicis in Rome, in 1873. Acquired by the state in 1874, it was exhibited at the Exposition Universelle (1878), and was sent to the Museum of Fine Arts, Reims. A bronze, created by Martin foundries and exhibited at the Salon in 1876, is kept at the lace museum in Alençon. A marble statue, (h. 149 cm), dated to 1878, is kept in Paris at the Musée d'Orsay.
- Saint Jean prêchant dans le désert : plaster statue dated 1874, kept at the museum in Reims; the same model, in bronze, created by the Susse company, is kept at the museum in Alençon.
- Monument à Frédéric Sauvage : in 1864, the municipality of Boulogne-sur-Mer designed to erect a monument in memory of the Bologne inventor. The Ministry of Fine Art, in an announcement of 24 March 1877, charged Lafrance with executing the model of the statue, and accepted the proposition which the artist presented to the Salon in 1880. The committee proposed on 12 August 1880, to create three bas-reliefs relating to episodes in his life. The monument, built to plans from the Bologne sculptor Albert Thomas, was created on 12 September 1881. The bas-reliefs were created by sculptor Édouard Lormier. The statue and bas-reliefs were created by Gruet Jeune in Paris. The statue was moved and sheltered during the Second World War. It has moved many times, and is now in the place Sauvage, in front of the Post Office
- Achille : marble statue (Salon 1877), owned by the state (purchased by the Musée d'Orsay), presented at the Universal Exposition of 1878, kept at the Museum of Niort since 1881.
- Buste de Diderot : marble dated 1880, at the museum of Langres.
- La Hongrie : statue created for the palais du Champ de Mars at the Universal Exposition of 1878. The model of the statue (quarter sized) is kept at the museum in Tours, as well as the models of La Loi and La Prudence.
- Saint-Jean : bronze statue, created by the foundry of Martin (Salon 1876), in the museum of Alençon.
- Paris, palais du Louvre : the heads of satyrs adorn the external facade of the pavilion of Rohan and are by Lafrance. In 1876, to decorate the new facade of the pavilion de Flore, on the north side, architects contacted a number of sculptors, including Lafrance, who created the statues La Prudence (on the first floor) and La Loi (on the second floor).
