= Cape Northrop =

Coordinates: 67°24′S 65°16′W

Cape Northrop is a conspicuous, rocky bluff which rises to 1,160 m (3,810 ft), forming the north side of the entrance to Whirlwind Inlet, on the east coast of Graham Land, the northern portion of the Antarctic Peninsula, and dividing Foyn Coast and Bowman Coast. Discovered by Sir Hubert Wilkins on a flight of December 20, 1928, and named for Jack Northrop, designer of the Lockheed airplane used on the expedition. The cape was photographed by the United States Antarctic Service (USAS) in 1940 and charted by the Falkland Islands Dependencies Survey (FIDS) in 1947.

== See also ==
- Mamelon Point, located 11 nautical miles (20 km) east-northeast of Cape Northrop
