= Francavilla =

Francavilla may refer to:

== People ==
- Pietro Francavilla (1548–1615), Franco-Flemish sculptor
- Francesco Francavilla, Italian comic book artist
- Costanza d'Avalos, Duchess of Francavilla (1460–1541), noblewoman of Spanish origin

== Places in Italy ==
- Francavilla al Mare, a municipality of the Province of Chieti, Abruzzo
- Francavilla Angitola, a municipality of the Province of Vibo Valentia, Calabria
- Francavilla Bisio, a municipality of the Province of Alessandria, Piedmont
- Francavilla d'Ete, a municipality of the Province of Fermo, Marche
- Francavilla di Sicilia, a municipality of the Province of Messina, Sicily
- Francavilla Fontana, a municipality of the Province of Brindisi, Apulia
- Francavilla in Sinni, a municipality of the Province of Potenza, Basilicata
- Francavilla Marittima, a municipality of the Province of Cosenza, Calabria

== Other uses ==
- Francavilla Calcio (disambiguation), several football clubs
- Francavilla (grape), an Italian wine grape used to blend the Ostuni DOC

== See also ==
- Villafranca, a municipality of Navarre, Spain
- Villafranca (disambiguation)
