= Mamelon Point =

Mamelon Point (67°19′S 64°49′W) is a point 11 nautical miles (20 km) east-northeast of Cape Northrop on the east coast of Graham Land, Antarctica. The feature was charted as an island by the Falkland Islands Dependencies Survey in 1947 and given the name "Mamelon Island" because of its resemblance to a mamelon, a small, rounded hill or fort. Further exploration has disproved the insularity of the feature and the terminology has been altered accordingly.
