= Lingua franca (disambiguation) =

A lingua franca is a language used for communication between speakers of different languages.

Lingua Franca or lingua franca may also refer to:

- Mediterranean Lingua Franca, the lingua franca of the Mediterranean Basin for which the term is originally named
- Lingua Franca (film), a 2019 film directed by Isabel Sandoval
- Lingua Franca (magazine), a former periodical about intellectual and literary life in academia
- Lingua Franca (programming language), a synchronous embedded systems programming language
- "Linguafranc" (Japanese: リンガ・フランカ Ringa Furanka), a song by South Korean girl group Girls' Generation from the 2013 single Love & Girls
- Lingua Franca Nova, a constructed language based on Romance languages

== See also ==
- List of lingua francas
- Lingua (disambiguation)
- Franca (disambiguation)
