= Fernando E. Franca =

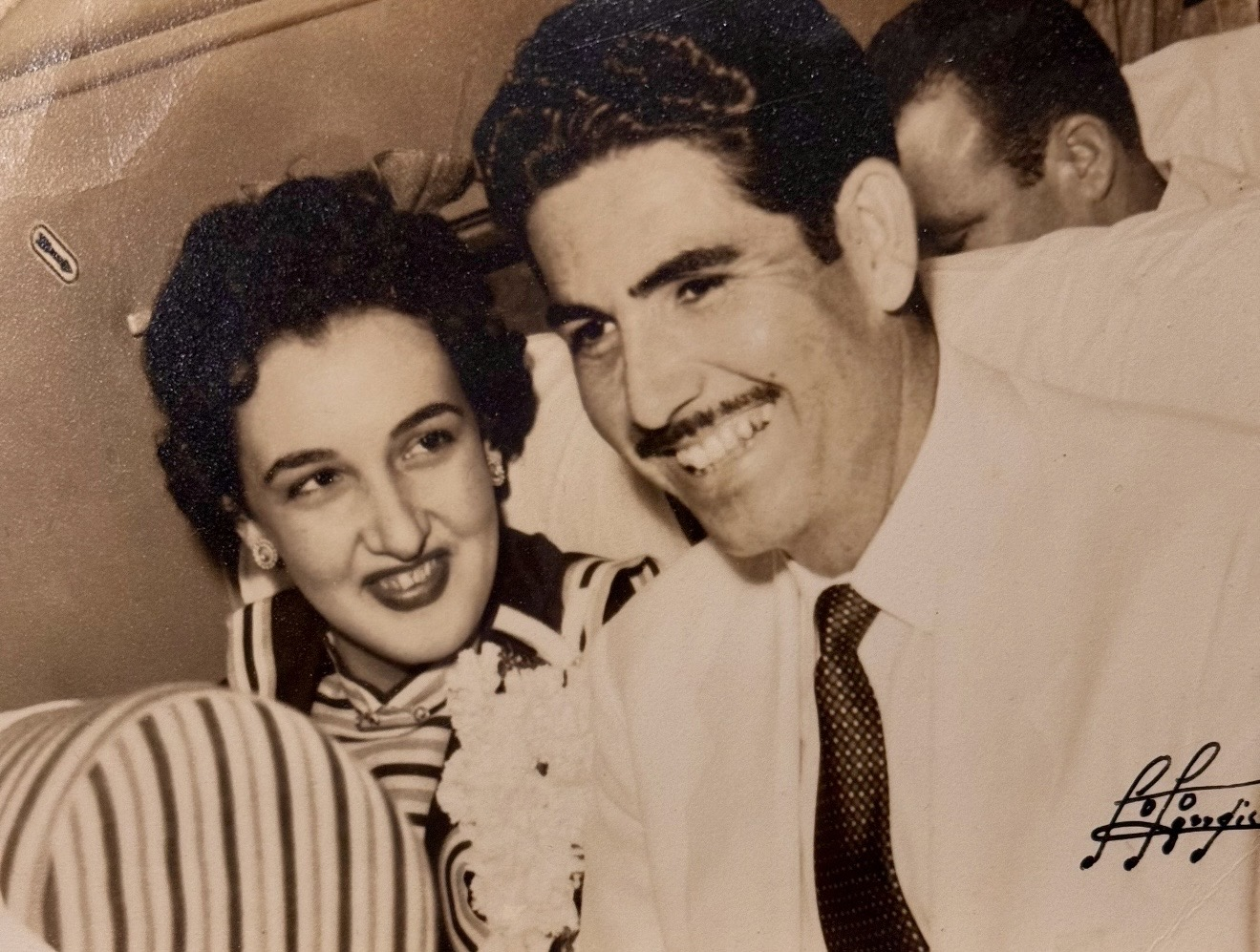
- Fernando E. Franca with his wife, Eva Quesada, in Havana, 1955
- Born: May 28, 1925; Havana, Cuba
- Died: July 1, 1992 (aged 67); Miami, Florida, U.S.
- Education: University of Havana; University of Salamanca; University of Miami
- Occupations: Physician, explorer, airplane pilot, inventor
- Known for: Antarctic service at Palmer Station; Franca Glacier
- Spouse: Eva Quesada Condis
- Children: 3

Dr. Fernando E. Franca (May 28, 1925 – July 1, 1992) was a Cuban-born physician, explorer, airplane pilot, and inventor who is recognized as the first documented Cuban to live and work in Antarctica, serving as Medical Officer and Station Manager at Palmer Station in 1974, whose work and inventions spanned clinical medicine, Havana nightlife, and Antarctic research.

== Early life and education ==
Fernando Estanislao Franca Martínez was born in Havana, Cuba, in 1925 to Dr. Fernando Franca Reguéira, a physician, and Marina Martínez Barreto. His family had been established in Havana since the 17th century. He was the younger of two children; his older sister, Olga Franca Martínez (married Sherwood Wolfer), was a lawyer. Dr. Franca was the cousin of economist Porfirio Franca y Álvarez de la Campa, who served as President of the Cuban Republic under the Pentarchy of 1933, and the nephew of physicist-mathematician Pablo Miquel Merino, a colleague and collaborator of Albert Einstein and the founder of the Society of Cuban Physics and Mathematics Sciences.

Dr. Franca was a graduate of Belen Jesuit Preparatory School in Havana, where one of his classmates was Fidel Castro. He held medical doctorates from the University of Havana, Cuba; the University of Salamanca, Spain; and the University of Miami, United States.

== Nightlife, family, and medical work ==
In the late 1940s and early 1950s, Franca created and ran nightclubs and cabarets in Old Havana and in Havana’s Chinatown. Among his many interests, Franca was an inventor, notably of medical and surgical instruments designed to ease the work of surgeons performing delicate procedures.

In 1955, Dr. Franca married Eva Quesada Condis in Havana, to whom he remained married until his death in 1992. They had two sons, both born in Havana: Frank Franca, a photographer based in New York City, and Eduardo Franca, a medical doctor in Miami.

Earlier, in 1950, Dr. Franca had married Julia Maria Velasco Morin. They had one son, Fernando Ramon Franca, a designer. Their marriage ended in divorce in 1953.

== Antarctic service ==
In 1973 and 1974, Dr. Franca served as the Medical Officer and Station Manager of Palmer Station in Antarctica.

Palmer Station is an American scientific research center for the study of marine biology. The station also houses year-round monitoring equipment for global seismic, atmospheric, and UV-monitoring networks, as well as facilities for heliophysics research. Palmer also hosts a radio receiver that studies lightning activity over the Western Hemisphere.

Dr. Franca is the first documented Cuban to live and work on the Antarctic continent. While living in Antarctica, he created a Cuban flag sewn from maritime signal flags. In 1974, he personally raised the handmade banner, marking the first recorded instance of a Cuban flag being flown on the Antarctic continent.

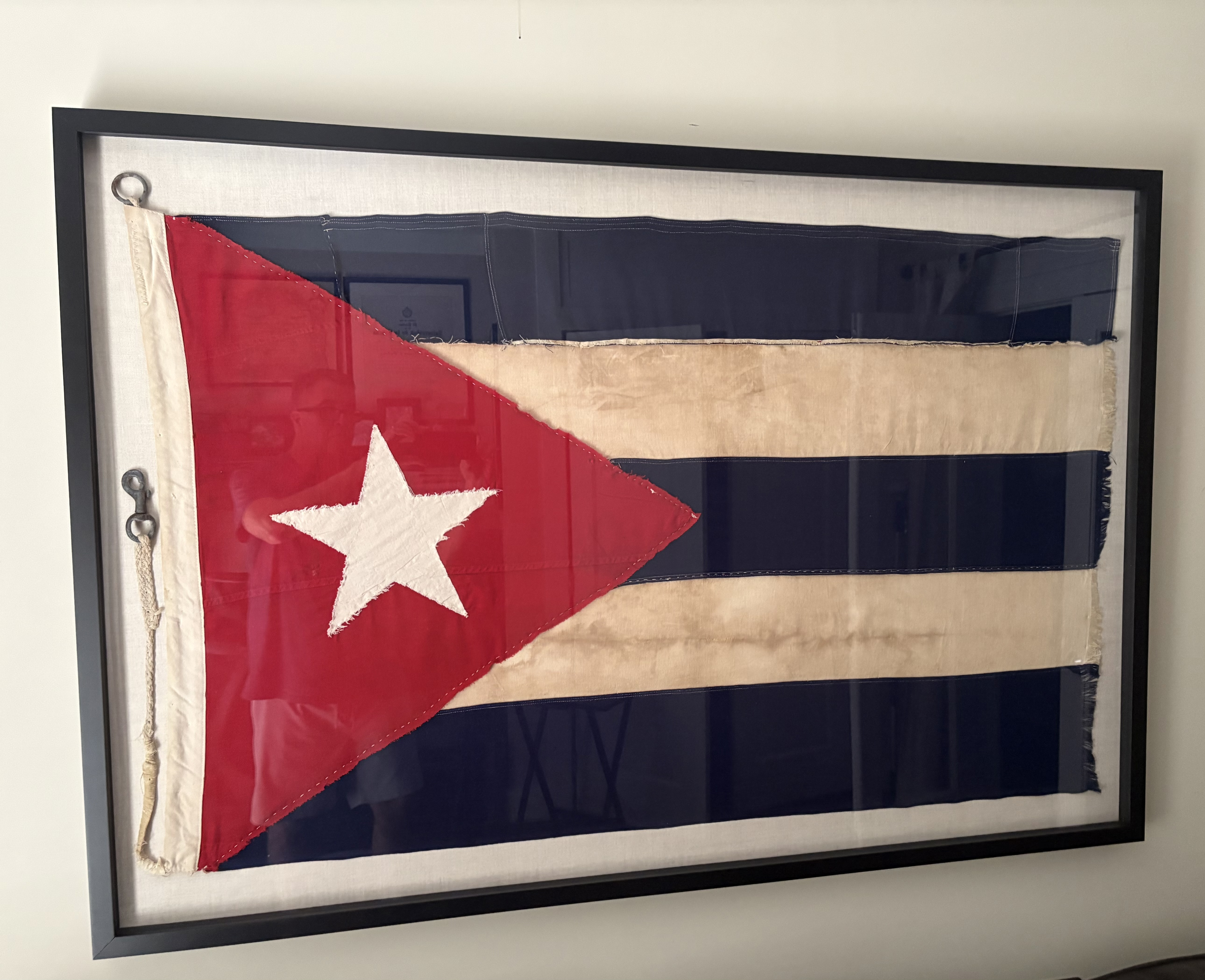
Cuban flag handcrafted by Dr. Fernando E. Franca from maritime signal flags while stationed in Antarctica.

Franca Glacier is a glacier in Antarctica named for Dr. Franca. It flows northeast into the head of Solberg Inlet, Bowman Coast, to the south of Houser Peak. It was photographed from the air by the United States Antarctic Service in 1940 and the U.S. Navy in 1966, surveyed by the Falkland Islands Dependencies Survey in 1946–48, and named by the Advisory Committee on Antarctic Names in 1977 after Fernando E. Franca, Medical Officer and Station Manager at Palmer Station in 1974.
