= Franca Glacier =

Glacier in Antarctica

Franca Glacier (68°23′S 65°34′W) named after Fernando E. Franca, is a glacier in Antarctica, flowing northeast into the head of Solberg Inlet, Bowman Coast, to the south of Houser Peak. The glacier was photographed from the air by the United States Antarctic Service, 1940, and the U.S. Navy, 1966. It was surveyed by the Falkland Islands Dependencies Survey, 1946–48, and named by the Advisory Committee on Antarctic Names in 1977 after Fernando E. Franca, Medical Officer and Station Manager, Palmer Station, 1974.
