= Villafranca de la Sierra =

- municipality
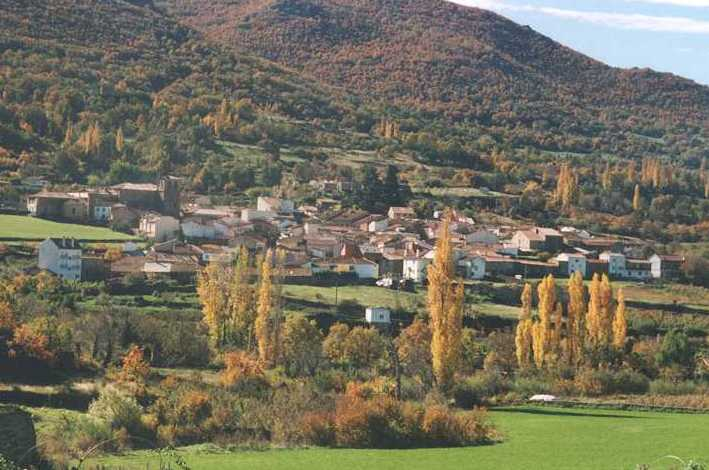

- Flag Coat of arms

- Location in Spain. Villafranca de la Sierra (Spain)
- Coordinates: 40°29′55″N 5°13′53″W
- Country: Spain
- Autonomous community: Castile and León
- Province: Ávila
- Municipality: Villafranca de la Sierra

Area
  - Total: 39 km^{2} (15 sq mi)

Population (2025-01-01)
  - Total: 128
  - Density: 3.3/km^{2} (8.5/sq mi)
- Time zone: UTC+1 (CET)
  - Summer (DST): UTC+2 (CEST)
- Website: Official website

Villafranca de la Sierra is a municipality located in the province of Ávila, Castile and León, Spain.

== Population ==
Historical population
Year	Pop.	±% p.a.
2023	130	—
2024	134	+3.08%
2025	128	−4.48%
Source: INE

== Monuments ==
=== Our Lady of the Assumption Parish Church ===
Our Lady of the Assumption Parish Church is from the fifteenth century, made of hewn stone, with a single storey nave belfry tower. It sits on an earlier Romanesque temple. The oldest part, possibly from the fourteenth century, is the chapel which is closed in a semicircle. The altarpiece is dated 1690. The apse is circular, with two lateral entrances, rebuilt in 1600. Its single nave has three semicircular arches with rich moldings, with balls in their chapiters, and rather complicated bases. Perhaps the nave did not rest on them, but on armor skirts, but what is visible today are plaster vaults. The main arch is likewise round, rebuilt in the sixteenth century. But the chapel is perhaps older than the nave, closed in a semicircle.

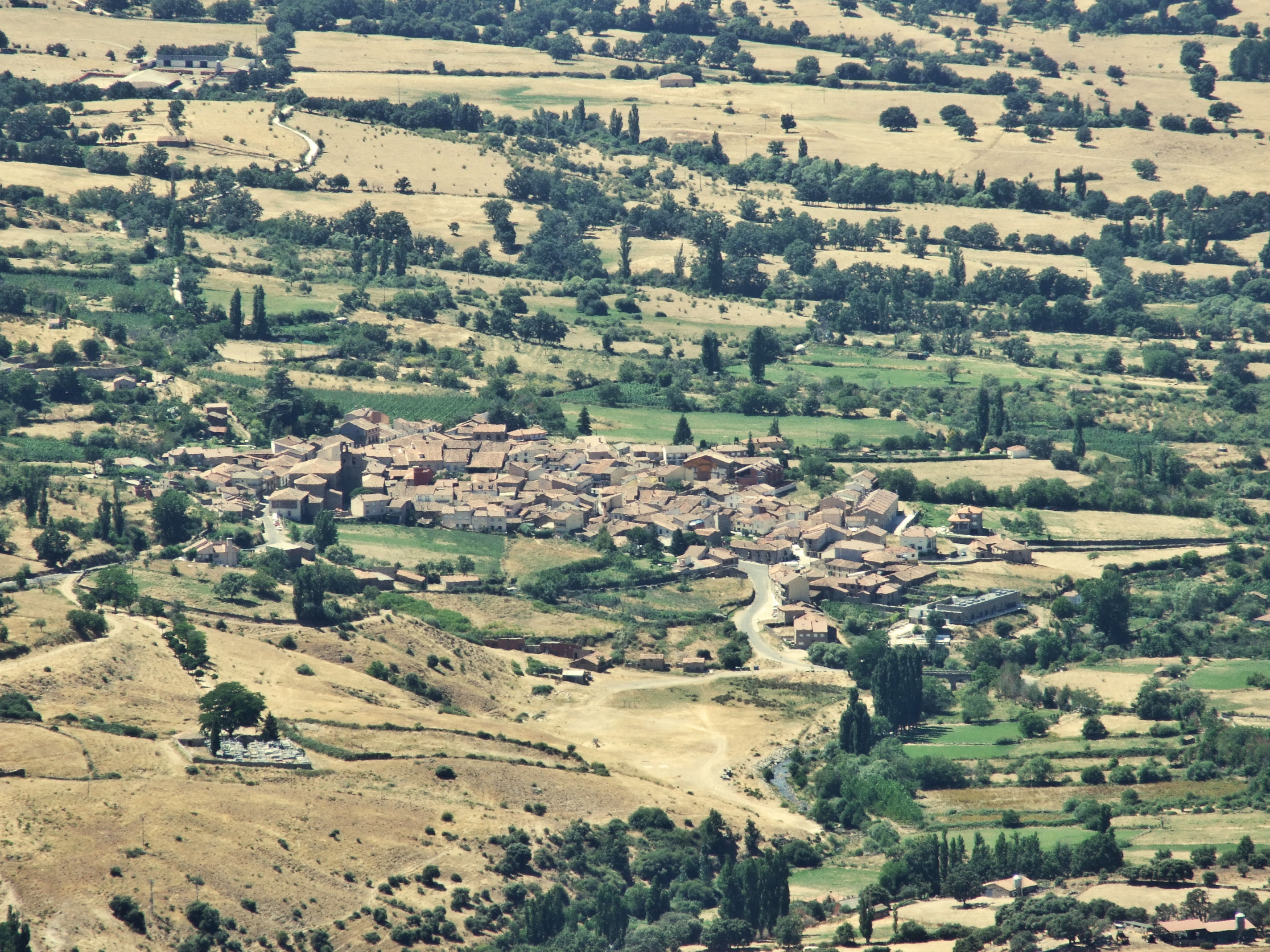
View of Villafranca de la Sierra from Pena Levante
