= Frédéric Sauvage =

French boat builder

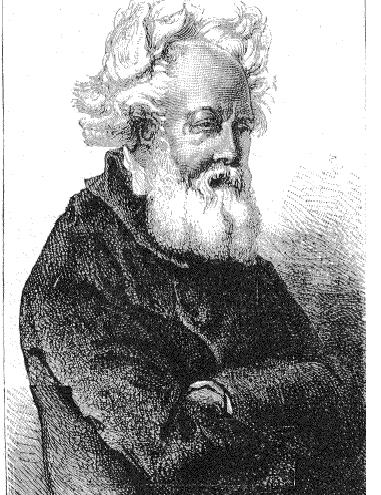
Frédéric Sauvage.

Frédéric Sauvage (20 September 1786 – 17 July 1857) was a French boat builder who carried out early tests of screw-type marine propellers.

Sauvage was born at Boulogne-sur-Mer. In a public demonstration with a small boat on 15 January 1832 in Honfleur, he was able to show that a propeller is more efficient than the then standard paddle-wheels located on the sides of the boat. In 1842, he built the steamer Napoléon in a joint venture with shipbuilder Augustin Normand. However, he was not able to interest the French Navy in his idea and when he tried to develop it commercially on his own he was not successful, went bankrupt and landed in debtor’s prison for a time. Today, the practical development of propellers is generally credited to the Czech-born Josef Ressel, who took out patents in 1827, although Sauvage was clearly a pioneer.
