= Eurilda Loomis France =

American painter (1865–1931)

- Born: Eurilda Q. Loomis; 1865; Pittsburgh, Pennsylvania, US
- Died: 1931 (aged 65–66); New Haven, Connecticut, US
- Education: Académie Julian
- Known for: Painting
- Spouse: Jesse Leach France (m. 1889)

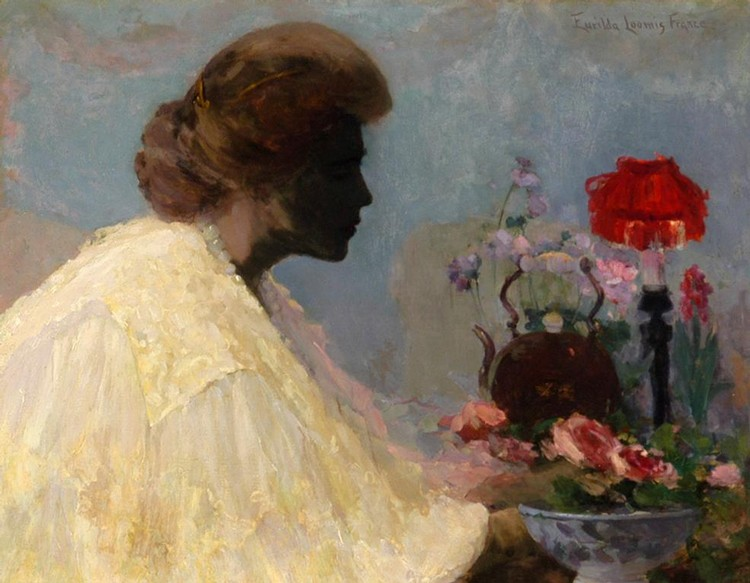
Arranging Spring Flowers

Eurilda Q. Loomis France (1865–1931) was an American painter.

== Biography ==
France née Loomis was born in 1865, in Pittsburgh. She traveled to Paris, France where she was taught by Jules Joseph Lefebvre and Jean-Joseph Benjamin-Constant. She also studied at the Académie Julian with Carolus-Duran.

She married fellow artist Jesse Leach France on January 24, 1889.

In 1890, France exhibited her painting at the Paris Salon. She exhibited her work at the Woman's Building at the 1893 World's Columbian Exposition in Chicago, Illinois. She also exhibited her work at the Pennsylvania Academy of the Fine Arts and the National Academy of Design.

France was a member of American Federation of Arts, the Society of Independent Artists, and the New Haven Paint and Clay Club .

France died in 1931, aged 65 or 66, in New Haven, Connecticut.
