= Franca (given name) =

Franca is a feminine given name which may refer to:

- Franca Afegbua (1943–2023), Nigerian politician, first elected woman senator in Nigeria
- Franca Arena (born 1937), Australian politician and activist
- Franca Bettoia (born 1936), Italian actress
- Franca Bianconi (born 1962), Italian figure skating coach and former competitor
- Franca Faldini (1931–2016), Italian writer, journalist and actress
- Franca Florio (1873–1950), Italian noblewoman and socialite
- Franca Helg (1920–1989), Italian designer and architect
- Franca Masu (born 1962), Italian singer and songwriter
- Franca Mattiucci (born 1938), Italian retired operatic mezzo-soprano
- Franca Parisi (born 1933), Italian actress
- Franca Raimondi (1932–1988), Italian singer
- Franca Rame (1929–2013), Italian theatre actress, playwright and political activist
- Franca Scagnetti (1924–1999), Italian film actress
- Franca Sozzani (1950–2016), Italian journalist and longtime editor-in-chief of Vogue Italia
- Franca Squarciapino (born 1940), Italian Oscar-winning costume designer
- Franca Treur (born 1979), Dutch writer and freelance journalist
- Franca Viola (born 1948), Italian woman who became famous in the 1960s in Italy for refusing to marry her rapist
- Franca Visalta (1170–1218), also known as Franca of Piacenza, Catholic saint and Cistercian abbess
