= Ricardo França =

Brazilian politician (born 1991)

Member of the Legislative Assembly of São Paulo
- Incumbent
- Assumed office 15 March 2023

Personal details
- Born: 25 May 1991 (age 34)
- Party: Podemos (since 2020)

Ricardo Longatti França (born 25 May 1991) is a Brazilian politician serving as a member of the Legislative Assembly of São Paulo since 2023. From 2017 to 2023, he was a municipal councillor of Indaiatuba.
