= LaFrance-Republic =

Truck manufacturing company

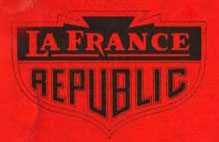
- Predecessor: Republic Motor Truck Company, American LaFrance
- Founded: 1929
- Defunct: 1932
- Fate: Bought by Sterling Motor Truck Company
- Successor: Sterling Motor Truck Company
- Products: Trucks

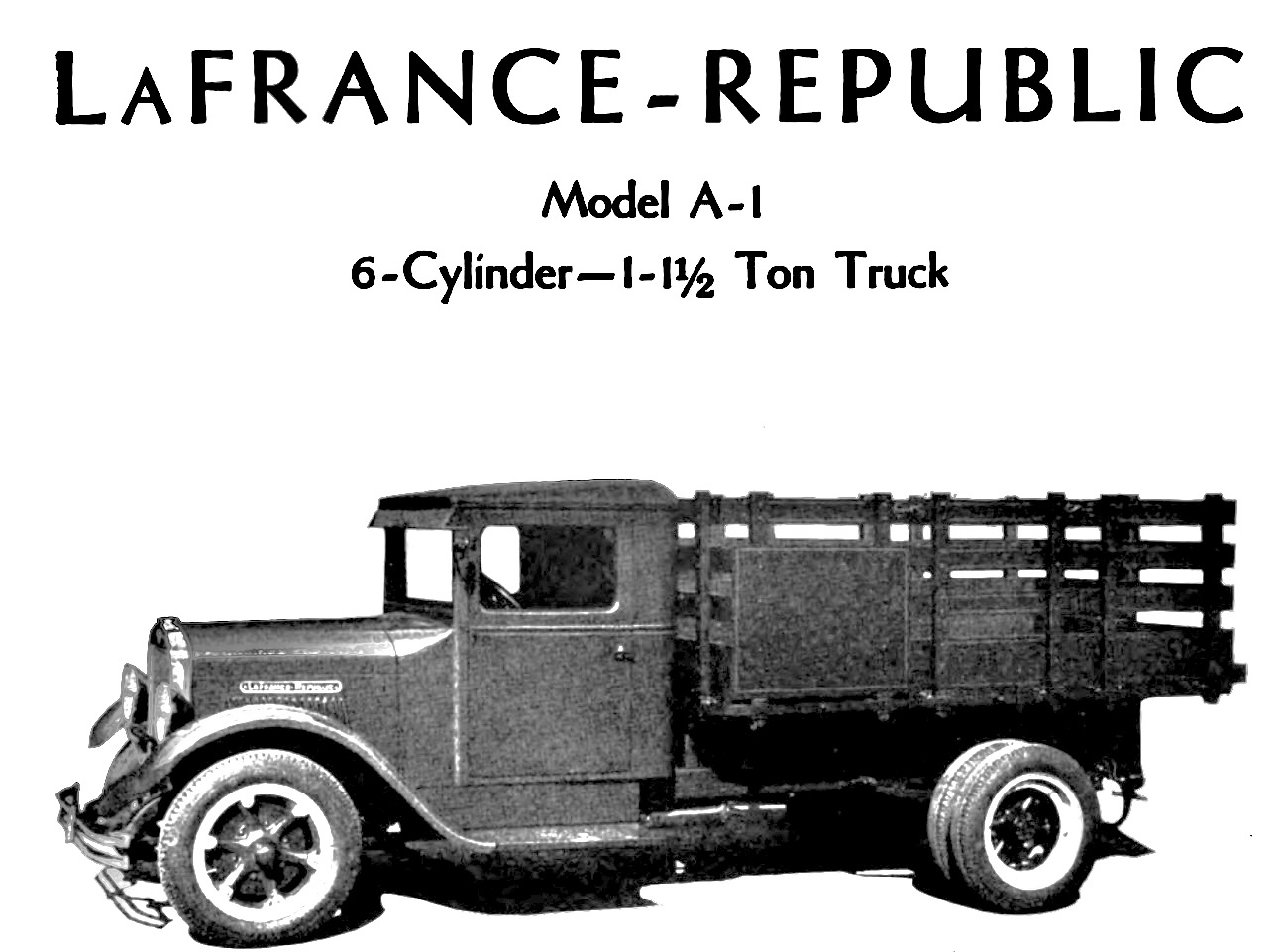
LaFrance-Republic Model A-1 (1930-1932)

LaFrance-Republic was a truck manufacturing company that was established in 1929 in Michigan as a merger of the Republic Motor Truck Company and American LaFrance. The company introduced a one-ton model in November 1929, and a "super truck" called the Mogul in 1931 powered by a 240 hp twelve-cylinder American-La France engine2. The Model F2 was produced from 1930-1932. However, the company's fortunes did not improve, and it was eventually bought by Sterling Motor Truck Company.
