= Pointe LaFrance, New Brunswick =

Coordinates: 47.442363°N 64.979533°W

Pointe LaFrance is an unincorporated place in New Brunswick, Canada. It is recognized as a designated place by Statistics Canada.

== Demographics ==
In the 2021 Census of Population conducted by Statistics Canada, Pointe LaFrance had a population of 682 living in 299 of its 316 total private dwellings, a change of -3.7% from its 2016 population of 708. With a land area of 6.69 km^{2} (2.58 sq mi), it had a population density of 101.9/km^{2} (264.0/sq mi) in 2021.

== See also ==
- List of communities in New Brunswick
