= Juan de Villafranca =

Mexican diplomat and lawyer (born 1954)

Juan de Villafranca is a lawyer graduated from Universidad Iberoamericana, and a businessman, public server and diplomat, born in Mexico in 1954. He is Executive President of AMELAF (Mexican Association of Pharmaceutical Laboratories). He has been Director General of Marking Services de Mexico, a subsidiary of Marking Services Inc. He was CEO of Pegaso Media (Out of Home Publicity). In 2000 he started a career in the private sector as a consultant.

He was Ambassador of Mexico to Singapore, Brunei and Myanmar, and has held senior positions in the Mexican Government, including: Commissioner of Patents and Trade Marks, Undersecretary of Foreign Affairs. Before going to Singapore he was Chief of Staff of Fernando Solana who was the Mexican Secretary of Foreign Affairs. Was Chairman of the General Assembly of the World Intellectual Property Organization WIPO, in those days Arpad Bogsch was the Director General of WIPO.

He served as Comptroller of the Secretary of Tourism.

He led many projects of modernization within the Mexican Government, the first official use of Internet service by the Mexican Government to private users was the consultation of trademarks in 1987. While in Singapore he promoted very intensively the economic relations generating a growth of trade and projects of foreign investment to Mexico. Participated in the efforts of México to become a member of APEC.

A top Mexican squash player he played in many tournaments against players like Sharif Khan, Victor Niederhoffer, Peter Briggs, and Gordon Anderson. He won the Mexican Championship six times, the US Intercollegiate twice, and was highly ranked in the world. In 2000 he was inducted to Hall of Fame of the National Intercollegiate Squash Rackets Association. He taught International Law in the Universidad Iberoamericana. He was Vice President of Club Necaxa, one of the Mexico's First Division soccer teams.
