= Vilafranca (medieval town) =

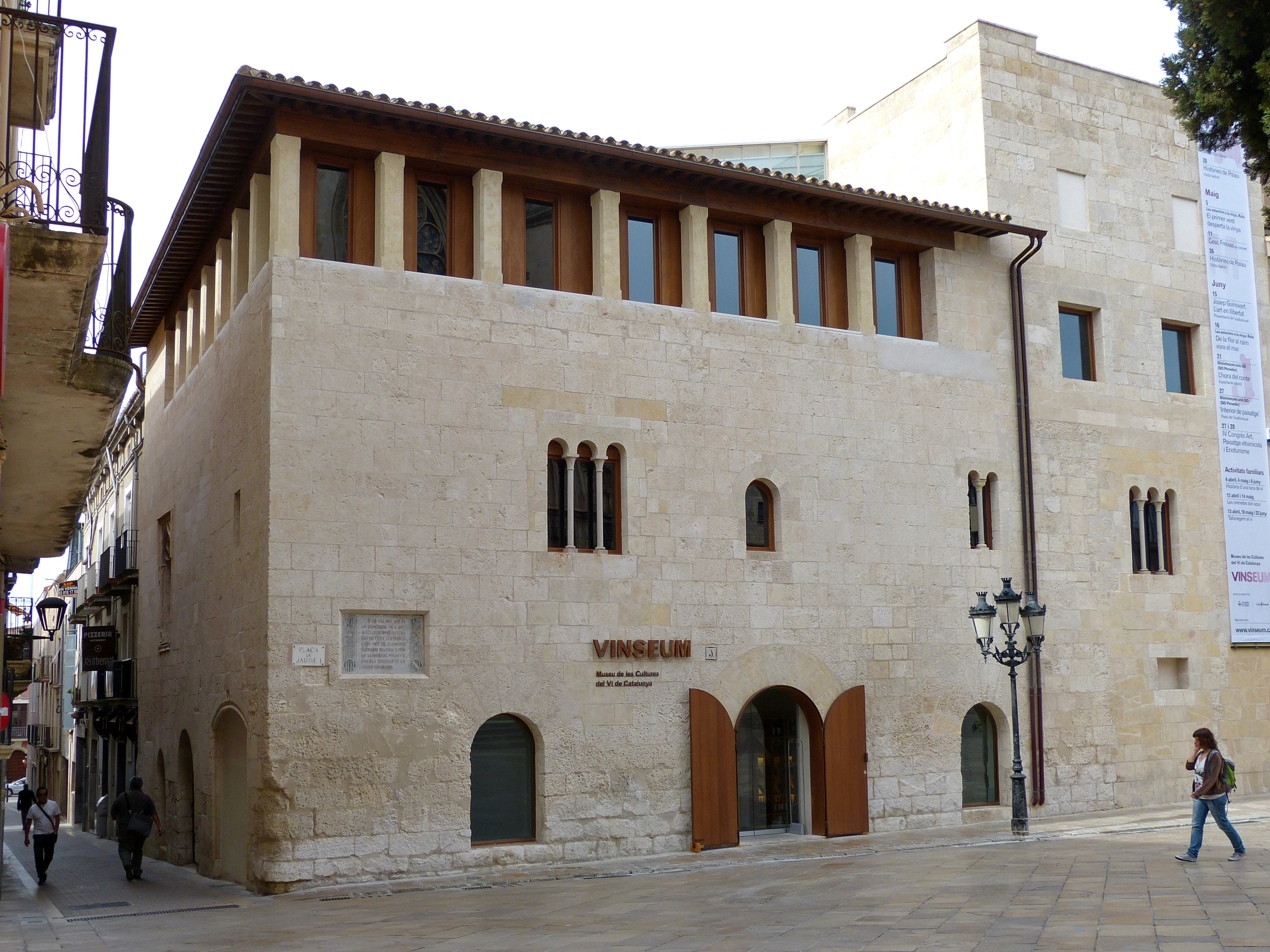
"Ex-Palau Reial" from Vilafranca del Penedès, a typical "Vilafranca".

Vilafranca (in Catalan and most languages), Villefranche (in French) or Borgo Franco (in Italian) is understood as the legal status of a medieval community free of duties or with fiscal privileges, alternately performing military services.

== Examples ==
=== Italy ===
- Borgo Agnello (Novara) at the beginning of the 13th century
- Serravalle Sesia in 1255
- Paganico (Grosseto, also called "Borgo Franco" because of these exemptions)
- Castelfranco Veneto (Treviso) in 1199
- Soncino in 1118, one of the oldest
- Robecco d'Oglio (Cremona) in 1185
- Trino (Vercelli)
- Villa d'Adda (Bergamo) in 1193

== Vilafranca vs Vilanova ==
The vilafranca or vilanova were new population centers that arose during the Middle Ages, especially between the 12th and 14th centuries in Catalonia and the rest of Iberian Peninsula, in Italy, France and Germany. The phenomenon assumed particular characteristics in north-central Italy, with multiple "Villanuova".

These new settlements did not arise spontaneously, but were always the result of the initiative of the territorial lords or, in most cases, of ordinary citizens who proceeded to found a Vilafranca or a Vilanova to extend their control over the territory. and increase their income. In most cases, the main reason for the new foundation was political, but military or economic reasons related to territorial control could also be involved. The new foundations were not always successful. During the Middle Ages there were cases of bankruptcy that can be attributed to various reasons, including: lack of commitment and planning by the institutions; lack of cohesion among the inhabitants of the new community. The founder of the new settlement encouraged, or sometimes forced, the peasants to settle in the new settlements by granting them less heavy taxation or even tax exemption for a certain period of time, hence the name vilafranca.

Although unique models cannot be produced for these new foundations, archaeologists have found some recurring features in these new settlements. They are planned settlements, often inspired by the mother city, with an orthogonal plan and generally defended by a wall; The internal plot, quite regular, has a central square, around which the main buildings (such as the town hall and the church) and houses are built, built in rows and in lots pre-established at the time of design.

These villages usually consisted of no more than 200 houses and many of them disappeared with the agrarian crisis of the fourteenth century.

== Equivalent place names ==
- Equivalent place names of Vilafranca in other languages are: villafranca (Italian), villefranche (French), vilafranca (Portuguese), villafranca (Spanish), Freistadt, Freiburg/Freiburgo, Fristrup, Freyburg (German).
- Equivalent place names of Vilanova in other languages are: villanuova (Italian), villeneuve (French), vilanova (Portuguese), villanueva (Spanish), Freistadt, Freiburg/Freiburgo, Fristrup, Freyburg (German)

== Bibliography ==
- P. Grillo, Borghi franchi e lotte di fazione: tre fondazioni vercellesi negli anni 1269-1270, in “Studi Storici”, year 42, no. 2, 2001, p. 397-411
- P. Guglielmotti, Villenove e borghi franchi: esperienze di ricerca e problemi di metodo, in «Archivio Storico Italiano», vol. 166, no. 1 (615), 2008, p. 79-96.
- R. Rao, La proprietà allodiale civica dei borghi nuovi vercellesi (prima metà del XIII secolo), in «Studi Storici», year 42, no. 2, 2001, p. 373-395.
- Villaggi scomparsi e borghi nuovi nel Piemonte medievale, edited by R. Comba, R.Rao, Society for historical, archaeological and artistic studies of the province of Cuneo, Cuneo 2011.
