= France Ahčin =

Slovene sculptor

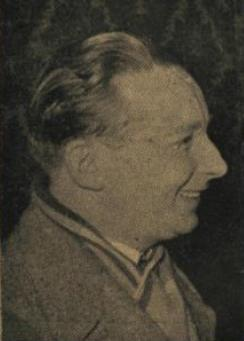
France Ahčin

France Ahčin (August 13, 1919 – June 21, 1989) was a Slovene sculptor. He studied sculpture at the academy in Florence between 1943 and 1945. He emigrated to Argentina in 1947. He created many portraits, reliefs and little plastic art in burned clay and bronze. He is the author of many sculptures in churches in Buenos Aires.

== Biography ==
=== Early life and Argentina ===
He grew up in Domžale, Slovenia. His father was a tailor, but he did not follow his steps, although he had his talent, which he decided to develop in a different way. His first works of art date to when he was 14 years old, when he mostly used wood for making sculptures. He attended the technical secondary school in Ljubljana, and later moved to Florence with his uncle, Ivan. Both emigrated to Argentina in 1947. France made sculptures for many churches, and many of his sculptures are in the church of Nuestra Señora de Lourdes, in Santos Lugares, provincia de Buenos Aires, as well as the church Maria Reina in Lanus.

In the late 60's he had the idea of starting his own ceramic industry. He took advantage of the use of clay and the industrial ovens to bake many of his works of art. Still, wood was one of his favourite materials. As from the 1980s, he started using the fast-growing wood from the tree "kiri", which is very easy to work with and is of fine appearance.

=== Returning home ===
Although his life in Argentina was successful, he always pined for his hometown and country. His dream came true in January 1989, when he travelled to Slovenia with 107 works of art, all of which he donated to his motherland, just a few months before dying back in Argentina, on 21 June 1989.
