= Three Slice Nunatak =

Nunatak in Graham Land, Antarctica

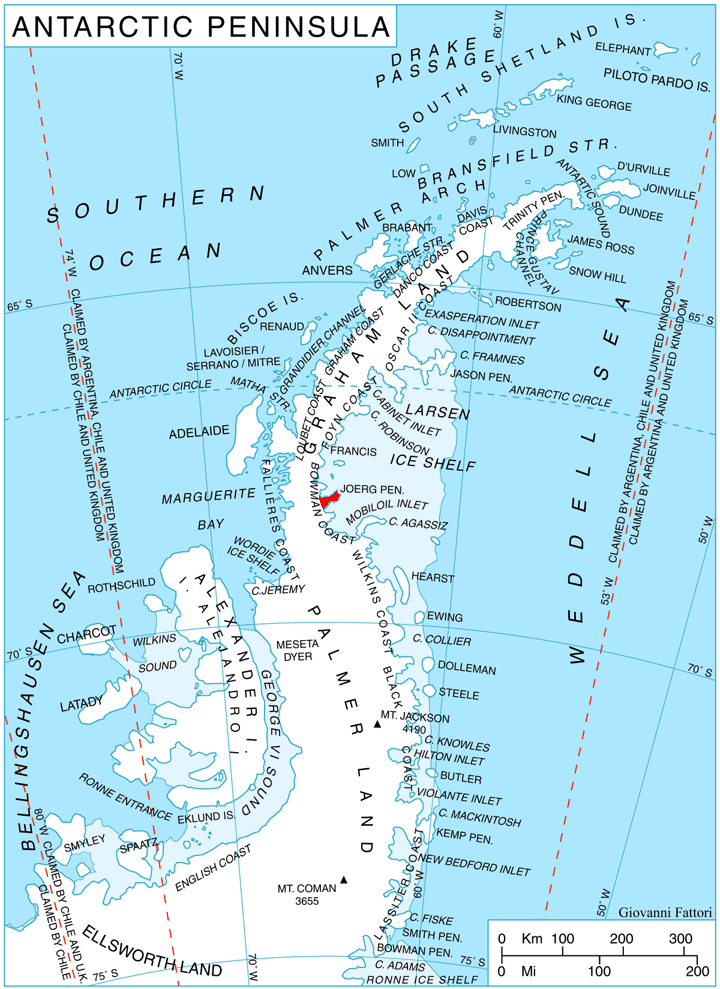
Location of Joerg Peninsula in Graham Land, Antarctic Peninsula.

Three Slice Nunatak (68°2′S 64°57′W) is a conspicuous nunatak rising to 500 m, surmounting the low, ice-covered northeast extremity of Joerg Peninsula on the east coast of Graham Land. This distinctive landmark, in the form of a serrated ridge 1.5 nautical miles (2.8 km) long, is snow-covered, except for the three almost vertical rock faces which suggest its name. Discovered and named by members of East Base of the United States Antarctic Service (USAS) who surveyed this area on land and from the air in 1940.
