= Joerg Peninsula =

Peninsula in Antarctica

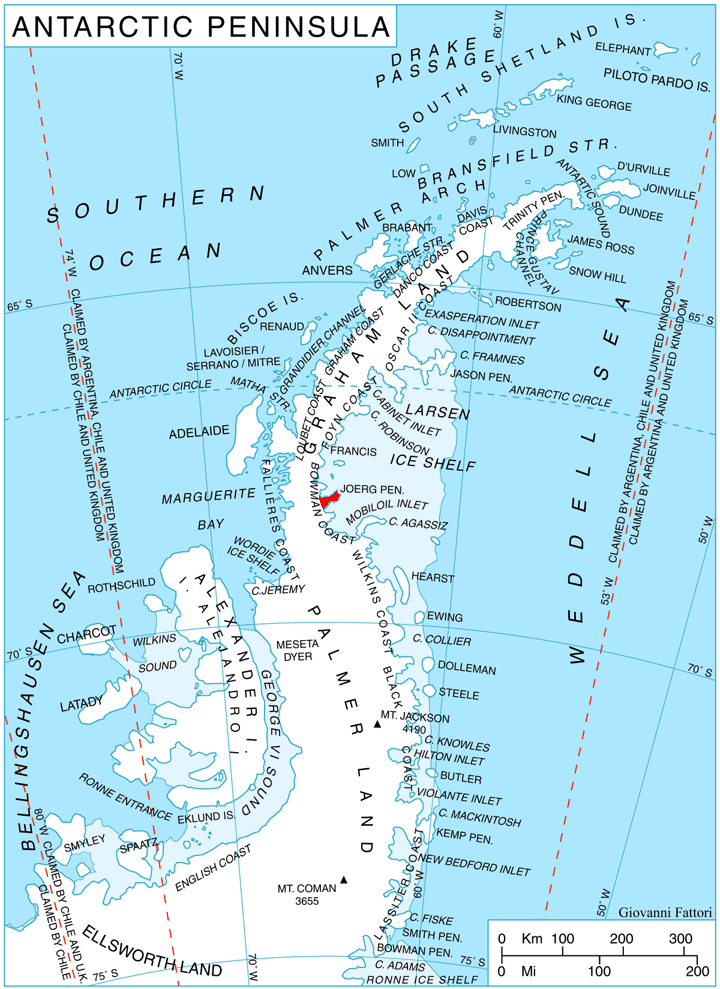
Location of Joerg Peninsula in Graham Land, Antarctic Peninsula.

Joerg Peninsula (68°11′S 65°10′W) is a rugged, mountainous peninsula, 22 nautical miles (41 km) long in a northeast–southwest direction and from 3 to 10 nautical miles (6 to 19 km) wide, lying between Trail Inlet and Solberg Inlet on the Bowman Coast of Graham Land, Antarctica. Its tip is indented by Hondius Inlet. The peninsula lies in the area explored from the air by Sir Hubert Wilkins in 1928 and Lincoln Ellsworth in 1935, and its south coast was mapped by W.L.G. Joerg from air photographs taken by Ellsworth. It was further mapped and photographed from the air by the United States Antarctic Service in 1940, and was surveyed by the Falkland Islands Dependencies Survey in 1947. The peninsula was named by the UK Antarctic Place-Names Committee after W.L.G. Joerg (1885–1952), who was an American geographer, polar cartographer, and archivist, and who made important contributions to Antarctic cartography, nomenclature and history. Joerg was Chairman of the United States Board on Geographic Names Special Committee on Antarctic Names, 1943–47, and was a member of the Advisory Committee on Antarctic Names, 1947–52.

== See also ==
- Pylon Point
