= Bowman Coast =

Coordinates: 68°10′S 65°00′W

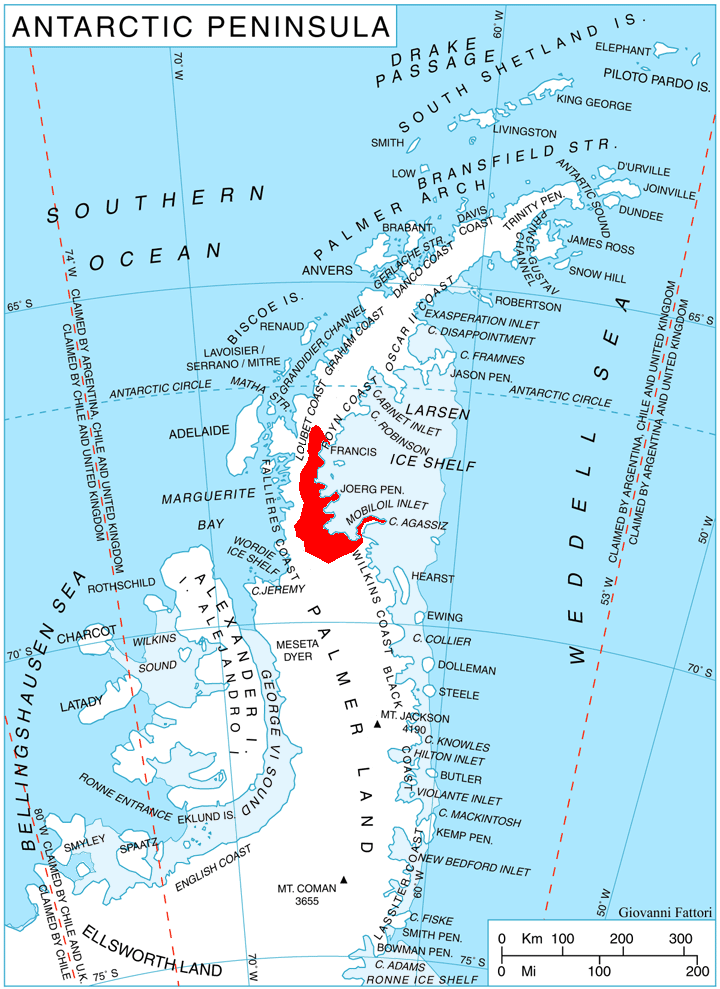
Location of Bowman Coast on the Antarctic Peninsula

The Bowman Coast is the portion of the east coast of the Antarctic Peninsula between Cape Northrop and Cape Agassiz. It was discovered by Sir Hubert Wilkins in an aerial flight of 20 December 1928. It was named by Wilkins for Isaiah Bowman, then Director of the American Geographical Society.

== Maps ==
- Antarctic Digital Database (ADD). Scale 1:250000 topographic map of Antarctica. Scientific Committee on Antarctic Research (SCAR). Since 1993, regularly upgraded and updated.

== See also ==
- Graham Land
