= Kashin Glacier =

Glacier in Graham Land, Antarctica

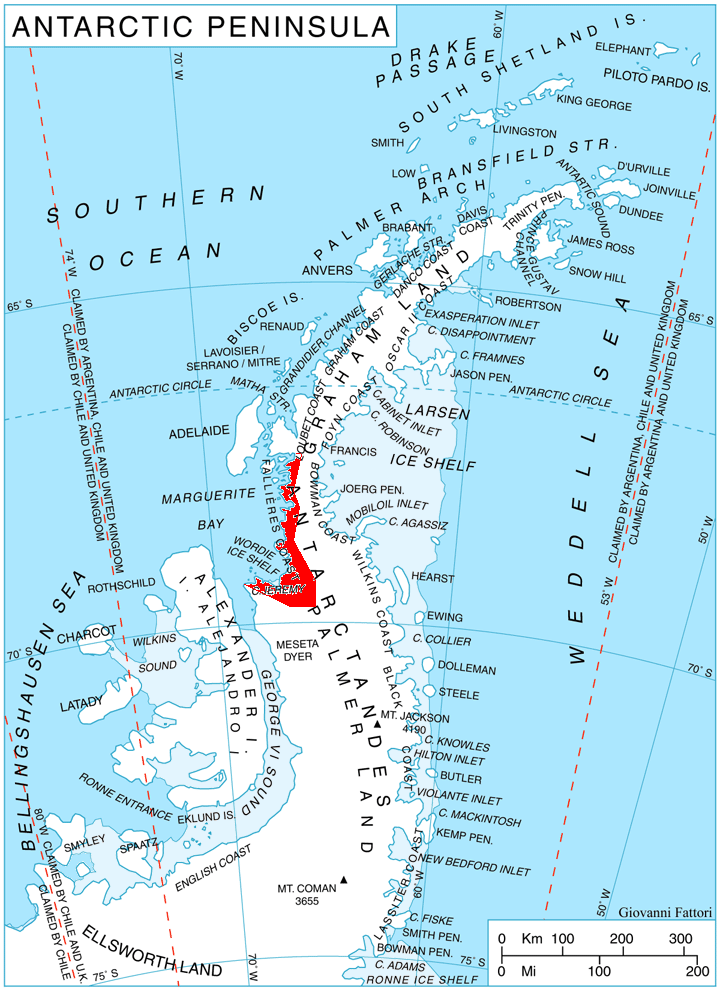
Location of Fallières Coast on the Antarctic Peninsula.

Kashin Glacier (Bulgarian: ледник Къшин, romanized: lednik Kashin, IPA: [ˈlɛdnik kɐˈʃin]) is the 8 km long and 2.7 km wide glacier on Fallières Coast in Graham Land, Antarctica. It is situated southwest of Perutz Glacier, north of Marvodol Glacier and east-southeast of Bader Glacier, flows northward between Shapkarev Buttress and Rudozem Heights, and flows into Bourgeois Fjord next southwest of Perutz Glacier.

The glacier is named after the settlement of Kashin in Northern Bulgaria.

== Location ==
Kashin Glacier is centred at 67°38′20″S 66°35′10″W. British mapping in 1978.

== Maps ==
- Antarctic Digital Database (ADD). Scale 1:250000 topographic map of Antarctica. Scientific Committee on Antarctic Research (SCAR). Since 1993, regularly upgraded and updated.
- British Antarctic Territory. Scale 1:200000 topographic map. DOS 610 Series, Sheet W 67 66. Directorate of Overseas Surveys, Tolworth, UK, 1978.
