= Shapkarev Buttress =

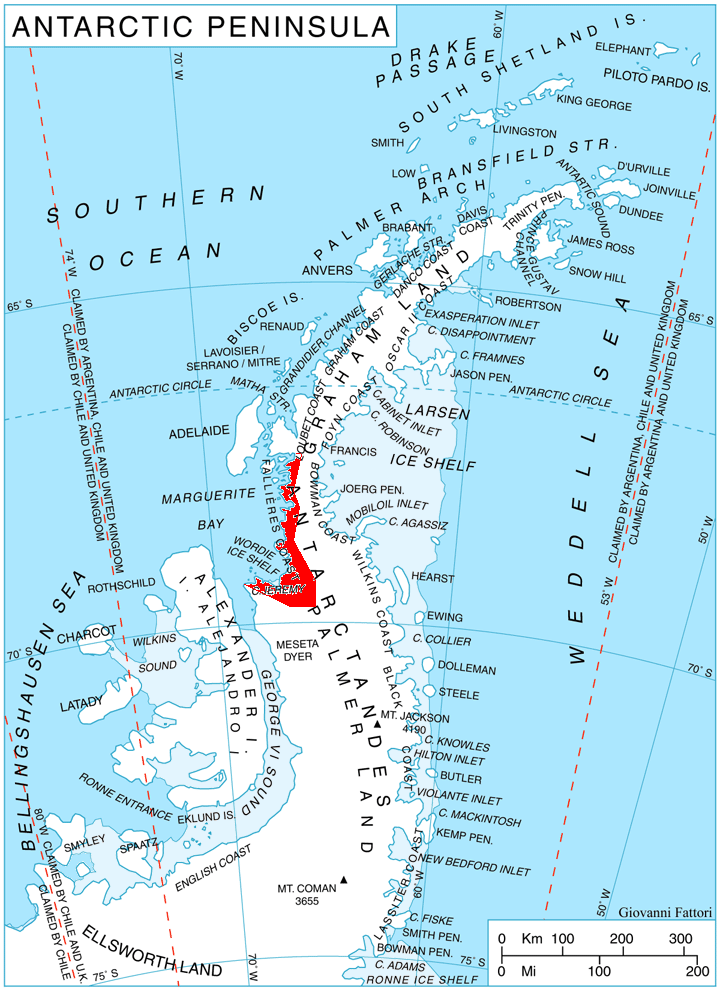
Location of Fallières Coast on the Antarctic Peninsula.

Shapkarev Buttress (Bulgarian: Шапкарев рид, ‘Shapkarev Rid’ \shap-'ka-rev 'rid\) is the rounded, mostly ice-covered buttress extending 13 km in east-west direction and 16 km in north-south direction, rising to 1625 m on the west side of Hemimont Plateau on Fallières Coast in Graham Land, Antarctica. The feature has steep and partly ice-free south, west and north slopes, and surmounts Forbes Glacier to the south, Marvodol Glacier and Kashin Glacier to the west, and Perutz Glacier to the north.

The buttress is named after the Bulgarian folklorist and ethnographer Kuzman Shapkarev (1834–1909).

== Location ==
Shapkarev Buttress is located at 67°40′40″S 66°27′30″W, which is 12.7 km south of Hayduta Buttress, 18.2 km north-northeast of Bunovo Peak and 11.4 km east-northeast of Glavinitsa Peak. British mapping in 1978.

== Maps ==
- Antarctic Digital Database (ADD). Scale 1:250000 topographic map of Antarctica. Scientific Committee on Antarctic Research (SCAR). Since 1993, regularly upgraded and updated.
- British Antarctic Territory. Scale 1:200000 topographic map. DOS 610 Series, Sheet W 67 66. Directorate of Overseas Surveys, Tolworth, UK, 1978.
