= Marvodol Glacier =

Glacier in Graham Land, Antarctica

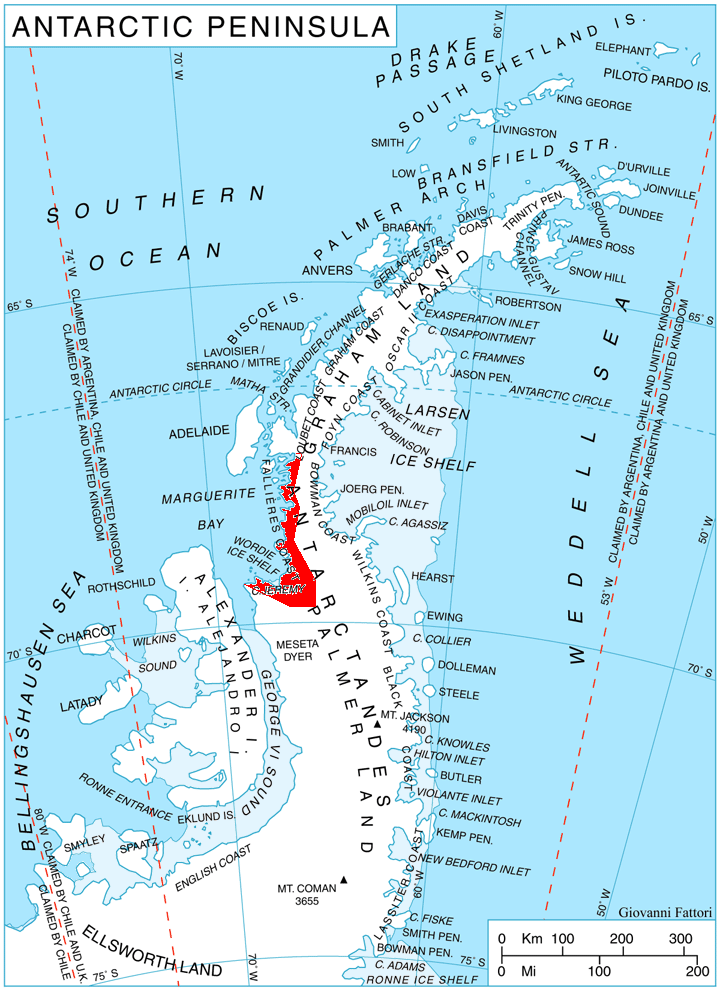
Location of Fallières Coast on the Antarctic Peninsula.

Marvodol Glacier (Bulgarian: ледник Мърводол, romanized: lednik Marvodol, IPA: [ˈlɛdnik mɐrvoˈdɔɫ]) is the 9.3 km long and 3.7 km wide glacier on Fallières Coast in Graham Land, Antarctica. It is situated south of Kashin Glacier, north of Forbes Glacier and east-southeast of Bucher Glacier, flows southwards between Shapkarev Buttress and Rudozem Heights, turns west at Stanhope Towers, and flows into Dogs Leg Fjord.

The glacier is named after the settlement of Marvodol in Western Bulgaria.

== Location ==
Marvodol Glacier is centred at 67°43′00″S 66°37′00″W. British mapping in 1978.

== Maps ==
- Antarctic Digital Database (ADD). Scale 1:250000 topographic map of Antarctica. Scientific Committee on Antarctic Research (SCAR). Since 1993, regularly upgraded and updated.
- British Antarctic Territory. Scale 1:200000 topographic map. DOS 610 Series, Sheet W 67 66. Directorate of Overseas Surveys, Tolworth, UK, 1978.
