= Hayduta Buttress =

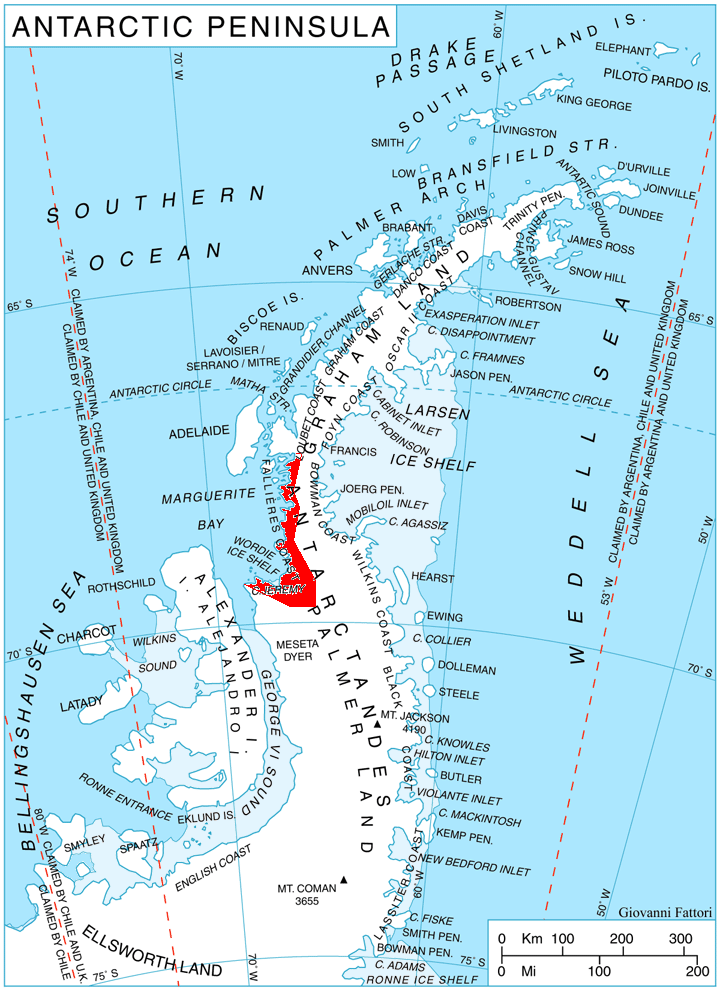
Location of Fallières Coast on the Antarctic Peninsula.

Hayduta Buttress (Bulgarian: рид Хайдута, ‘Rid Hayduta’ \'rid hay-'du-ta\) is the rounded, mostly ice-covered buttress 13.5 km long in E-W direction and 7.5 km wide, rising to 1287 m on the west side of Hemimont Plateau on Fallières Coast in Graham Land, Antarctica. The feature has steep and partly ice-free south, west and north slopes, and surmounts Perutz Glacier to the south, Blind Bay to the west and Barnes Glacier to the north.

The buttress is named after Hayduta Peak in Rila Mountain, Bulgaria.

== Location ==
Hayduta Buttress is located at 67°33′50″S 66°26′45″W, which is 13 km south-southwest of Smilyan Bastion, 12.7 km north of Shapkarev Buttress, 14.25 km northeast of Glavinitsa Peak and 7.17 km east-southeast of Chertigrad Point. British mapping in 1978.

== Maps ==
- Antarctic Digital Database (ADD). Scale 1:250000 topographic map of Antarctica. Scientific Committee on Antarctic Research (SCAR). Since 1993, regularly upgraded and updated.
- British Antarctic Territory. Scale 1:200000 topographic map. DOS 610 Series, Sheet W 67 66. Directorate of Overseas Surveys, Tolworth, UK, 1978.
