= Bunovo Peak =

Rocky peak in Graham Land, Antarctica

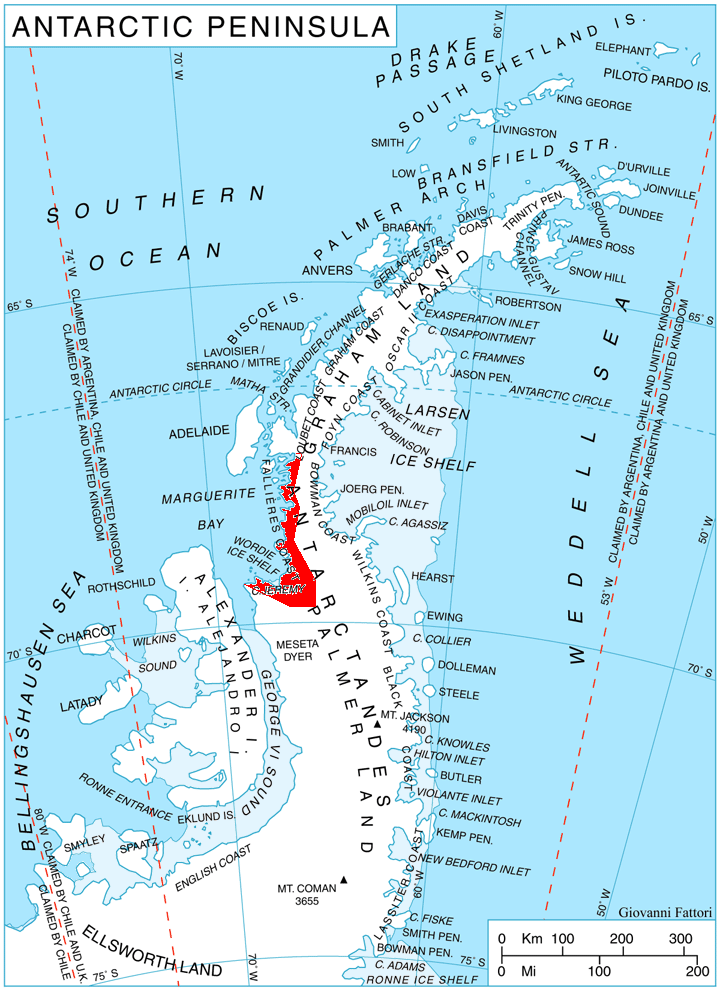
Location of Fallières Coast on the Antarctic Peninsula.

Bunovo Peak (Bulgarian: връх Буново, romanized: vrah Bunovo, IPA: [ˈvrɤɣ ˈbunovo]) is the rocky peak rising to 1104 m in the west foothills of Hemimont Plateau on Fallières Coast in Graham Land, Antarctica. It surmounts Forbes Glacier to the north and Kom Glacier to the south.

The peak is named after the settlements of Bunovo in Western and Southwestern Bulgaria.

== Location ==
Bunovo Peak is located at 67°49′48″S 66°36′53″W, which is 18.2 km south-southwest of Shapkarev Buttress, 4.75 km north of Grozden Peak and 5.85 km east of Mount Diamond. British mapping in 1978.

== Maps ==
- Antarctic Digital Database (ADD). Scale 1:250000 topographic map of Antarctica. Scientific Committee on Antarctic Research (SCAR). Since 1993, regularly upgraded and updated.
- British Antarctic Territory. Scale 1:200000 topographic map. DOS 610 Series, Sheet W 67 66. Directorate of Overseas Surveys, Tolworth, UK, 1978.
