= Glavinitsa Peak =

Mountain in the antarctica

Highest point
- Elevation: 1,585 m (5,200 ft)
- Prominence: 1,246 m (4,088 ft)
- Listing: Ribu

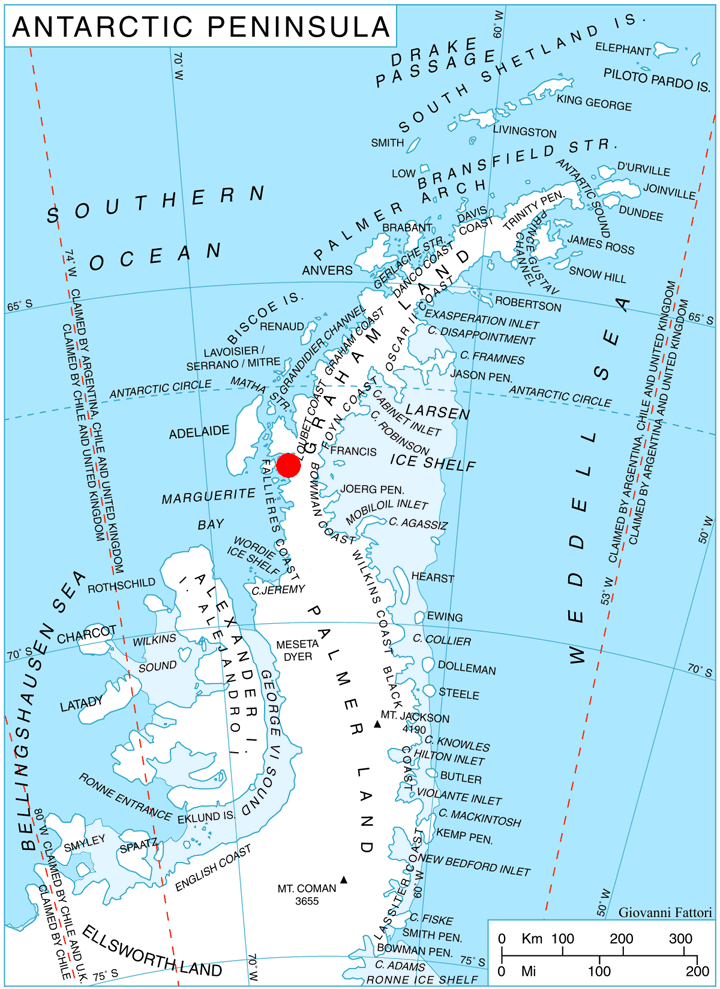
Location of German Peninsula in Graham Land, Antarctic Peninsula.

Glavinitsa Peak (Bulgarian: връх Главиница, romanized: vrah Glavinitsa, IPA: [ˈvrɤɣ ɡɫɐˈvinit͡sɐ]) is the peak rising to 1585 m in the central part of Rudozem Heights on German Peninsula, Fallières Coast in Graham Land, Antarctica. It has precipitous and partly ice-free northwest and south slopes, and is surmounting Bader Glacier to the north and Bucher Glacier to the southwest.

The peak is named after the town of Glavinitsa in Northeastern Bulgaria.

== Location ==
Glavinitsa Peak is located at 67°38′34″S 66°42′36″W, which is 12.84 km northeast of Bottrill Head and 6.71 km south-southeast of Thomson Head. British mapping in 1978.

== Maps ==
- British Antarctic Territory. Scale 1:200000 topographic map. DOS 610 Series, Sheet W 67 66. Directorate of Overseas Surveys, Tolworth, UK, 1978.
- Antarctic Digital Database (ADD). Scale 1:250000 topographic map of Antarctica. Scientific Committee on Antarctic Research (SCAR), 1993–2016.
