= Grozden Peak =

Mountain in Antarctica

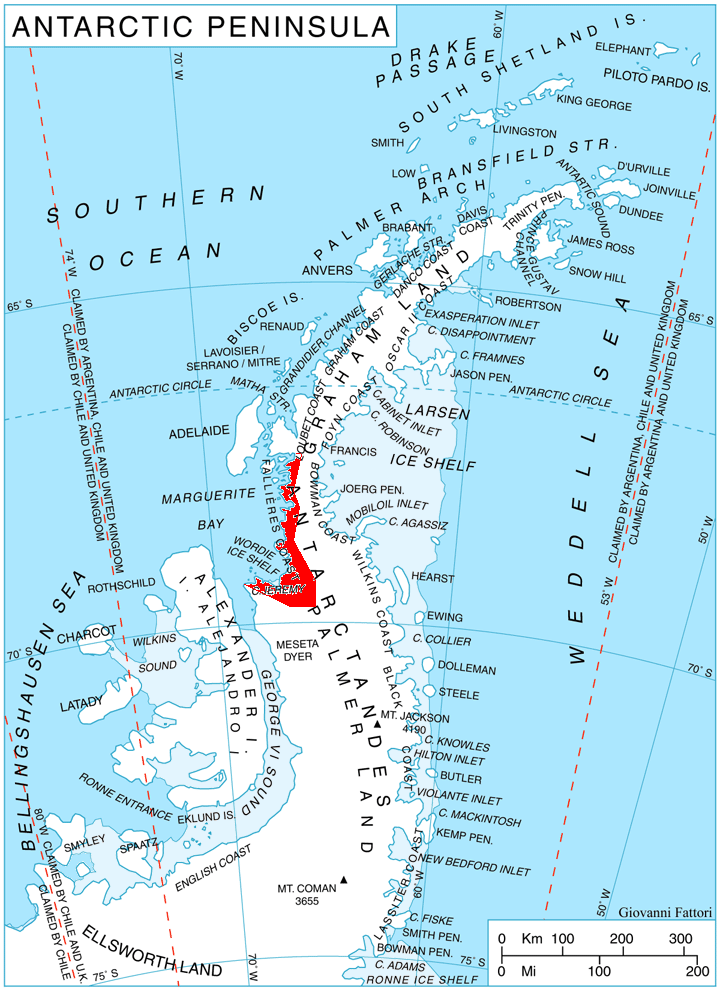
Location of Fallières Coast on the Antarctic Peninsula.

Grozden Peak (Bulgarian: връх Грозден, romanized: vrah Grozden, IPA: [ˈvrɤɣ ˈɡrɔzdɛn]) is the rocky peak rising to 1193 m in the west foothills of Hemimont Plateau on Fallières Coast in Graham Land, Antarctica. It surmounts Kom Glacier and its tributaries to the south, west and north.

The peak is named after the settlement of Grozden in Southeastern Bulgaria.

== Location ==
Grozden Peak is located at 67°52′20″S 66°36′30″W, which is 4.75 km south of Bunovo Peak, 8 km northeast of Zhefarovich Crag and 6.7 km east of Mercury Ridge. British mapping in 1978.

== Maps ==
- Antarctic Digital Database (ADD). Scale 1:250000 topographic map of Antarctica. Scientific Committee on Antarctic Research (SCAR). Since 1993, regularly upgraded and updated.
- British Antarctic Territory. Scale 1:200000 topographic map. DOS 610 Series, Sheet W 67 66. Directorate of Overseas Surveys, Tolworth, UK, 1978.
