= Zhefarovich Crag =

Rocky Peak

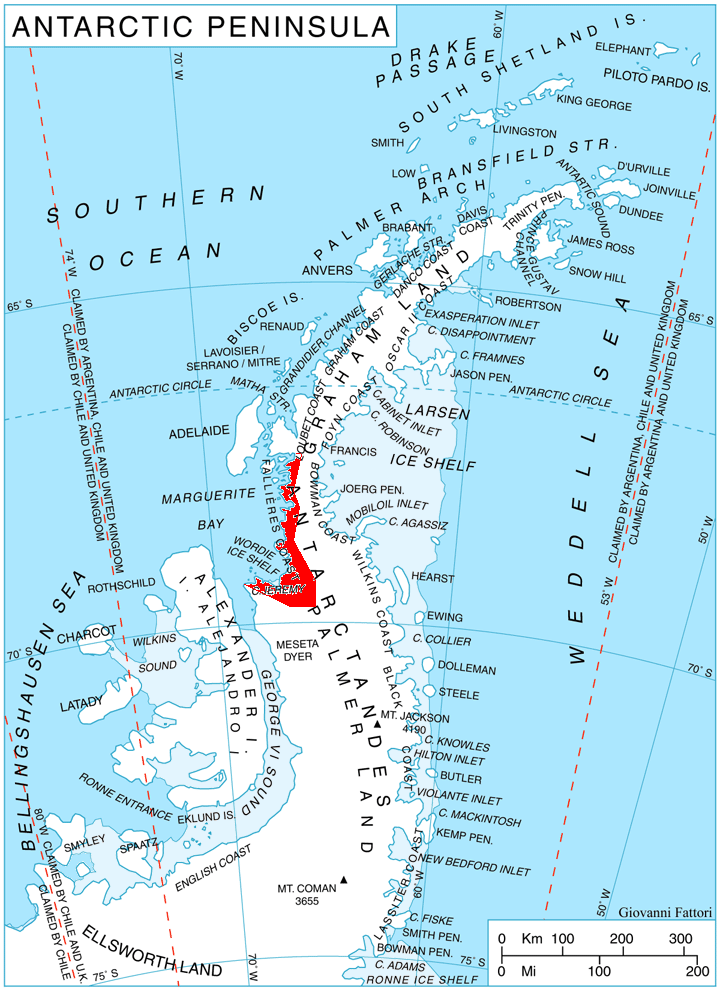
Location of Fallières Coast on the Antarctic Peninsula.

Zhefarovich Crag (Bulgarian: Жефарович камък, ‘Zhefarovich Kamak’ \zhe-'fa-ro-vich 'ka-m&k\) is the sharp rocky peak rising to 1015 m in the west foothills of Hemimont Plateau on Fallières Coast in Graham Land, Antarctica. It surmounts Swithinbank Glacier to the southwest and Kom Glacier to the north.

The peak is named "after the Bulgarian and Serbian painter, engraver, writer and poet Hristofor Zhefarovich (1690–1753)."

== Location ==
Zhefarovich Crag is located at 67°55′55″S 66°42′44″W, which is 8 km southwest of Grozden Peak, 5.4 km north-northeast of Specimen Nunatak and 9.45 km east of Mount Wilcox. British mapping in 1978.

== Maps ==
- Antarctic Digital Database (ADD). Scale 1:250000 topographic map of Antarctica. Scientific Committee on Antarctic Research (SCAR). Since 1993, regularly upgraded and updated.
- British Antarctic Territory. Scale 1:200000 topographic map. DOS 610 Series, Sheet W 67 66. Directorate of Overseas Surveys, Tolworth, UK, 1978.
