= Bucher Glacier =

Glacier in Antarctica

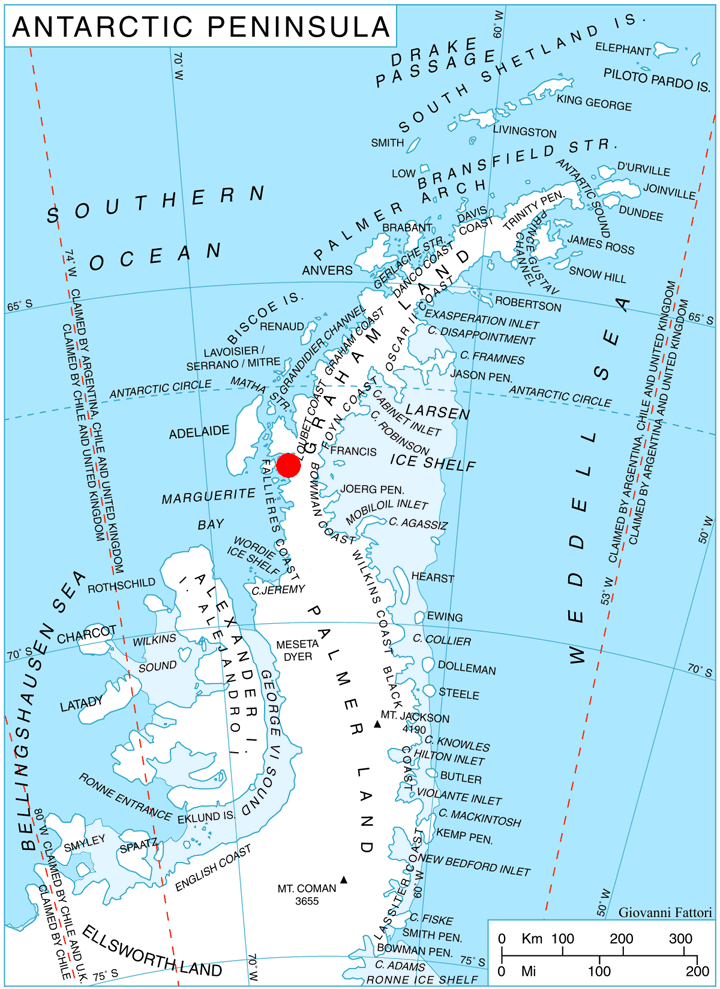
- Location of German Peninsula in Graham Land, Antarctic Peninsula

- Location within Antarctica
- Location: Graham Land
- Coordinates: 67°39′00″S 66°50′00″W
- Thickness: unknown
- Highest elevation: 633 m (2,077 ft)
- Terminus: Bourgeois Fjord
- Status: unknown

Bucher Glacier (67°39′S 66°50′W) is a small glacier draining the west slopes of Rudozem Heights and flowing to Bourgeois Fjord just north of Bottrill Head on the German Peninsula, Fallières Coast on the west side of Graham Land, Antarctica. It was named by the UK Antarctic Place-Names Committee in 1958 for Edwin Bucher, Swiss glaciologist and author of many publications on snow and avalanches.

== See also ==
- List of glaciers in the Antarctic
- Glaciology

== Map ==
- British Antarctic Territory. Scale 1:200000 topographic map. DOS 610 Series, Sheet W 67 66. Directorate of Overseas Surveys, Tolworth, UK, 1978.
