= Kom Glacier =

Glacier in Graham Land, Antarctica

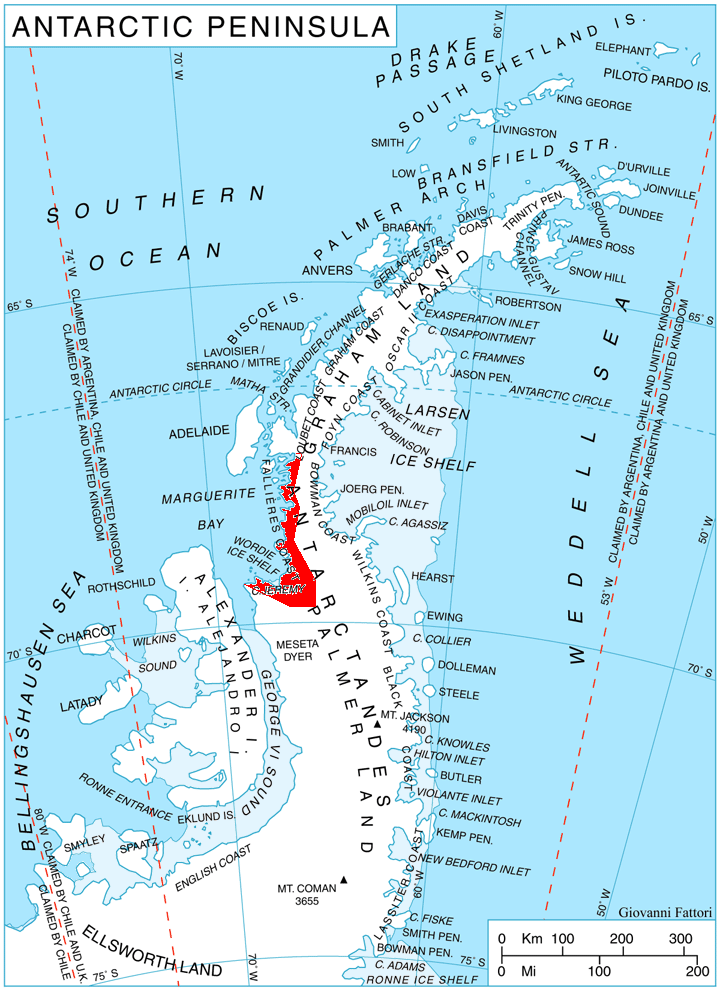
Location of Fallières Coast on the Antarctic Peninsula.

Kom Glacier (Bulgarian: ледник Ком, romanized: lednik Kom, IPA: [ˈlɛdnik ˈkɔm]) is the 10 km long and 8 km wide glacier on the west side of Hemimont Plateau, Fallières Coast in Graham Land, Antarctica. It is situated south of Forbes Glacier and north of Swithinbank Glacier, drains westwards between Mercury Ridge and Zhefarovich Crag, and flows into Square Bay next north of Swithinbank Glacier.

The glacier is named after Kom Peak in Western Balkan Mountains.

== Location ==
Kom Glacier is centred at 67°53′40″S 66°43′50″W. British mapping in 1978.

== Maps ==
- Antarctic Digital Database (ADD). Scale 1:250000 topographic map of Antarctica. Scientific Committee on Antarctic Research (SCAR). Since 1993, regularly upgraded and updated.
- British Antarctic Territory. Scale 1:200000 topographic map. DOS 610 Series, Sheet W 67 66. Directorate of Overseas Surveys, Tolworth, UK, 1978.
