= Kom Peak =

Peak in the western Balkan Mountains in Bulgaria

Kom Peak (връх Ком)
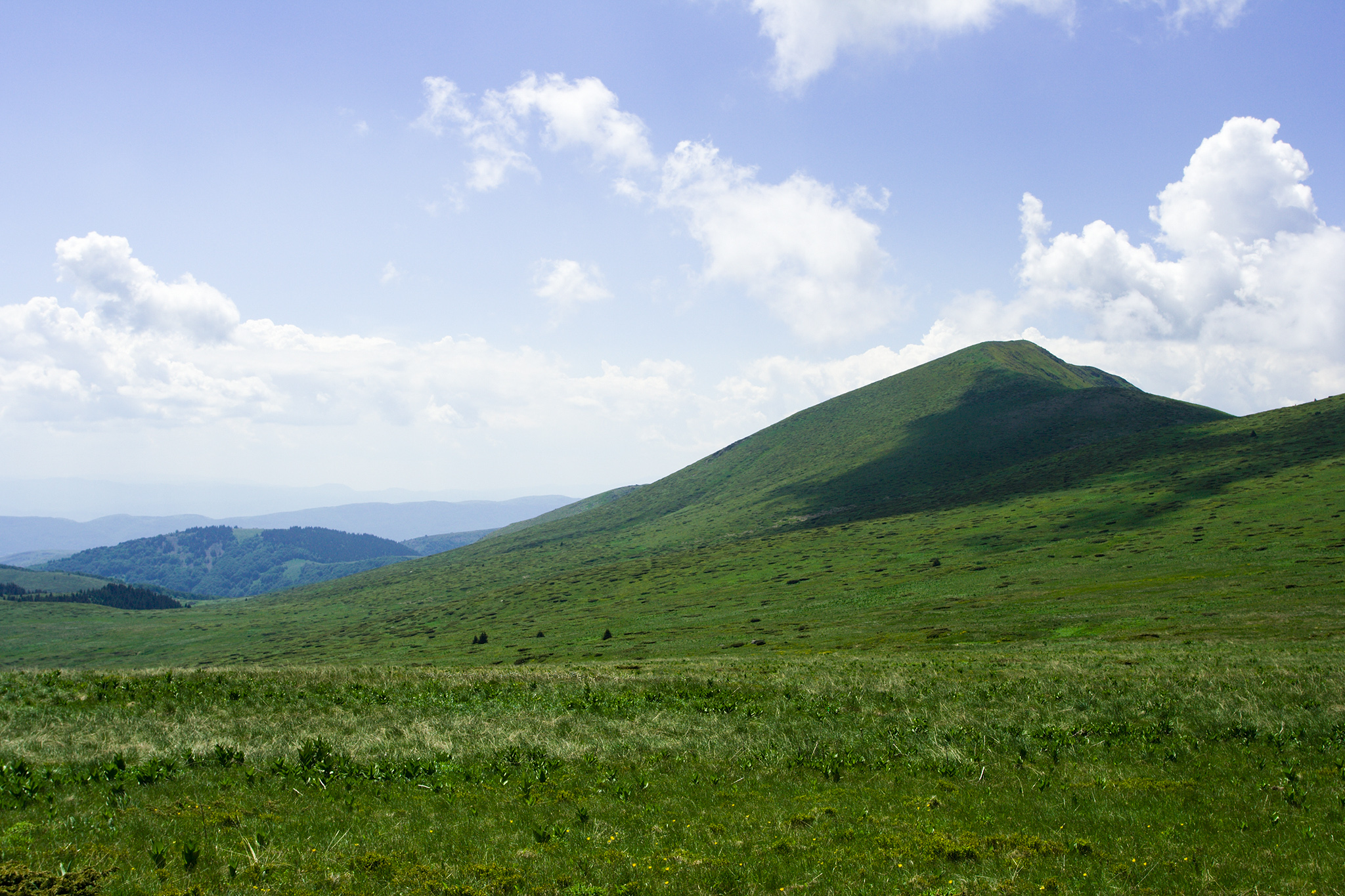
- Kom Peak

Highest point
- Elevation: 2,016 m (6,614 ft)
- Coordinates: 43°10′N 23°03′E

Geography
- Location within Bulgaria
- Location: south of Berkovitsa, Bulgaria
- Parent range: Balkan Mountains

Climbing
- Easiest route: a two-hour climb from Kom chalet

Kom Peak (Bulgarian: Ком [kɔm]) or Golyam Kom (Голям Ком, "Big Kom") is a peak in the western Balkan Mountains, located in western Bulgaria, not far from the Serbian border. The peak is 2,016 metres high and lies south of the town of Berkovitsa, of which it is a traditional symbol. Kom, along with the lower peaks Sreden Kom ("Middle Kom") and Malak Kom ("Little Kom") to the east, form a west–east elevation with a round grassy ridge, a steep rocky northern slope and a slant grassy southern slope. Looking north, one can see Berkovitsa and the surrounding fields, as well as Montana and the Ogosta Reservoir some 30 kilometres away.

The peak inspired national writer Ivan Vazov to create the poem On Kom. In his honour, a bas-relief plaque bearing his image and excerpts from the poem has been installed on the peak. Kom also marks the start of the Bulgarian section of the European walking route E3, also known as the Kom–Emine path along the main ridge of the Balkan Mountains, as well as the eponymous off-road race.

There are several climbing routes to the summit, such as from the Kom chalet (two-hour climb), from the Petrohan Pass (taking 3 hours 30 minutes to reach the peak), from the villages of Komshtitsa and Gintsi (3 hours away).

The Nishava River, a major tributary of the South Morava, originates east of Kom Peak, as does the Visochitsa. Along with Midzhur, Kom is among the highest and best known peaks of the western Balkan Mountains. A Bulgarian brand of mineral water is branded after Kom. The peak is part of the 100 Tourist Sites of Bulgaria, together with the museum of ethnography in Berkovitsa. There are several ski pistes descending from the peak.

== Honours ==
Kom Glacier on Fallières Coast, Antarctica is named after the peak.

== Interesting facts ==
- The impressive view from the top has inspired the writer Ivan Vazov to write the poem "На Ком". In his honor near the elevation at the top is a stone plate with the writer's relief and verses of "На Ком".
- From Mount Kom began the annual off road race "Ком – Емине".

== Gallery ==
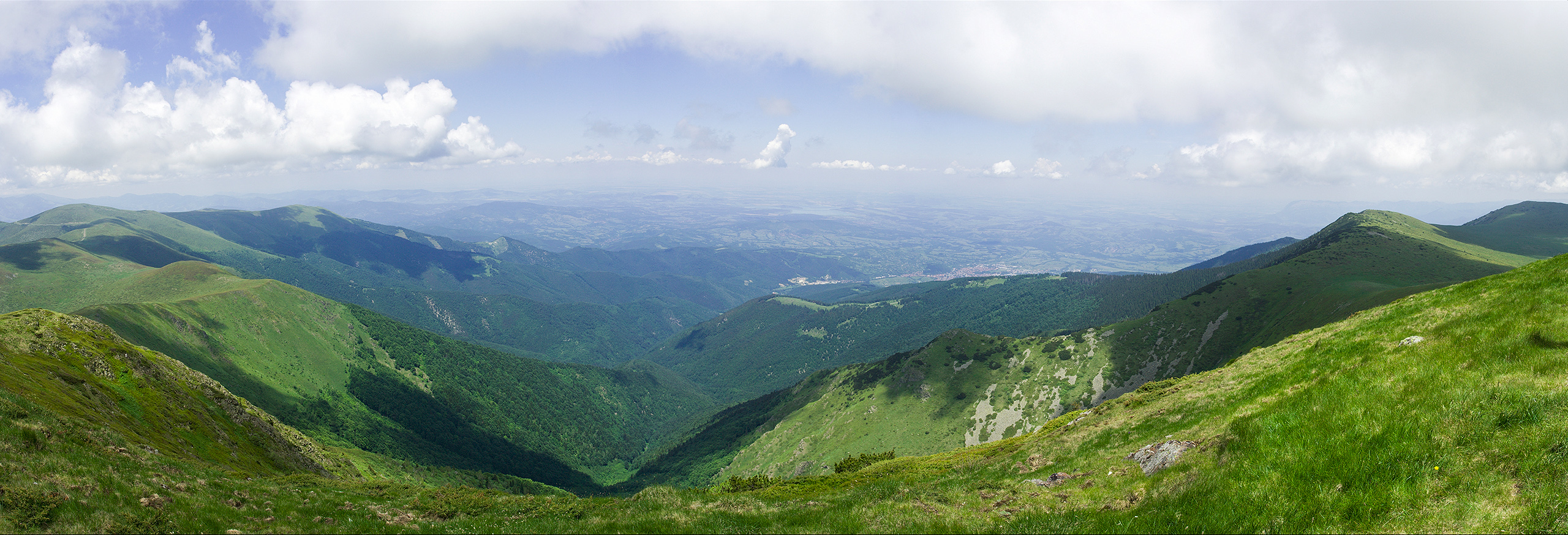
Panoramic view of the plains to the north looking from the peak

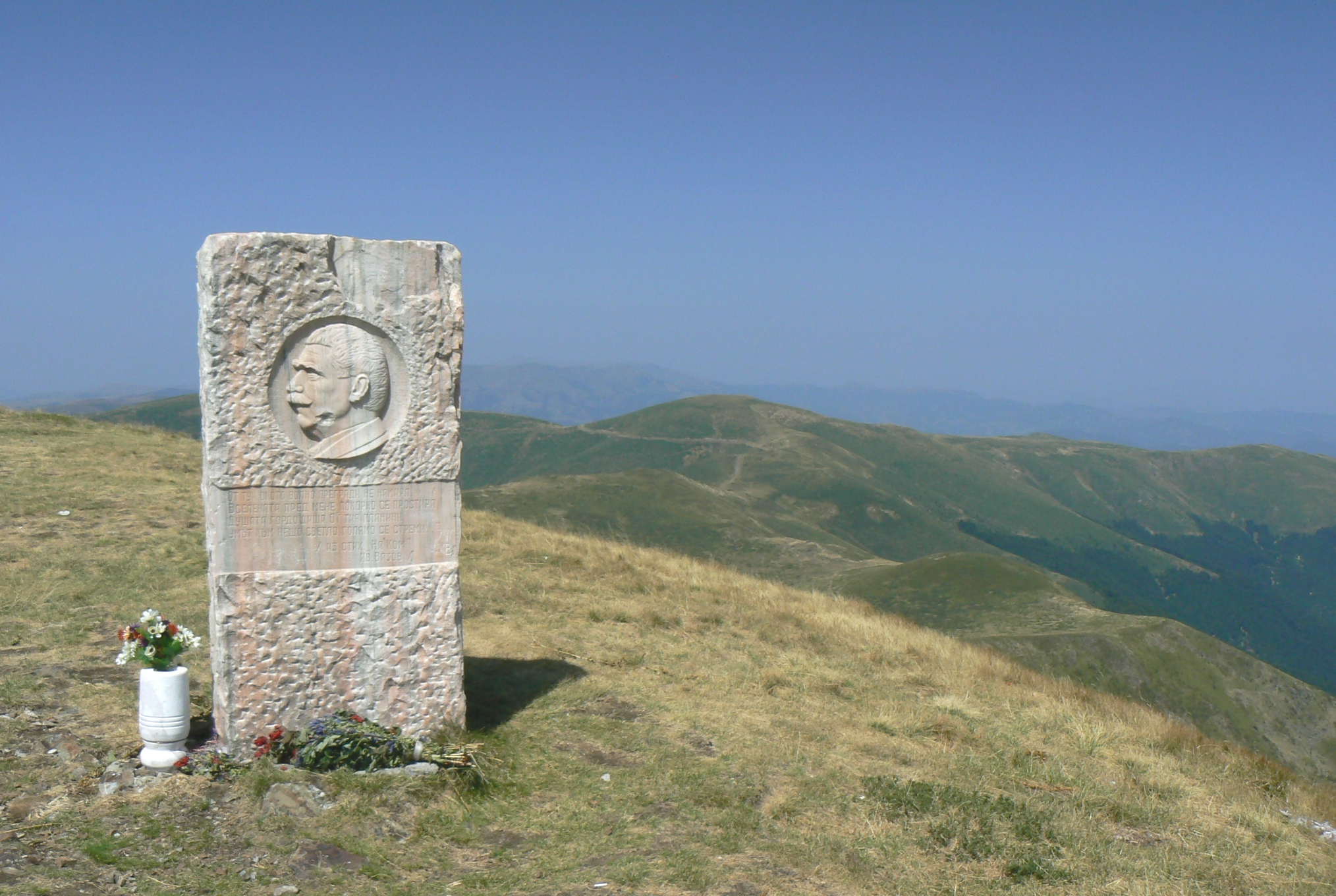
Bas-relief of Vazov on Kom

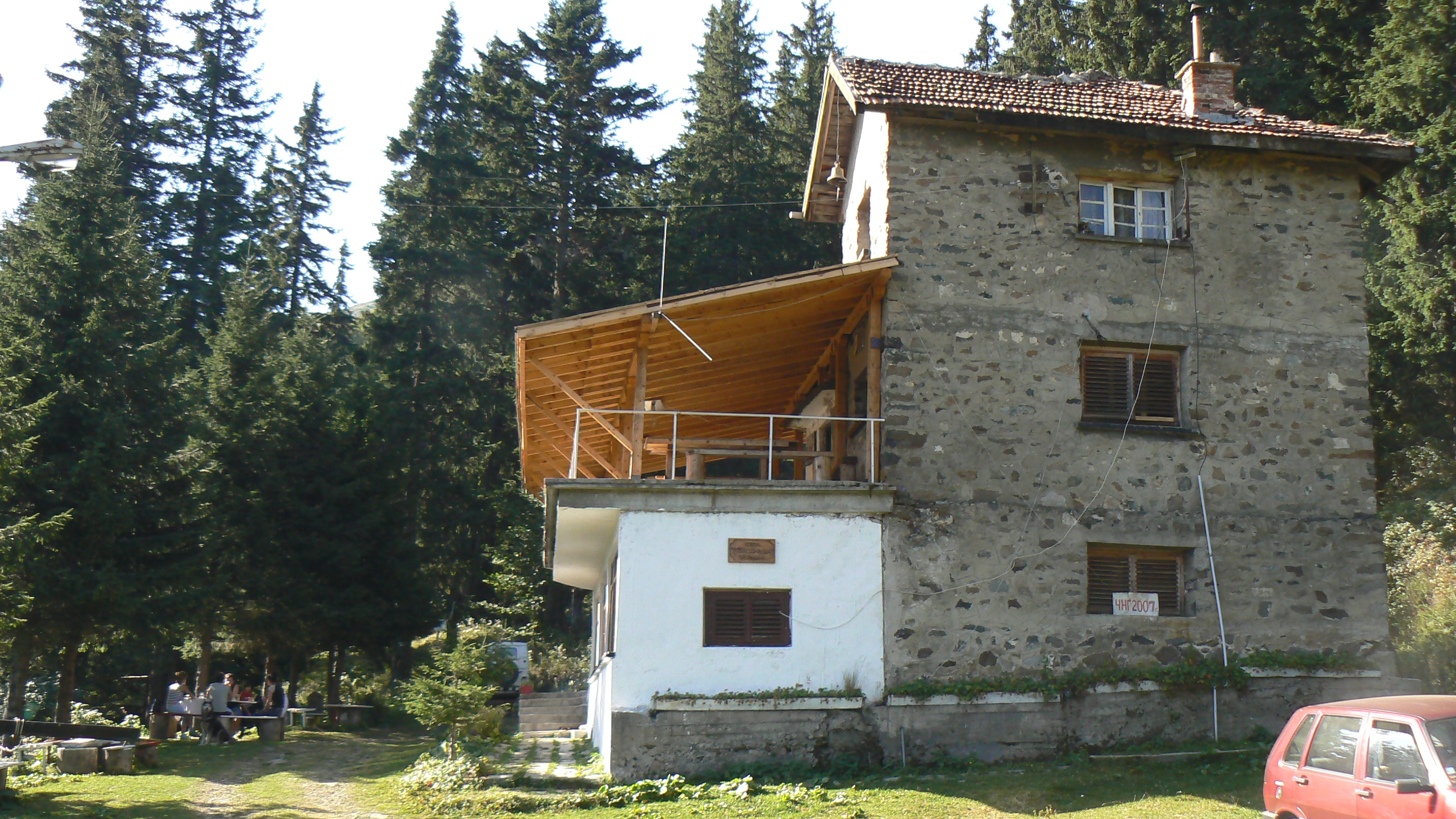
The old Kom chalet

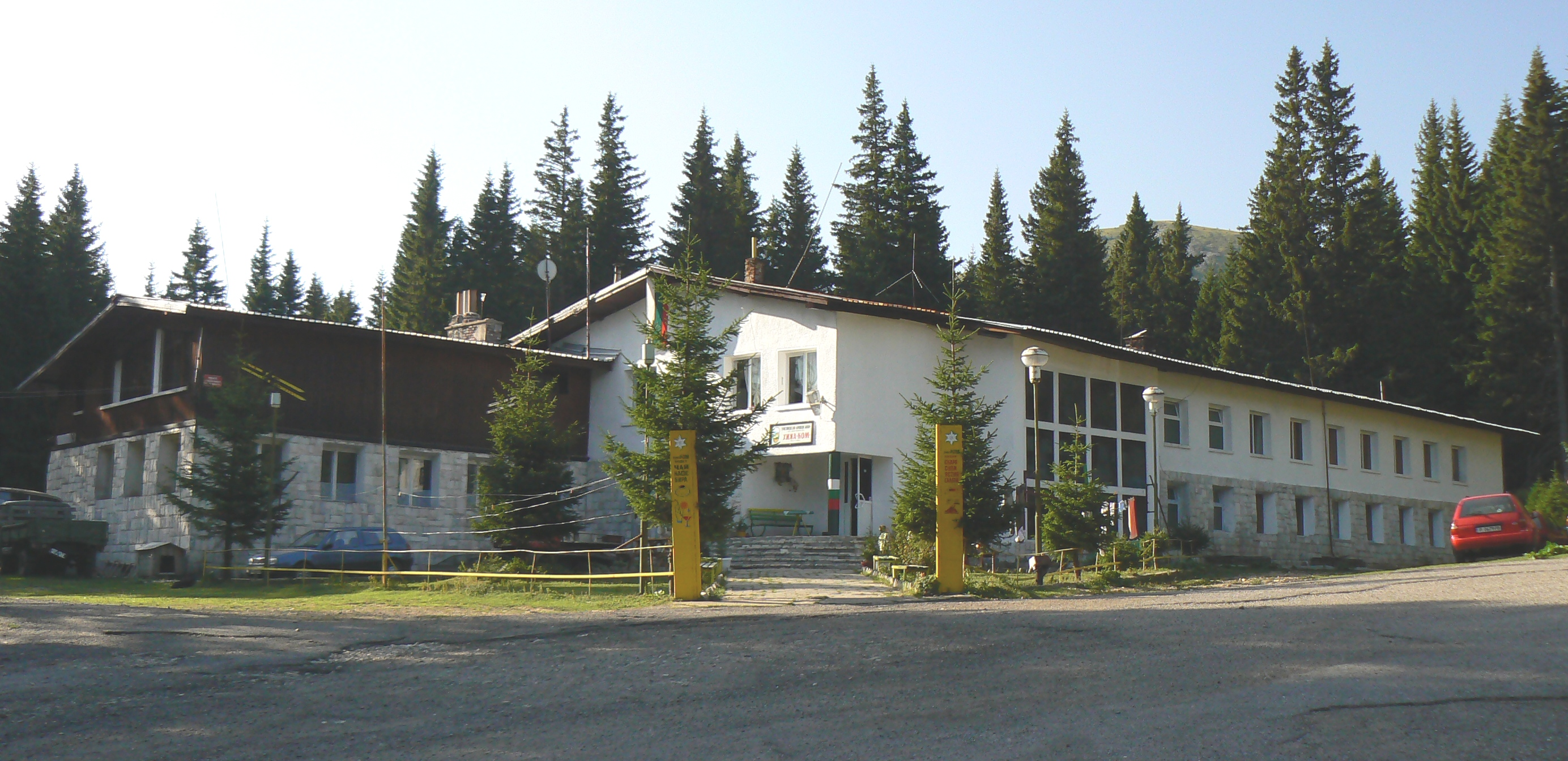
The new Kom chalet
