= Bottrill Head =

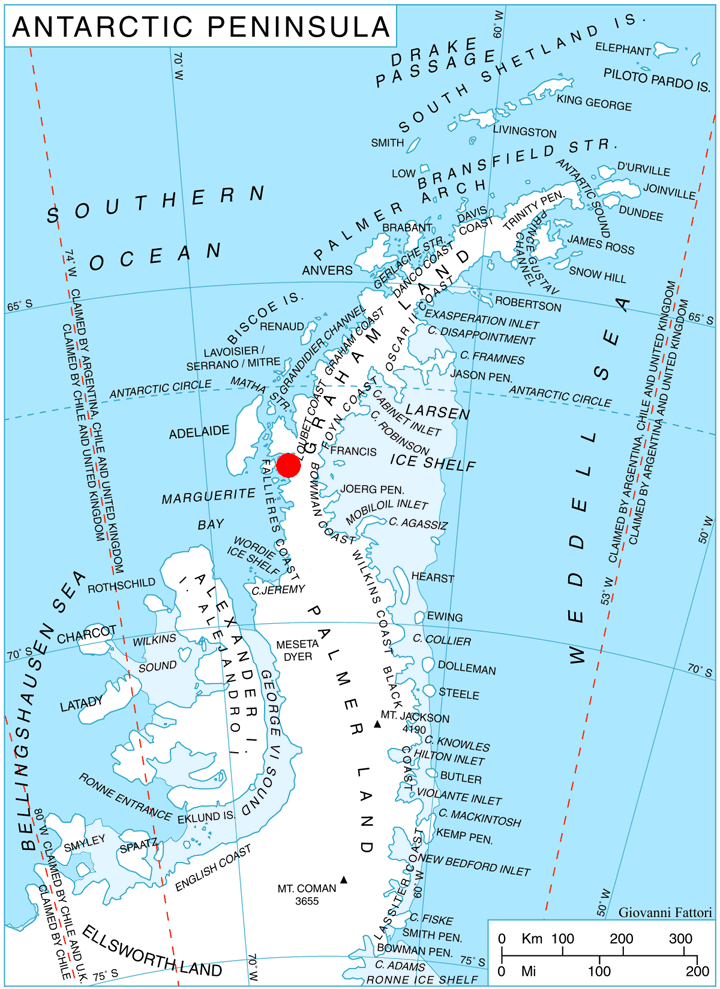
Location of German Peninsula in Graham Land, Antarctic Peninsula.

Bottrill Head (67°42′S 66°57′W) is a rugged headland on the east side of Bourgeois Fjord which forms the southwest extremity of German Peninsula and the north side of the entrance to Dogs Leg Fjord in Fallières Coast, on the west side of Graham Land, Antarctica. It was first surveyed in 1936 by the British Graham Land Expedition (BGLE) under John Rymill. The headland was resurveyed in 1948 by the Falkland Islands Dependencies Survey (FIDS) who named it for Harold Bottrill, chairman of the board of directors, later general manager, of Maclean and Stapledon S.A., shipping agents at Montevideo, who gave great assistance to the BGLE, 1934–37, and to FIDS, 1943–48.

== Map ==
- British Antarctic Territory. Scale 1:200000 topographic map. DOS 610 Series, Sheet W 67 66. Directorate of Overseas Surveys, Tolworth, UK, 1978.
