= Dipyramid (Alaska) =

Pair of mountain peaks in Juneau, Alaska

- Location within Alaska

Highest point
- Elevation: 6,073 ft (1,851 m)
- Coordinates: 58°45′51″N 134°06′58″W

Geography
- Location: Juneau, Alaska, United States
- Parent range: Boundary Ranges
- Topo map: USGS Juneau D-1

Dipyramid is a pair of mountain peaks in Juneau City and Borough, Alaska, United States. It is a part of the Boundary Ranges of the Coast Mountains in western North America. The summit is 34 miles (55 km) north-northeast of the city of Juneau and 1 mile southeast of The Citadel. The peaks are 0.2 miles (322 m) apart.

Dipyramid was named by the Juneau Icefield Research Project in 1964, published by the United States Geological Survey in 1966, and entered into the Survey's Geographic Names Information System on January 1, 2000.

One of two August 1999 collections of seismic data on the nearby Demorest Glacier was conducted near Dipyramid.
