= Marvodol =

Marvodol Мърводол
- Village
- Location within Bulgaria
- Coordinates: 42.2317°N 22.9144°E
- Country: Bulgaria
- Province: Kyustendil Province
- Municipality: Nevestino
- Time zone: UTC+2 (EET)
  - Summer (DST): UTC+3 (EEST)

Marvodol is a village in Nevestino Municipality, Kyustendil Province, south-western Bulgaria.

== Honours ==
Marvodol Glacier on Fallières Coast, Antarctica is named after the village.
