= Nicholl Head =

Nicholl Head (67°47′S 67°6′W) is a bold west extremity of the ridge separating Dogs Leg Fjord and Square Bay, on the west coast of Graham Land, Antarctica. First surveyed in 1936 by the British Graham Land Expedition (BGLE) under Rymill. Resurveyed in 1948 by the Falkland Islands Dependencies Survey (FIDS) and named for Timothy M. Nicholl, FIDS base leader at the Argentine Islands in 1948 and 1949.
