= Bader Glacier =

Glacier in Antarctica

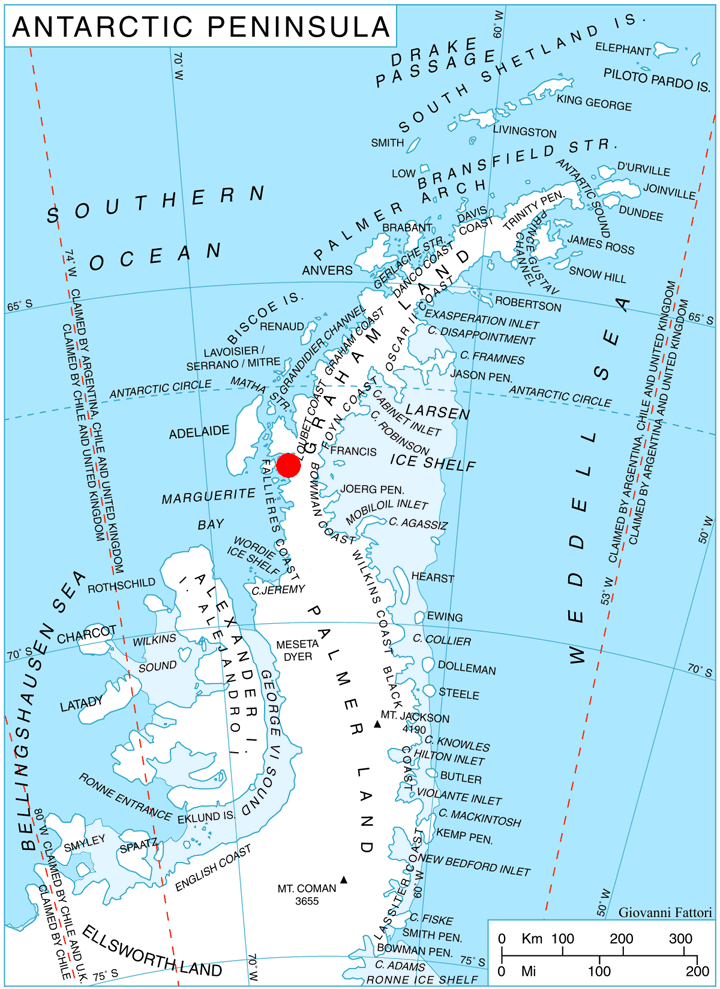
- Location of German Peninsula in Graham Land, Antarctic Peninsula

- Location within Antarctica
- Location: German Peninsula
- Coordinates: 63°37′S 66°45′W
- Thickness: unknown
- Highest elevation: 574 m (1,883 ft)
- Terminus: Bourgeois Fjord
- Status: unknown

Bader Glacier (67°37′S 66°45′W) is a small glacier draining the west slopes of Rudozem Heights and flowing to Bourgeois Fjord just south of Thomson Head on German Peninsula, Fallières Coast on the west side of Graham Land, Antarctica.

== History ==
It was named by the UK Antarctic Place-Names Committee in 1958 for Swiss glaciologist Henri Bader of Rutgers University (U.S.), author of an important thesis on the development of the snowflake and its metamorphoses.

== See also ==
- List of glaciers in the Antarctic
- Glaciology

== Map ==
- British Antarctic Territory. Scale 1:200000 topographic map. DOS 610 Series, Sheet W 67 66. Directorate of Overseas Surveys, Tolworth, UK, 1978.
