= Perutz Glacier =

Glacier in Antarctica

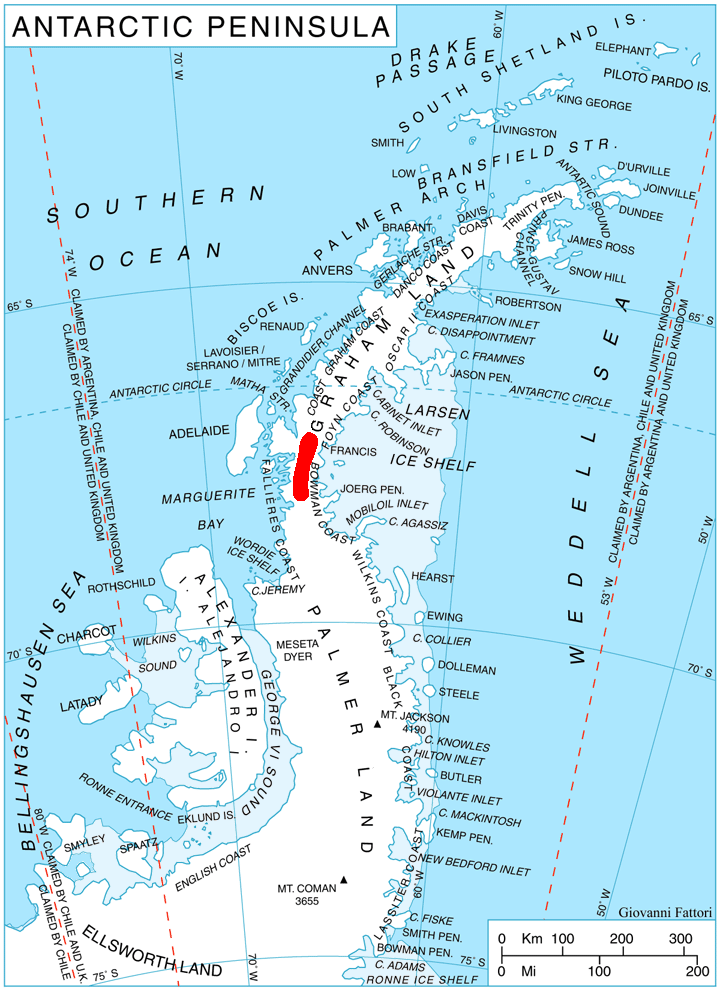
Location of Hemimont Plateau on the Antarctic Peninsula.

Perutz Glacier (67°36′S 66°33′W) is a glacier, 10 nautical miles (18 km) long and 2 nautical miles (3.7 km) wide, which flows west-northwest from Hemimont Plateau into Bourgeois Fjord, close east of Thomson Head, on the west coast of Graham Land, Antarctica. The mouth of the glacier was first surveyed in 1936 by the British Graham Land Expedition (BGLE) under Rymill. The entire glacier was surveyed in 1946-47 and 1948-49 by the Falkland Islands Dependencies Survey (FIDS), and named by them for Max F. Perutz of the Cavendish Laboratory, Cambridge, who has made important studies on the mechanism of glacier flow.

== See also ==
- Bader Glacier
- Lliboutry Glacier
- Bourgeois Fjord
- Hemimont Plateau
- Fallières Coast
- List of glaciers in the Antarctic
