= Thomson Head =

Headland in Antarctica

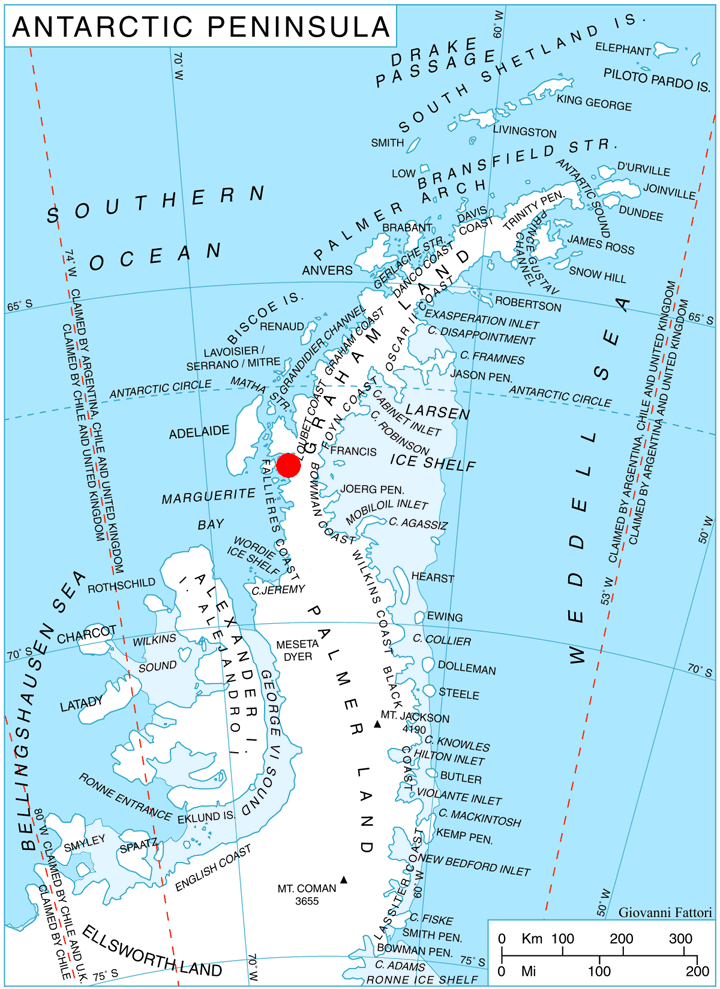
Location of German Peninsula in Graham Land, Antarctic Peninsula.

Thomson Head (67°35′S 66°46′W) is a headland rising to 915 m at the cola side of Bourgeois Fjord, between Perutz and Bader Glaciers, forming the north extremity of German Peninsula on Fallières Coast on the west side of Graham Land, Antarctica. First surveyed in 1936 by the British Graham Land Expedition (BGLE) under Rymill. Resurveyed in 1948-49 by the Falkland Islands Dependencies Survey (FIDS) and named for William H. Thomson, FIDS air pilot at Stonington Island in 1947.

== Map ==
- British Antarctic Territory. Scale 1:200000 topographic map. DOS 610 Series, Sheet W 67 66. Directorate of Overseas Surveys, Tolworth, UK, 1978.
