= Cape Emine =

Headland at the Bulgarian Black Sea Coast

- Cape
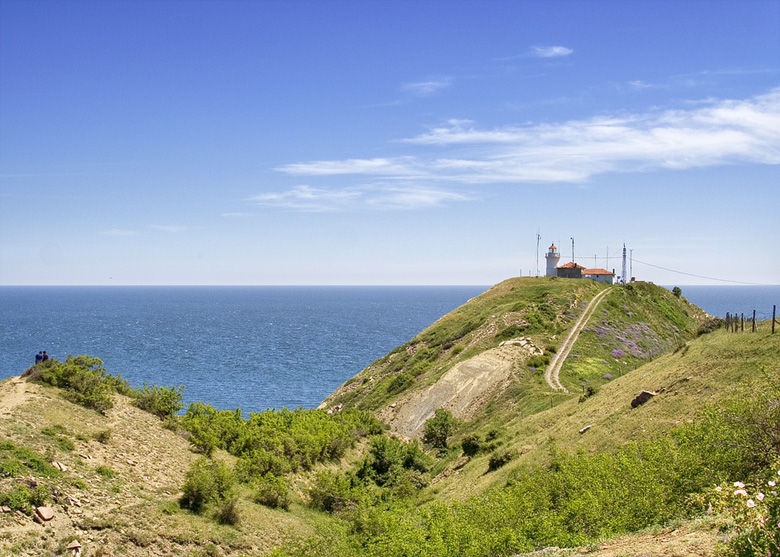

- Location within Bulgaria
- Coordinates: 42°42′05″N 27°53′59″E
- Elevation: 15 m (49 ft)

Cape Emine (Bulgarian: Нос Емине [ˈnɔs ˈɛminɛ]) is a headland located at the Bulgarian Black Sea Coast. It is located 79 kilometres (49 mi) south of Varna, 55 km (34 mi) north of Burgas and 14 km (9 mi) south of Obzor. It forms the tip of Stara Planina. Cape Emine is said to be Bulgaria's stormiest cape.

In the Middle Ages, there was a fortress called Emona on Cape Emine. Its name was derived from Aemon, the ancient name for Stara Planina. Nowadays, only some ruins of the fortress are left. There are also remnants of a monastery and a lighthouse. The village of Emona is located nearby.

Cape Emine is the endpoint of the European walking route E3 (its Bulgarian section is also known as "Kom–Emine").

== Gallery ==
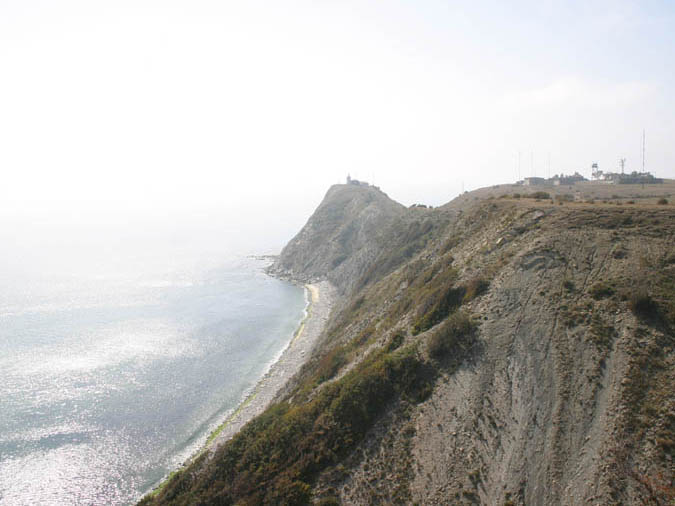
''Cape Emine'' - Bulgaria
