= Ridge Island =

Island in Graham Land, Antarctica

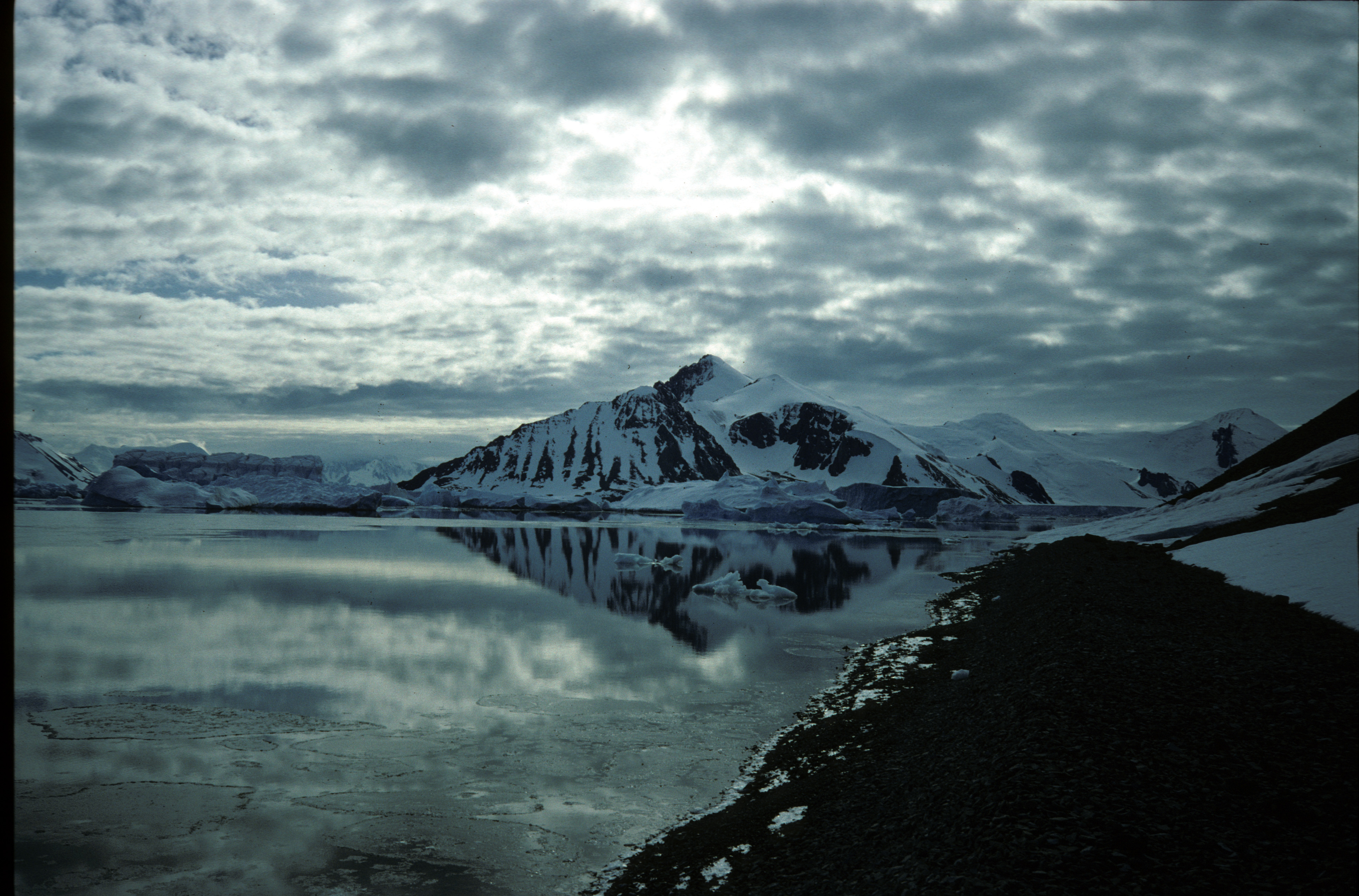
View of Ridge Island from Horseshoe Island

Ridge Island (67°42′S 67°6′W) is a ridge-shaped island, 6 nautical miles (11 km) long and 1.5 nautical miles (2.8 km) wide lying 3 nautical miles (6 km) east of Pourquoi Pas Island in the center of Bourgeois Fjord, off the west coast of Graham Land. Discovered and named by the British Graham Land Expedition (BGLE), 1934–37, under Rymill.

== See also ==
- List of Antarctic and sub-Antarctic islands
