= Werenskiold Bastion =

Werenskiold Bastion (67°26′S 65°32′W) is a bold rock headland that rises very steeply to over 1,000 m and forms the coastline between Demorest Glacier and Matthes Glacier on the east coast of Graham Land. The feature was observed and photographed by several American expeditions: United States Antarctic Service (USAS), 1939–41; Ronne Antarctic Research Expedition (RARE) 1947–48; U.S. Navy photos, 1968. Mapped by Falkland Islands Dependencies Survey (FIDS), 1947–48. Named by United Kingdom Antarctic Place-Names Committee (UK-APC) for Werner Werenskiold (1883–1961), Norwegian geographer who worked on the theory of glacier flow.
