= Kom–Emine =

Hiking trail in Bulgaria

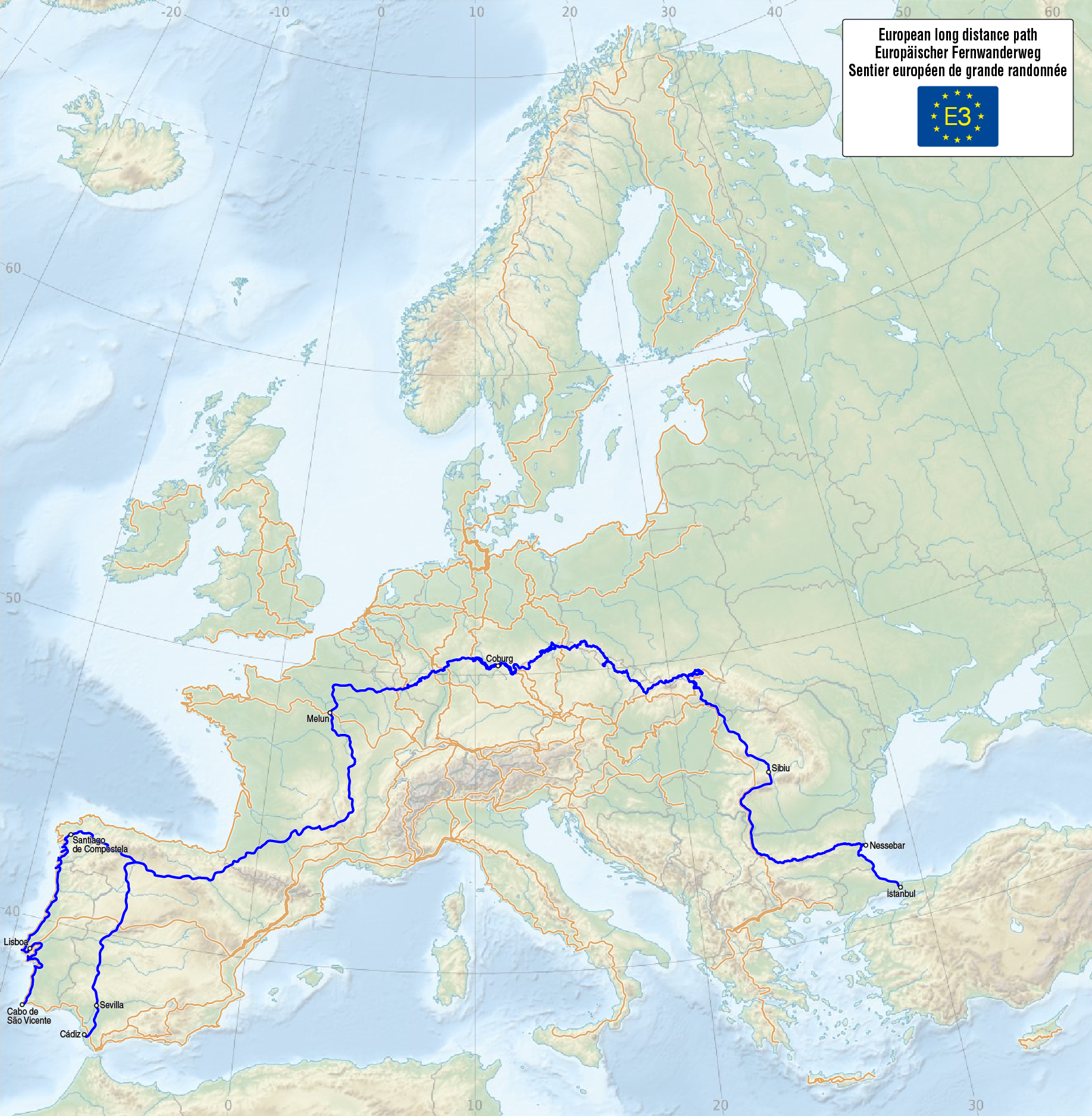
- Kom–Emine forms the Bulgarian section of the E3 European long distance path
- Length: 650 km (404 mi)
- Location: Balkan Mountains, Bulgaria
- Highest point: Botev Peak, 2,376 m (7,795 ft)
- Lowest point: Cape Emine, 61 m (200 ft)

Kom–Emine (Bulgarian: „Ком – Емине“) is a high-mountain long-distance trail in Bulgaria. The route follows the main ridge of the Balkan Mountains, which bisect the country and give the Balkan Peninsula its name. Beginning at Kom Peak (2,016 m (6,614 ft)) in the west near the border with Serbia, Kom–Emine continues east for some 650 km (400 mi) until it reaches the Bulgarian Black Sea Coast at Cape Emine.

Due to its length and altitude, Kom–Emine counts among Europe's longest uninterrupted high-mountain trails; it is Bulgaria's longest, oldest and most famous hiking trail. Kom–Emine forms part of the wider E3 European long distance path.

The trail's average elevation is 735 m (2,411 ft). The middle section, Kom–Emine's highest, coincides with the Central Balkan National Park and regularly rises above 2,000 m (6,600 ft). The highest point of the trail is Botev Peak (2,376 m (7,795 ft)), which is also the highest summit of the Balkan Mountains. In total, around 100 individual peaks are either summited or circumvented.

Typically, the Kom–Emine hike takes 20 to 25 days to complete. The route is marked by white-red-white paint markings and around 30 mountain huts provide accommodation to hikers. Summer is the preferred season to walk Kom–Emine, though the lowest, eastern parts of the trail can get uncomfortably hot.

The trail was first successfully traversed in 1933 by the hiking pioneer Pavel Deliradev, though a route along the entire Balkan Mountains had already been conceived by writer Aleko Konstantinov, who was unable to embark on the hike before his assassination. The first mass through-hike was done in 1953 and the first winter crossing on ski followed in 1961. Bulgarian extreme runner Bozhidar Antonov holds the record for the fastest crossing of Kom–Emine. In August 2018, he completed the route in 4 days, 8 hours 37 minutes .

== Gallery ==
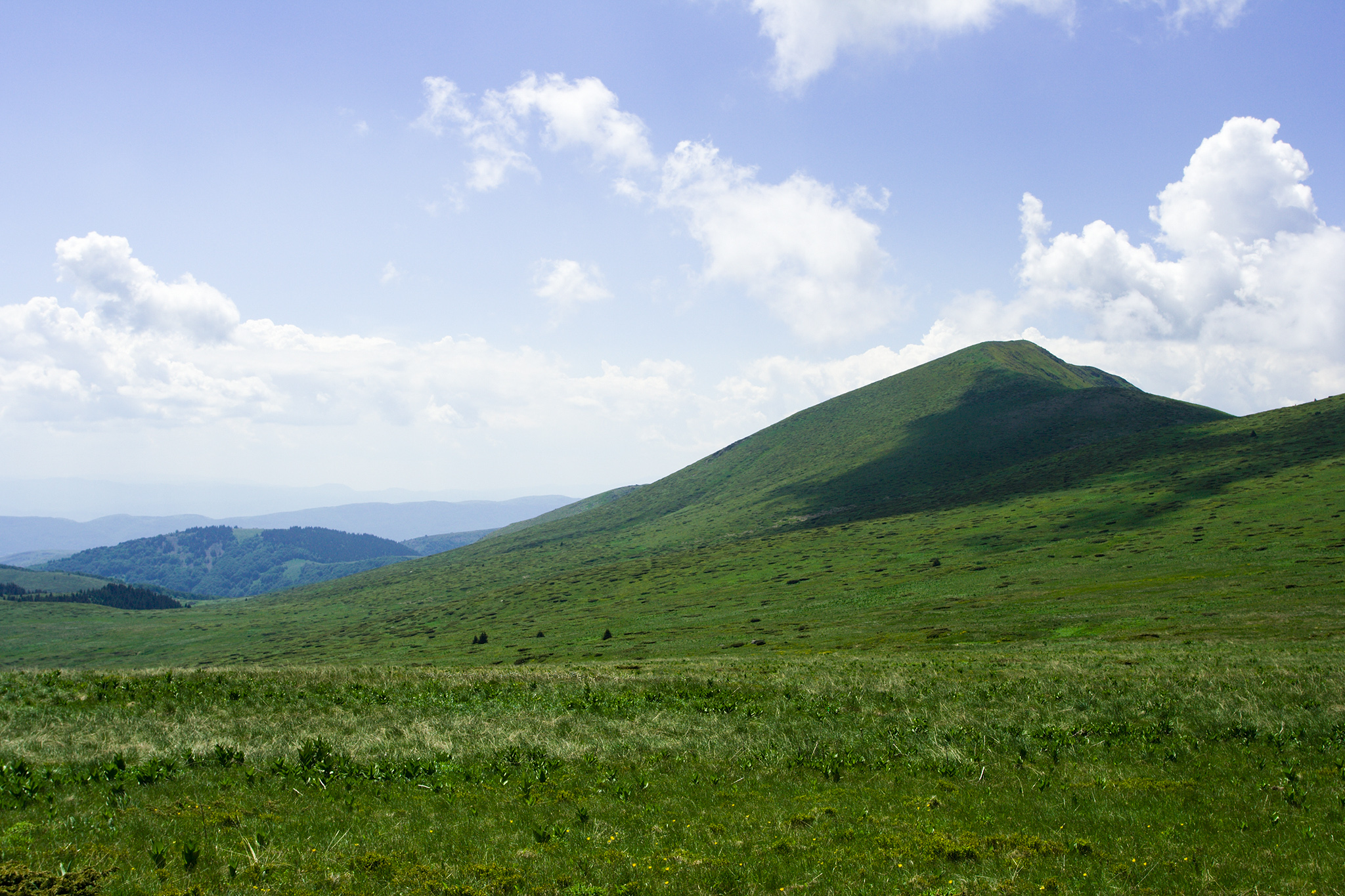
Kom Peak at Kom–Emine's western terminus

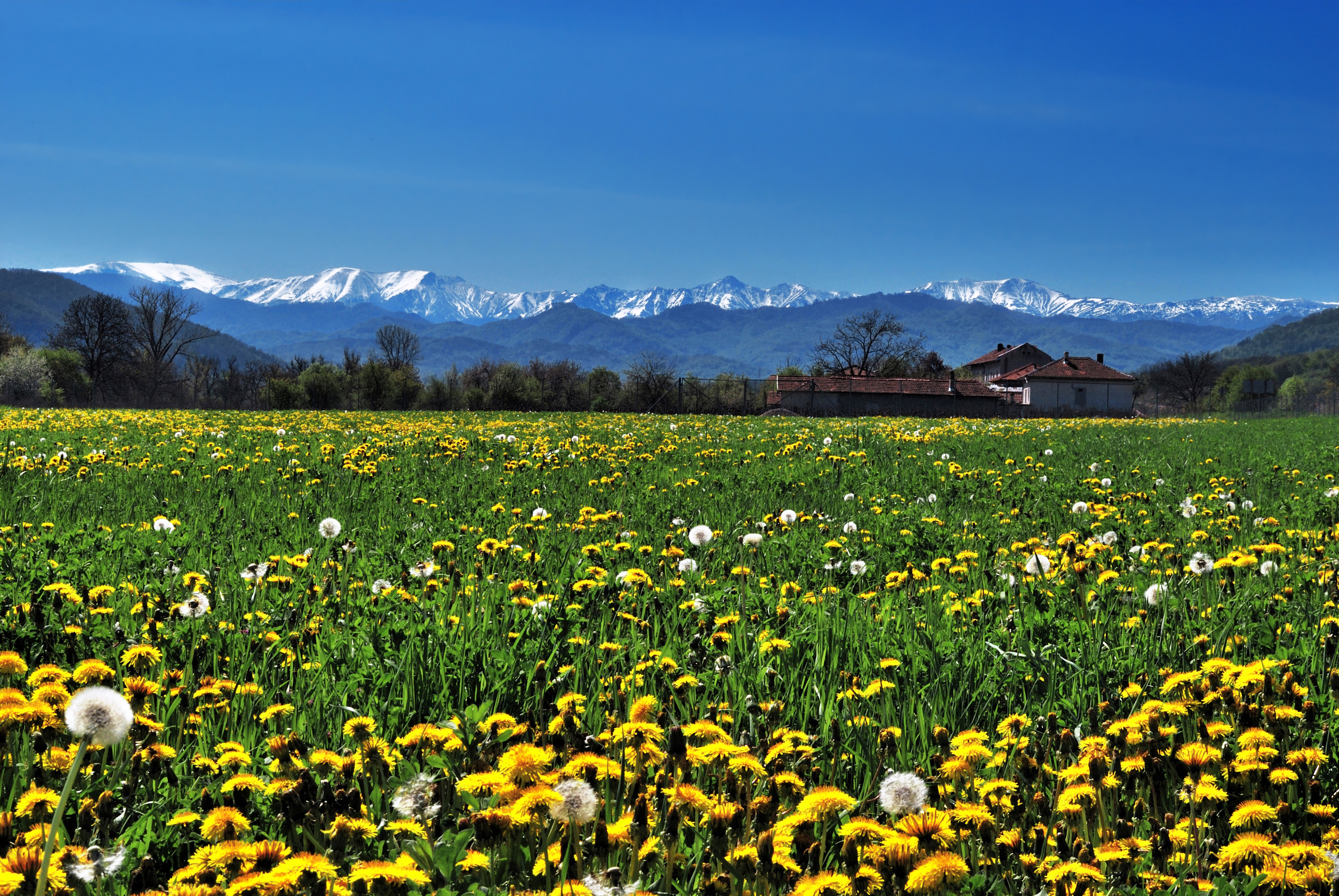
Kom–Emine follows the main ridge of the Balkan Mountains within the Central Balkan National Park

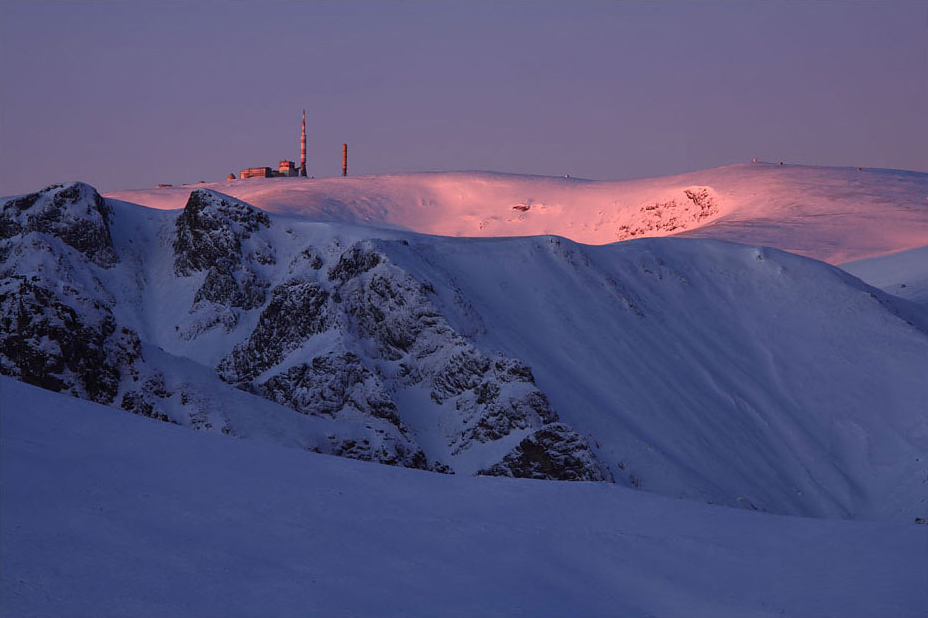
Botev Peak, Kom–Emine's highest point

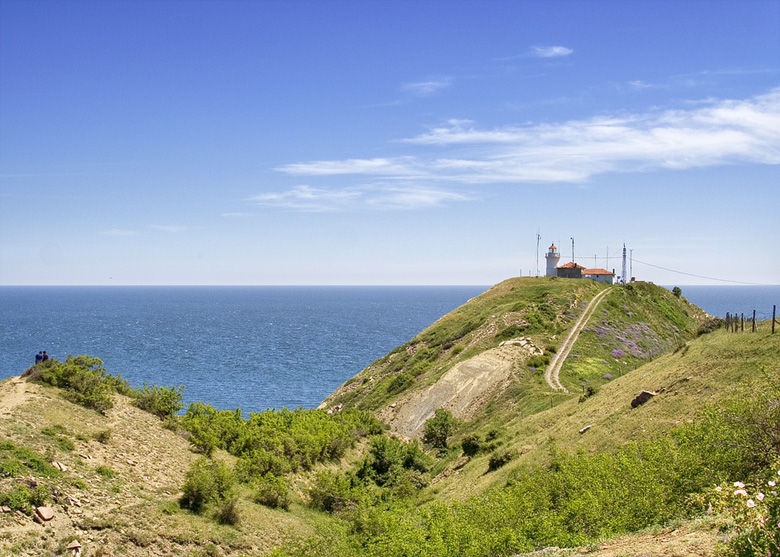
Cape Emine and the Black Sea at Kom–Emine's eastern terminus
