= Broken Island (Antarctica) =

Island of Antarctica

Broken Island (67°49′S 66°57′W) is an island 4.6 kilometres (2 1/2 nautical miles) long, lying 2.8 km (1 1/2 nmi) north of Centre Island in the north part of Square Bay, off the west coast of Graham Land. Discovered and named by the British Graham Land Expedition (BGLE) under Rymill, 1934–37.

== See also ==
- List of antarctic and sub-antarctic islands
