= Centre Island (Antarctica) =

Island in Antarctica

Centre Island (67°52′S 66°57′W) is an island 4 nautical miles (7 km) long and 2 nautical miles (3.7 km) wide, lying 1 nautical mile (1.9 km) south of Broken Island in the south part of Square Bay, off the west coast of Graham Land. Discovered and named by the British Graham Land Expedition (BGLE) under Rymill, 1934–37.

== See also ==
- List of antarctic and sub-antarctic islands
