= Krastets =

Krastets Кръстец
- Village
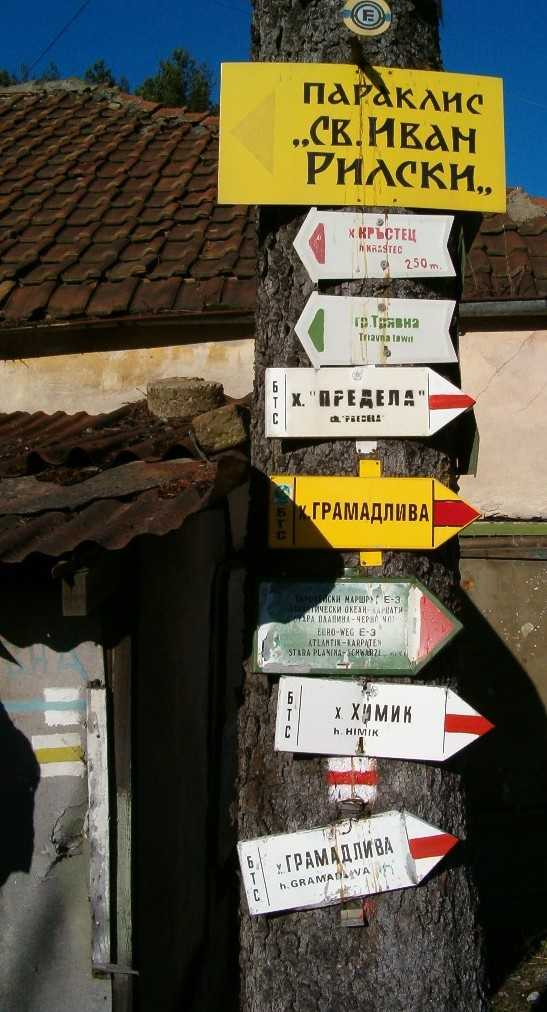
- Trail signage in Krustets

- Location within Bulgaria
- Coordinates: 42°46′N 25°34′E
- Country: Bulgaria
- Province: Gabrovo Province
- Municipality: Tryavna
- Elevation: 896 m (2,940 ft)
- Time zone: UTC+2 (EET)
  - Summer (DST): UTC+3 (EEST)

Krustets (Bulgarian: Кръстец [krɐsˈtɛt͡s]) is a village in Tryavna Municipality, in Gabrovo Province, in northern central Bulgaria. It is located at an elevation of around 900 metres (3,000 ft), not far from the summit of the Balkan Mountains. The long-distance Kom–Emine hiking trail passes by the village.
