= E3 European long distance path =

Walking path in Europe

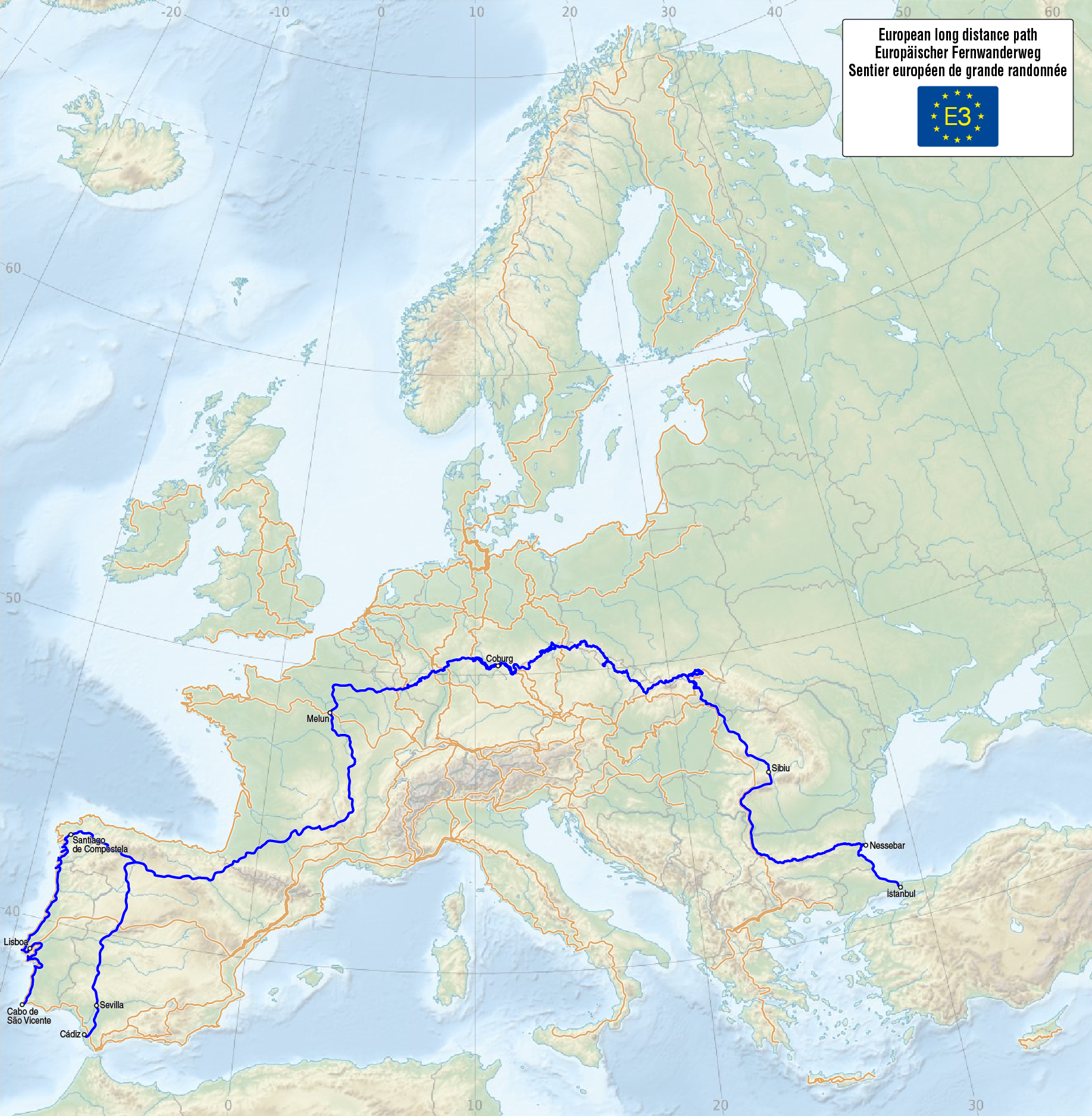
Full proposed Map of European long-distance paths E3

The E3 European long distance path, or just E3 path, is a 6,950-kilometre (4,320 mi) long-distance footpath that is planned to run from the Portuguese coast to the Black Sea in Bulgaria. It is part of the network of European long-distance paths.

== Route ==
The completed sections of the route pass through Spain, France, Luxembourg, Belgium, Germany, the Czech Republic, Slovakia, a short stretch in Poland, Hungary, Romania, Serbia and Bulgaria. It is planned to extend the route into Portugal, ending at Cape St. Vincent.

The currently marked route runs through the following places:

== Spain (96.4 km) ==
Main path start

- Zubiri — (Spain) / (France) border crossing (Mt. Txangoa)

== France (2004 km) ==
- (Spain) / (France) border crossing (Mt. Leitzarateka) — Saint-Jean-Pied-de-Port — Navarrenx — Aire-sur-l'Adour — Nogaro — Condom — Moissac — Cahors — Figeac — Decazeville — Conques — Aumont-Aubrac — Le-Puy-en-Velay — Retournac — Diou — Vezelay — Auxerre — Montargis — Nemours — Melun — Meaux — Senlis — Soissons — Monthermé — (France) / (Belgium) border crossing

== Belgium (181 km) ==
- (France) / (Belgium) border crossing — Bouillon — Florenville — Habay-la-Vieille — (Belgium) / (Luxembourg) Martelange border crossing

== Luxembourg (237 km) ==
- (Belgium) / (Luxembourg) Martelange border crossing — Wiltz — Clervaux — Vianden — Diekirch — Grevenmacher — (Luxembourg) / (Germany) Schengen border crossing

== Germany (1200.1 km) ==
- (Luxembourg) / (Germany) Schengen border crossing — Saarburg — Wiesbaden — Fulda — Milseburg summit (Hünfeld branch split) — Mellrichstadt — Coburg — Münchberg — Arzberg (Northern and Southern paths split)

Hünfeld dead-end branch

- Milseburg summit — Hünfeld — Hübelsberg summit

Northern path (Arzberg - Bad schandau)

- Arzberg — Selb — Oelsnitz — Annaberg-Buchholz — Olbernhau — Bad Schandau — (Germany) / (Czech Republic) Schmilka border crossing — Hřensko (rejoins with the Southern path)

== Czech Republic (741.6 km) ==
Southern path (Cheb - Děčín)

- (Germany) / (Czech Republic) Pomezí border crossing — Cheb — Loket — Karlovy Vary — Jáchymov — Hora Svaté Kateřiny — Děčín — Hřensko (rejoins with the Northern path)

Main path continuation

- Hřensko — Varnsdorf — Liberec — (Czech Republic) / (Poland) Harrachov border crossing
- (Poland) / (Czech Republic) Międzylesie border crossing — Králíky — Rýmařov — Nový Jičín — (Czech Republic) / (Slovakia) Makov border crossing

== Poland (479.2 km) ==
- (Czech Republic) / (Poland) Harrachov border crossing — Kamienna Góra — Wałbrzych — Bardo — (Poland) / (Czech Republic) Międzylesie border crossing
- (Slovakia) / (Poland) Makov border crossing — Zakopane — Szczawnica — Krynica-Zdrój — (Poland) / (Slovakia) Barwinek border crossing

== Slovakia (441.9 km) ==
- (Czech Republic) / (Slovakia) Makov border crossing — Bytča — Rajec — Trstená — (Slovakia) / (Poland) Suchá Hora border crossing
- (Poland) / (Slovakia) Barwinek border crossing — Mt. Minčol — Veľký Šariš — Prešov — Mt. Šimonka — (Slovakia) / (Hungary) Sátoraljaújhely border crossing

== Hungary (231.6 km) ==
- (Slovakia) / (Hungary) Sátoraljaújhely border crossing — Kisvárda — Nyírbátor — Debrecen — Létavértes — Nagykereki( — (Hungary) / (Romania) Biharkeresztes border crossing)

== Romania (499.6 km) ==
- (Hungary) / (Romania) Biharkeresztes border crossing — Oradea — Șuncuiuș — Brad — Llia — Băuțar — Caransebeș — Anina — Orșova — (Romania) / (Serbia) Novi Sip Danube border crossing

== Serbia (436.4 km) ==
- (Romania) / (Serbia) Novi Sip Danube border crossing — Kladovo — Brza Palanka — Negotin — Bogovina — Boljevac — Sokobanja — Knjaževac — Mt. Babin Zub — (Serbia) / (Bulgaria) Dimitrovgrad border crossing

== Bulgaria (551.2 km) ==
- Mt. Kom — Gara Lakatnik — Mt. Miale — Mt. Tetevenska baba — Mt. Vezhen — Botev Peak — Krastets — Kotel — Daskotna — Sveti Vlas — Cape Emine

Main path end

== Gallery ==
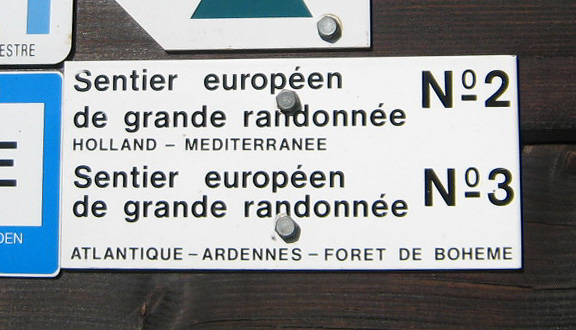
Sign on the path of the E3 near Vianden, Luxembourg.

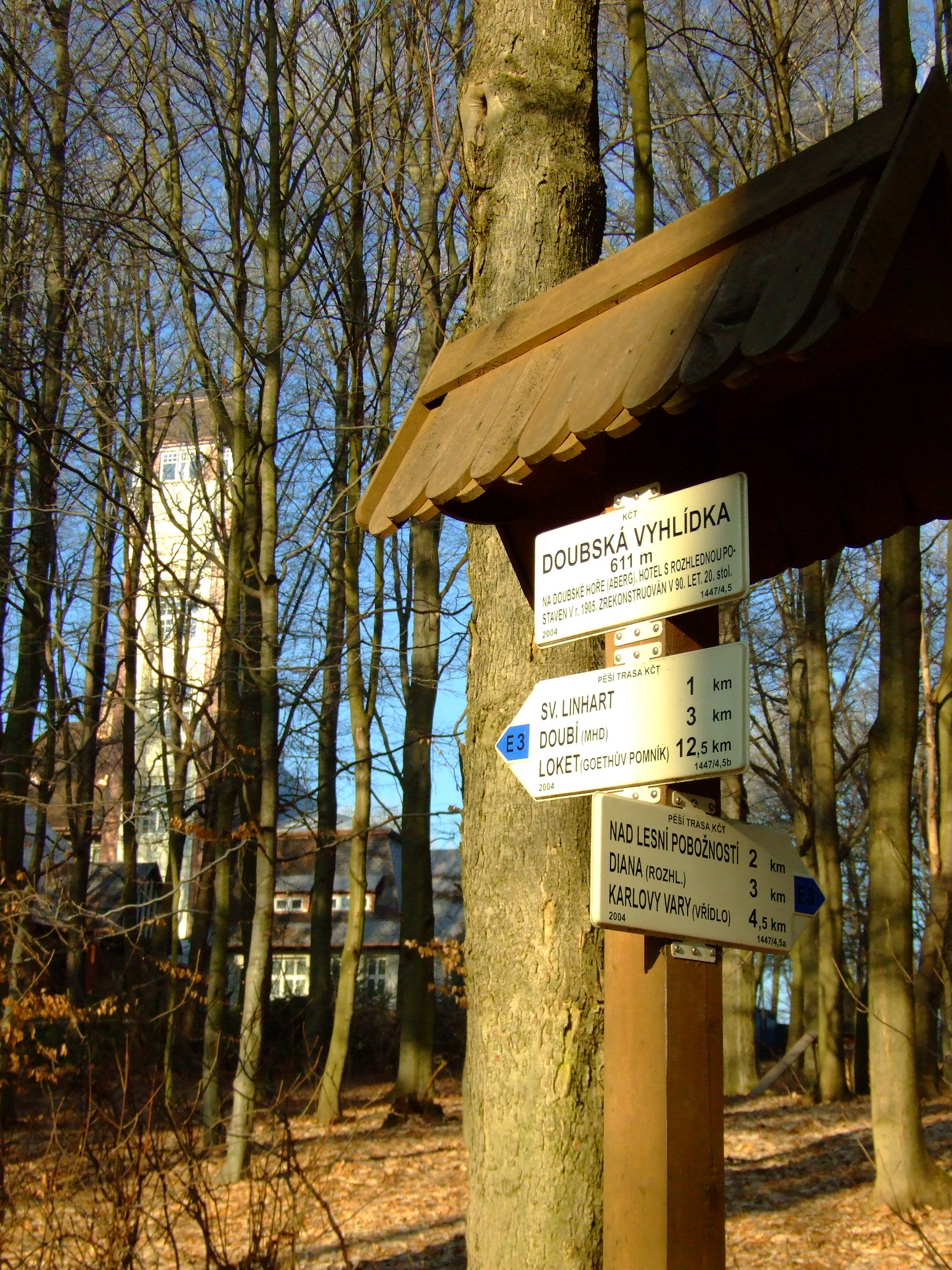
E3 as a part of the standard blue-marked path near Karlovy Vary, Czech Republic.

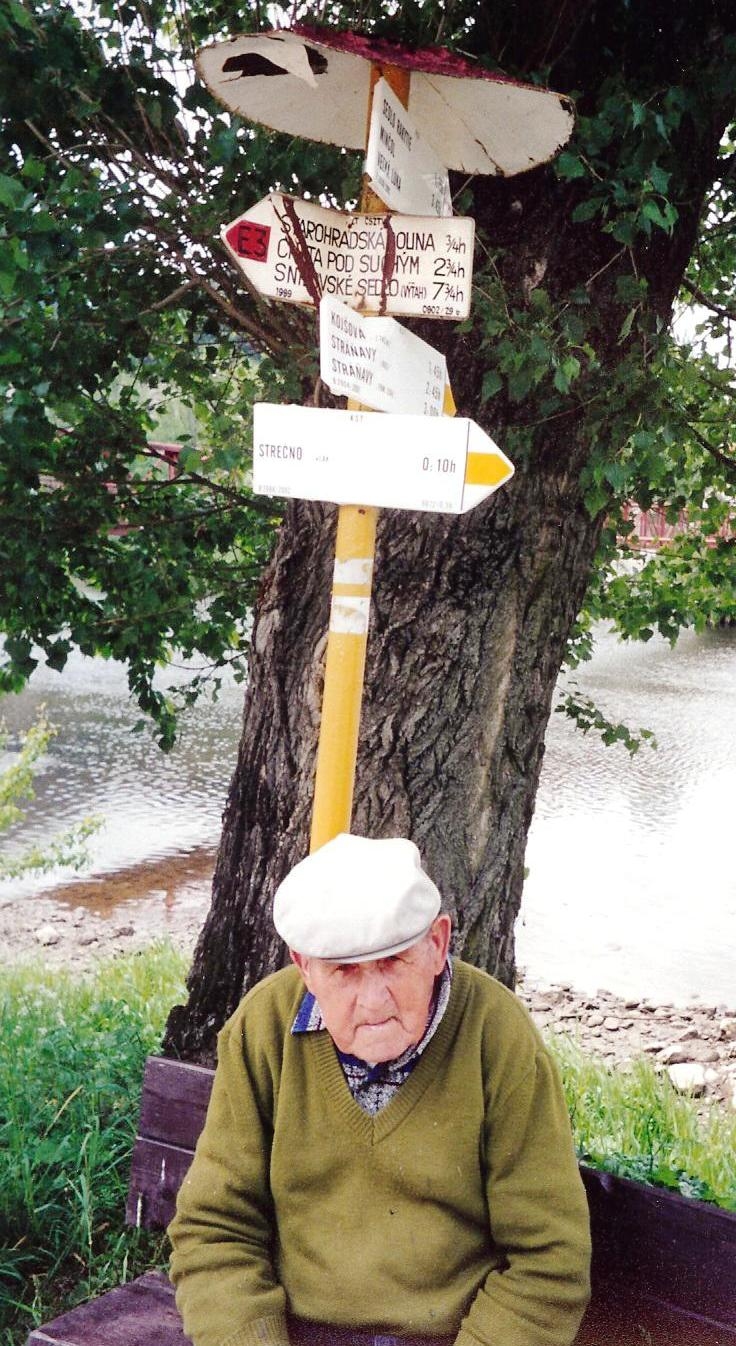
E3 at the west end of the Malá Fatra mountain range in northern Slovakia. The E3, E8, and other long-distance footpaths are marked in red on the Slovakia 1:50,000 "Turistika Mapa" / "Hiking maps".

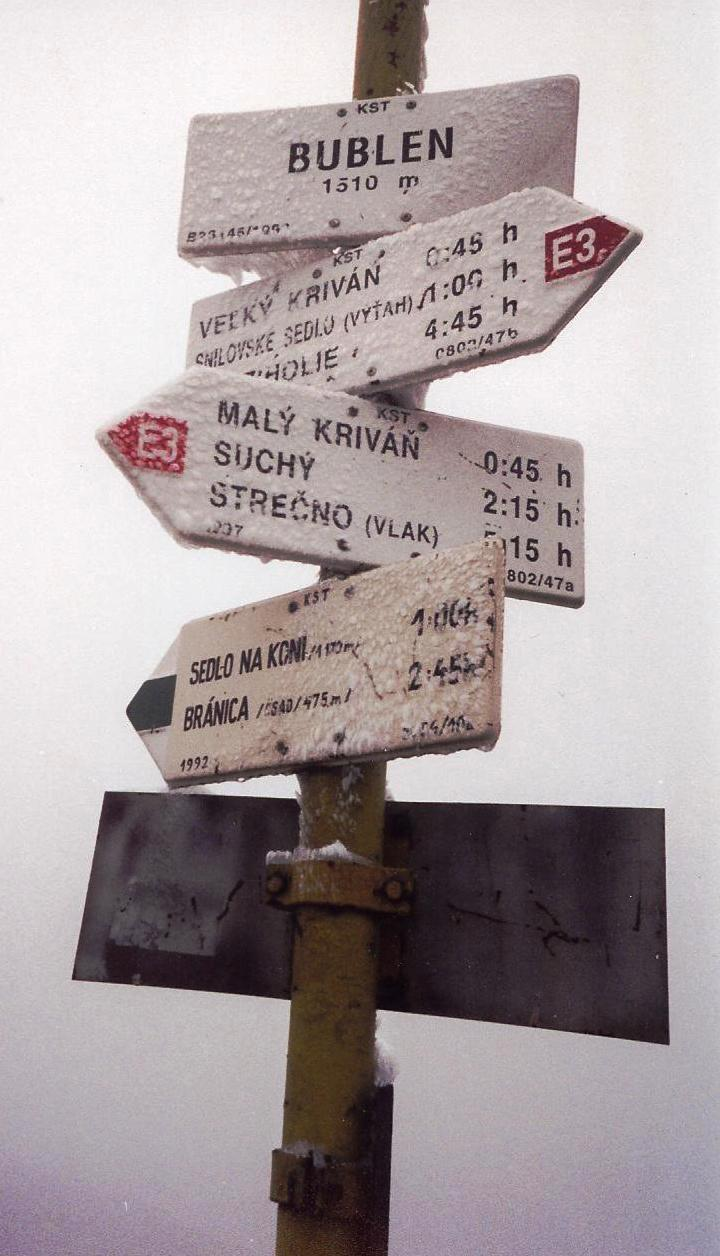
The E3 in spring 2005 on the lightly snowing Malá Fatra ("Lesser Fatra" mountains, the west end of the Carpathian mountains) in northern Slovakia. The E3 is well marked also on the maps of Slovakia and the Czech Republic.

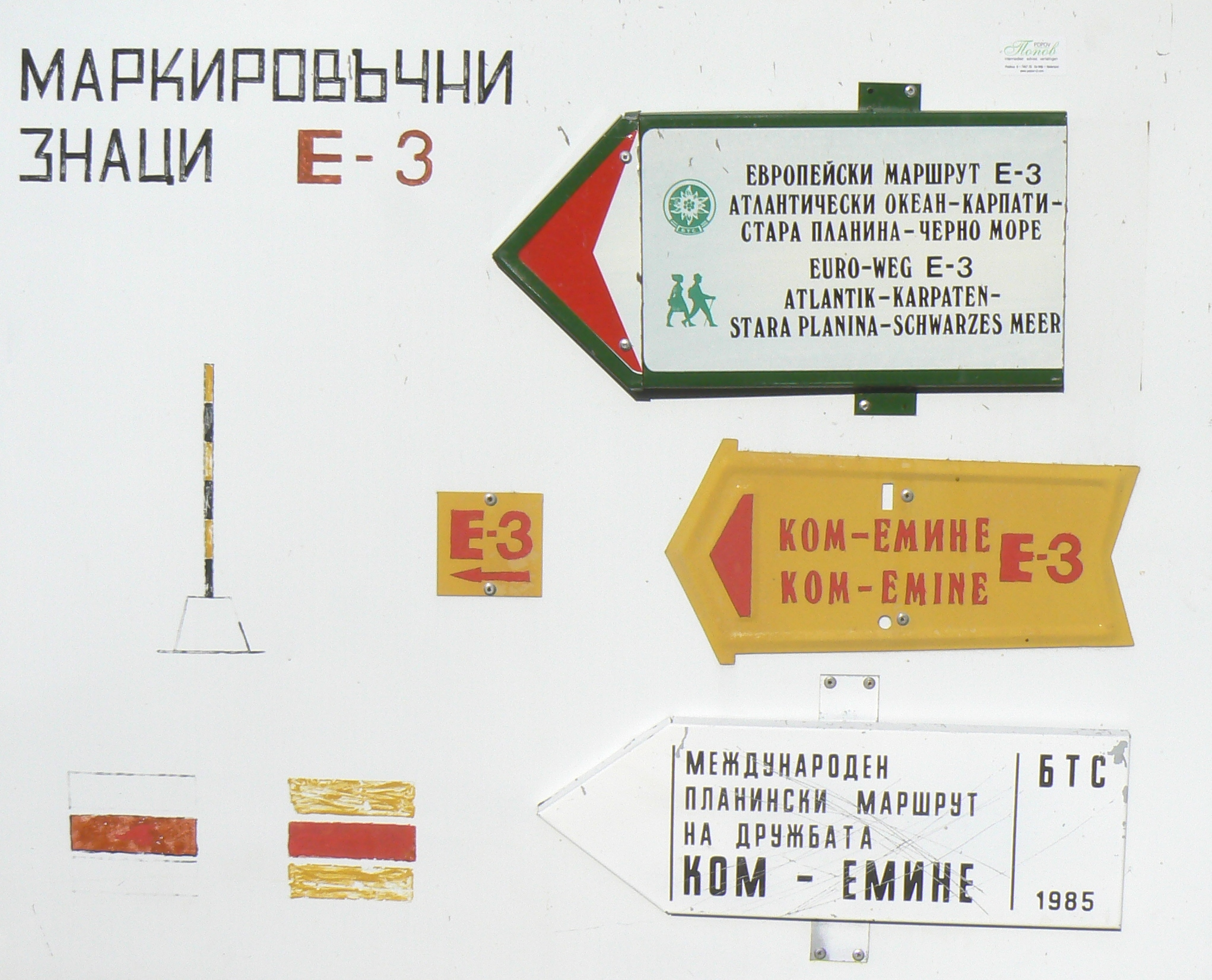
Markers used on the Bulgarian part of the route.

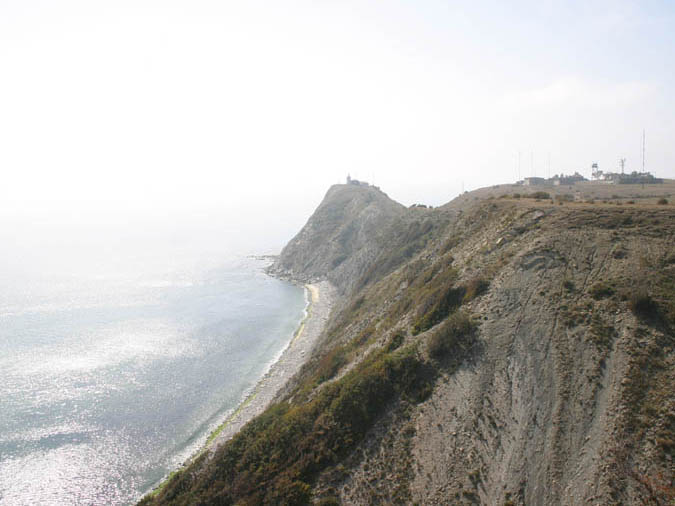
The E3 ends at Cape Emine.
