= German Peninsula =

Peninsula in Antarctica

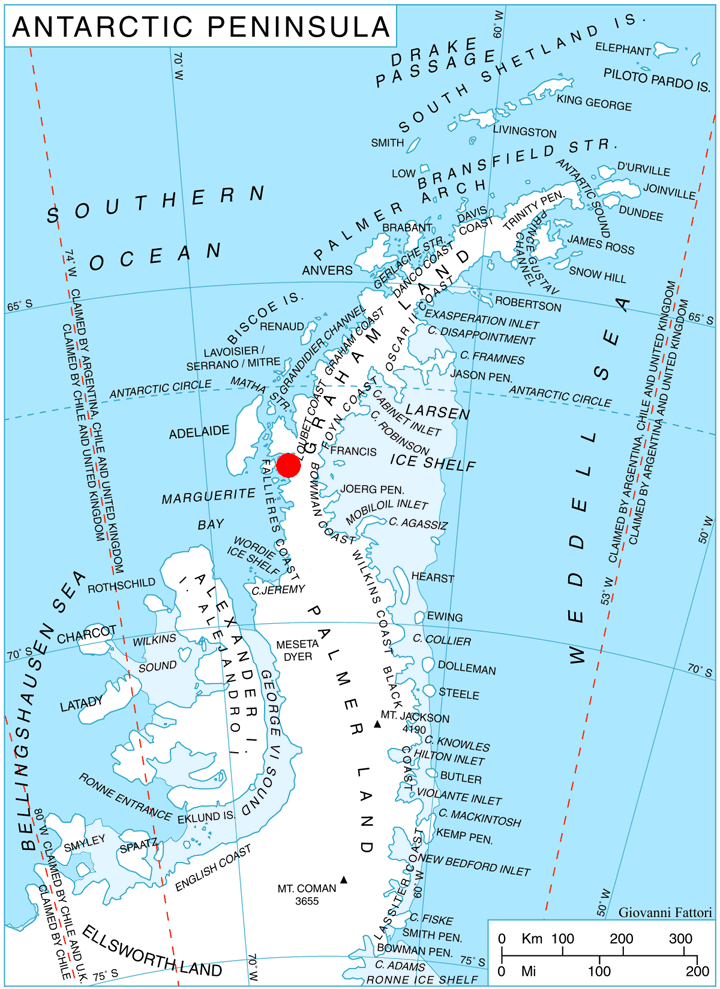
Location of German Peninsula in Graham Land, Antarctic Peninsula.

German Peninsula () is the mountainous peninsula projecting from the north end of Fallières Coast in Graham Land, Antarctica 11.4 km in west direction between Bourgeois Fjord to the north and west, and Dogs Leg Fjord to the south. It is extending 15.9 km between Thomson Head to the north and Bottrill Head to the southwest, with its interior occupied by Rudozem Heights.

The peninsula is named after the settlement of German in Western Bulgaria, now part of the city of Sofia.

== Location ==
German Peninsula is centred at 67°39′00″S 66°45′00″W. British mapping in 1978.

== Maps ==
- British Antarctic Territory. Scale 1:200000 topographic map. DOS 610 Series, Sheet W 67 66. Directorate of Overseas Surveys, Tolworth, UK, 1978.
- Antarctic Digital Database (ADD). Scale 1:250000 topographic map of Antarctica. Scientific Committee on Antarctic Research (SCAR), 1993–2016.
