= Square Bay =

Bay in Antarctica

Coordinates: 67°51′S 67°0′W

Square Bay is a bay, roughly square in outline and 10 nautical miles (18 km) wide, indenting the west coast of Graham Land between Nicholl Head and Camp Point. Most of the entrance to the bay is occupied by Horseshoe Island, which limits access to a narrow southern strait opening onto Marguerite Bay and a narrower northwestern strait opening onto the mouth of Bourgeois Fjord. Mapped and named by the British Graham Land Expedition (BGLE), 1934–37, under Rymill.

Broken Island and Centre Island lie in the north part of the bay.
