= Demorest Glacier =

Glacier in Antarctica

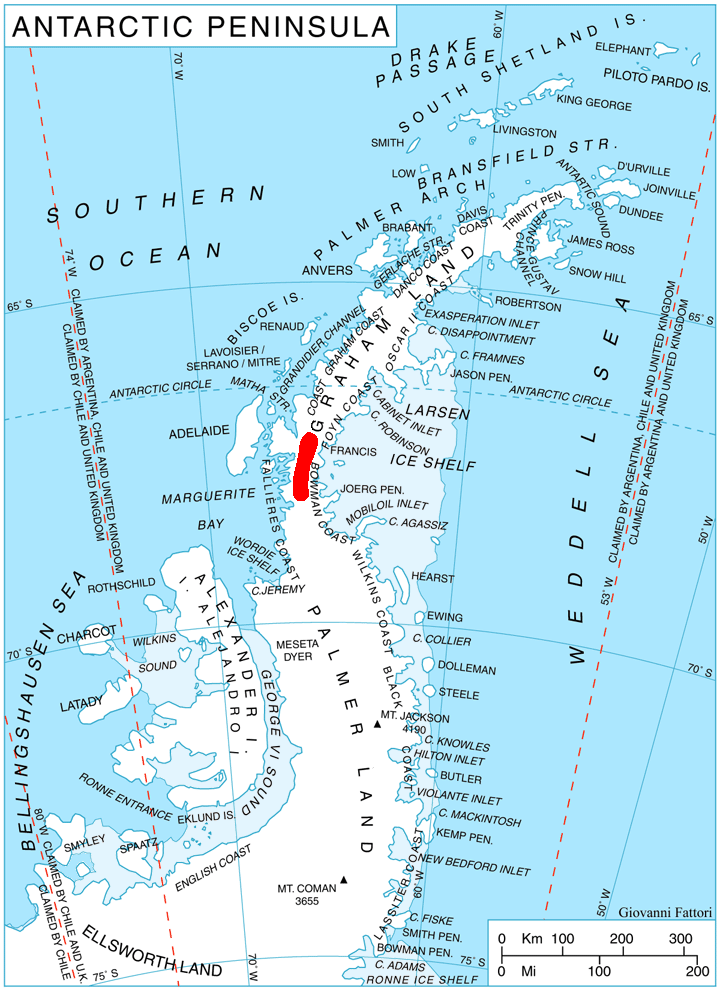
Location of Hemimont Plateau on the Antarctic Peninsula.

Demorest Glacier (67°22′S 65°35′W) is a glacier on the northeast side of Hemimont Plateau which flows southeast into Whirlwind Inlet between Flint Glacier and Matthes Glacier, on the east coast of Graham Land. It was discovered by Sir Hubert Wilkins on a flight of December 20, 1928, and photographed from the air by the United States Antarctic Service in 1940. It was charted by the Falkland Islands Dependencies Survey in 1947 and named for Max H. Demorest, an American glaciologist.

== See also ==
- Werenskiold Bastion
