= Dogs Leg Fjord =

Body of water in Graham Land, Antarctica

Coordinates: 67°43′S 66°52′W

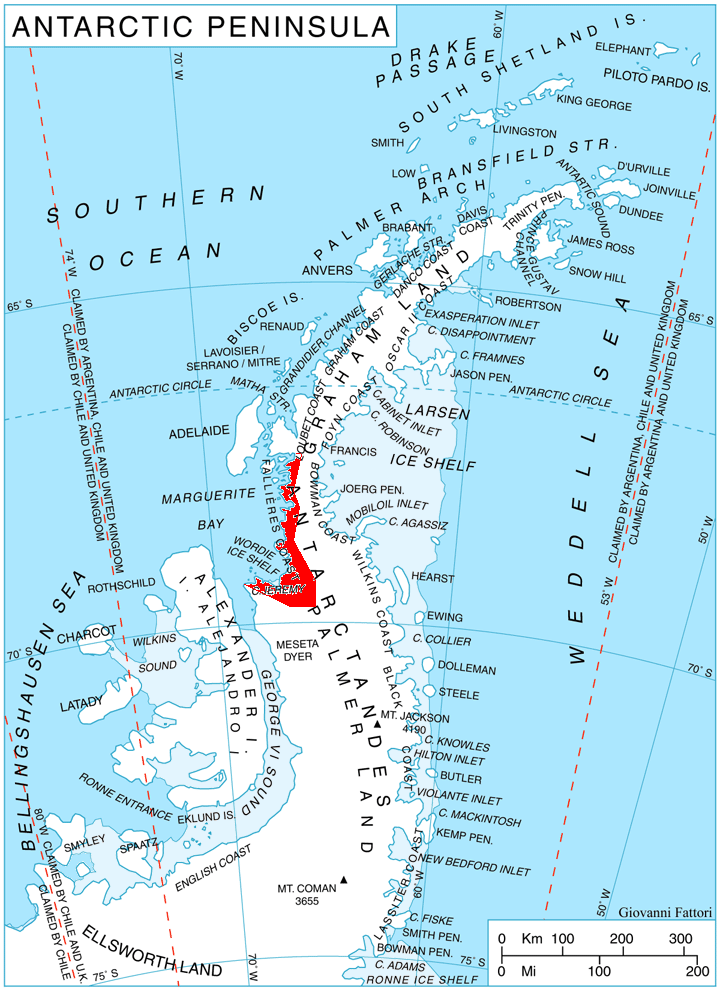
Location of Fallières Coast.

Dogs Leg Fjord is an inlet 6 nautical miles (11 km) long in an east–west direction and 1.5 nautical miles (3 km) wide, lying south of German Peninsula, directly east of Ridge Island and opening on Bourgeois Fjord, along the Fallières Coast on the west side of Graham Land, Antarctica. It was discovered by the British Graham Land Expedition, 1934–37, under John Rymill, and so named because of its shape.

== Map ==
- British Antarctic Territory. Scale 1:200000 topographic map. DOS 610 Series, Sheet W 67 66. Directorate of Overseas Surveys, Tolworth, UK, 1978.
