= Rudozem Heights =

Mountain in Antarctica

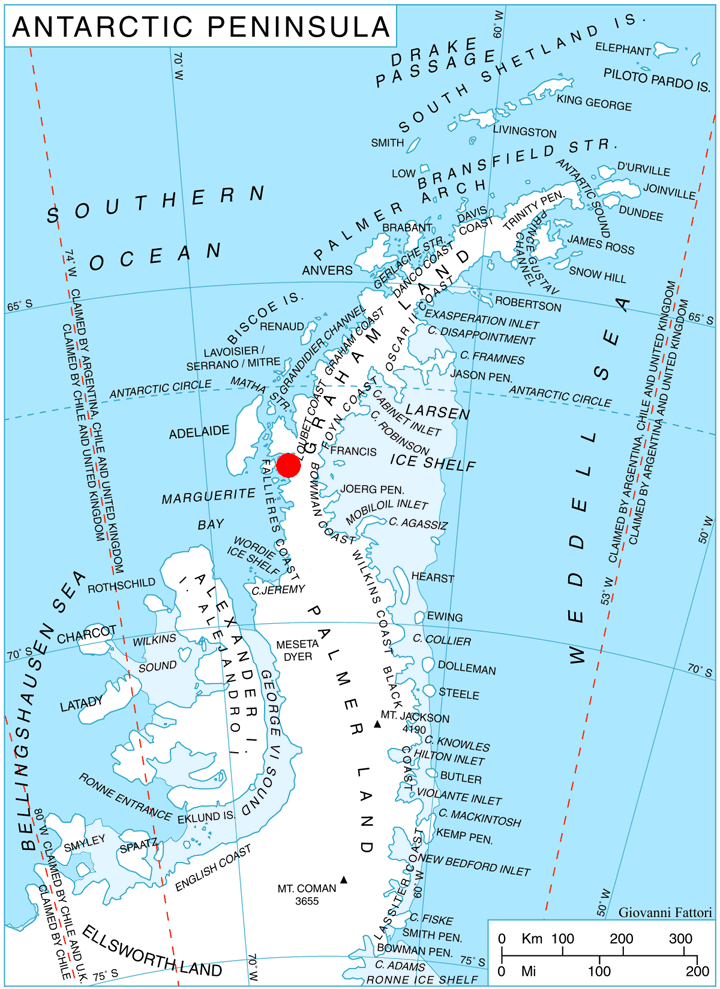
Location of German Peninsula in Graham Land, Antarctic Peninsula.

Rudozem Heights (Bulgarian: Рудоземски възвишения, ‘Rudozemski Vazvisheniya’ \ru-do-'zem-ski v&z-vi-'she-ni-ya\) are the heights rising to 1504 m (Glavinitsa Peak) at the base and in the interior of German Peninsula on Fallières Coast in Graham Land, Antarctica, extending 18.5 km in northeast-southwest direction and 13.7 km in east-west direction. The heights are bounded by Bourgeois Fjord to the north and west, Dogs Leg Fjord to the south, and to the east by a glacier draining both northwards into Bourgeois Fjord and southwards into Dogs Leg Fjord.

The heights are named after the town of Rudozem in Southern Bulgaria.

== Location ==
Rudozem Heights are centred at 67°39′00″S 66°42′00″W. British mapping in 1978.

== Maps ==
- British Antarctic Territory. Scale 1:200000 topographic map. DOS 610 Series, Sheet W 67 66. Directorate of Overseas Surveys, Tolworth, UK, 1978.
- Antarctic Digital Database (ADD). Scale 1:250000 topographic map of Antarctica. Scientific Committee on Antarctic Research (SCAR), 1993–2016.
