= Specimen Nunatak =

Nunatak in Graham Land, Antarctica

Specimen Nunatak (67°59′S 66°46′W) is a small but distinctive rock pinnacle that rises above the ice of Swithinbank Glacier about 4 nautical miles (7 km) south of the glacier terminus, in Graham Land. The feature was visited on February 9, 1941 by Herbert G. Dorsey and Joseph D. Healy of the United States Antarctic Service (USAS), 1939–41, who gave the name because the pinnacle was a good example of a nunatak projecting above a broad ice field.
