= Forbes Glacier (Graham Land) =

Glacier in Antarctica

Coordinates: 67°48′S 66°44′W

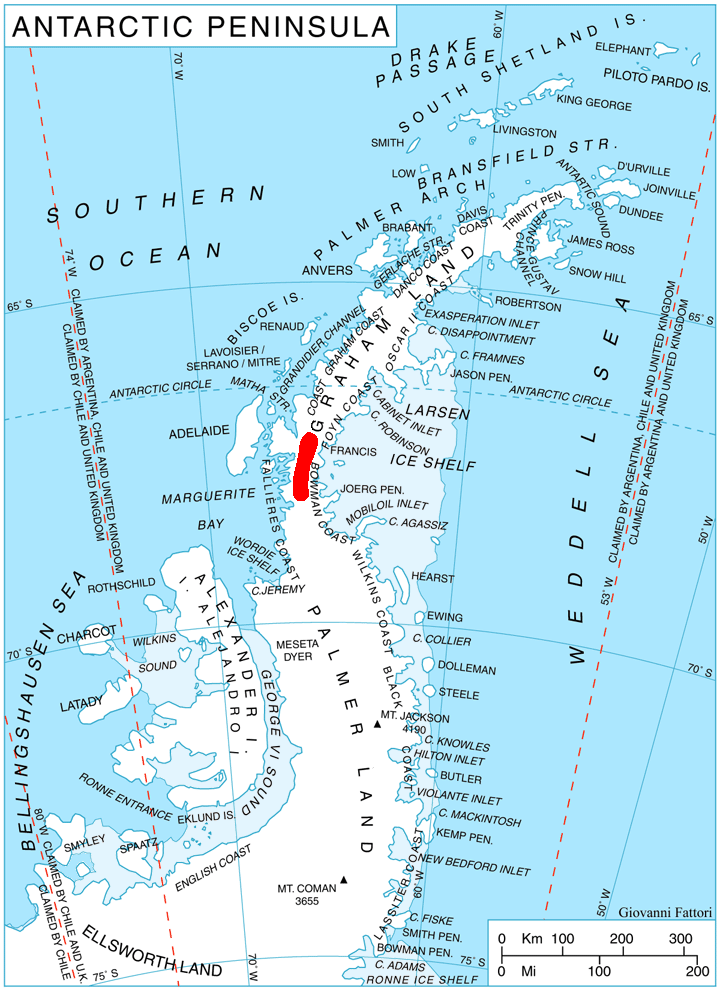
Location of Hemimont Plateau on the Antarctic Peninsula.

Forbes Glacier is a glacier which flows from Hemimont Plateau west into the northeast corner of Square Bay, on the west coast of Graham Land, Antarctica. It is 10 nautical miles (19 km) long, 4 nautical miles (7 km) wide in its central part, and narrows to 2 nautical miles (4 km) at its mouth. The lower reaches of the glacier were first surveyed in 1936 by the British Graham Land Expedition under John Rymill. The survey was completed in 1946–48 by the Falkland Islands Dependencies Survey who named the glacier for James David Forbes, a Scottish physicist who was noted for his pioneer works on glaciology.
