= Hemimont Plateau =

Plateau in Graham Land, Antarctica

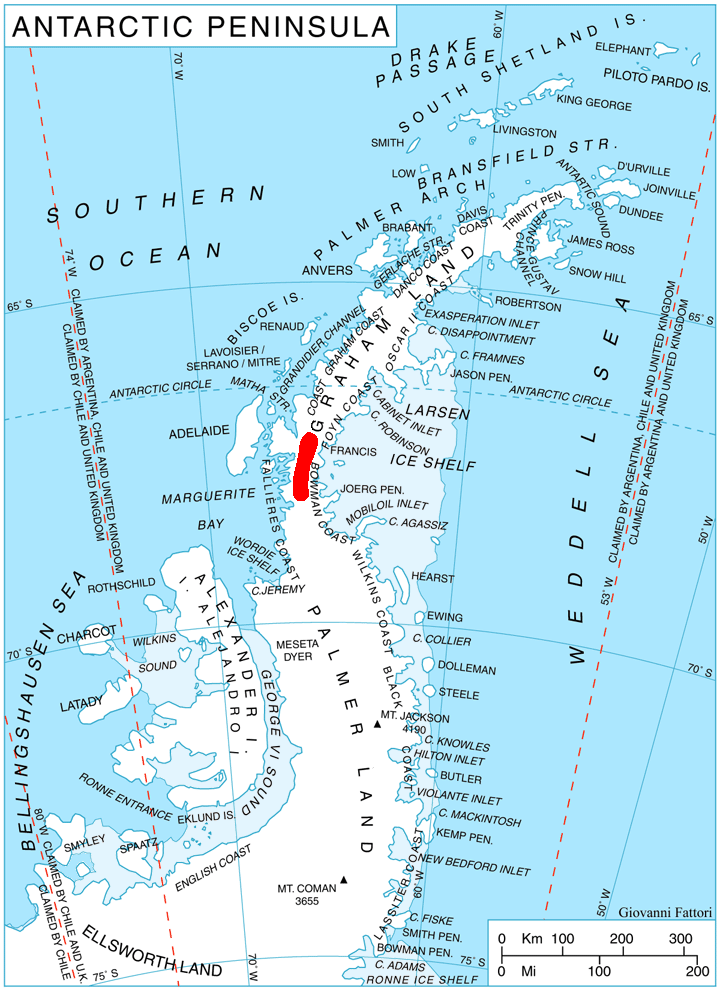
Location of Hemimont Plateau on the Antarctic Peninsula.

Hemimont Plateau (Bulgarian: плато Хемимонт, romanized: plato Hemimont, IPA: [plɐˈtɔ ˈxɛmimont]) is the long and narrow ice-covered plateau of elevation about 1600 m in southern Graham Land, Antarctica bordering Avery Plateau on the north. It is situated midway between Loubet Coast and Fallières Coast on the west, and Bowman Coast on the east, and extends 100 km from the heads of Finsterwalder Glacier and Demorest Glacier on the north to Neny Glacier on the south. Its higher southern part rises to 1862 m and features McLeod Hill (1741 m), Beacon Hill (1770 m) and Armadillo Hill (1775 m).

The plateau is named after the Roman province of Hemimont in Southeastern Bulgaria.

== Location ==
Hemimont Plateau is centred at 67°43′00″S 66°06′00″W. British mapping in 1974.

== Maps ==
- Antarctic Digital Database (ADD). Scale 1:250000 topographic map of Antarctica. Scientific Committee on Antarctic Research (SCAR). Since 1993, regularly upgraded and updated.
- British Antarctic Territory: Graham Land. Scale 1:250000 topographic map. BAS 250 Series, Sheet SQ 19–20. London, 1974.
