= Bourgeois Fjord =

Fjord in Antarctica

Coordinates: 67°40′S 67°5′W

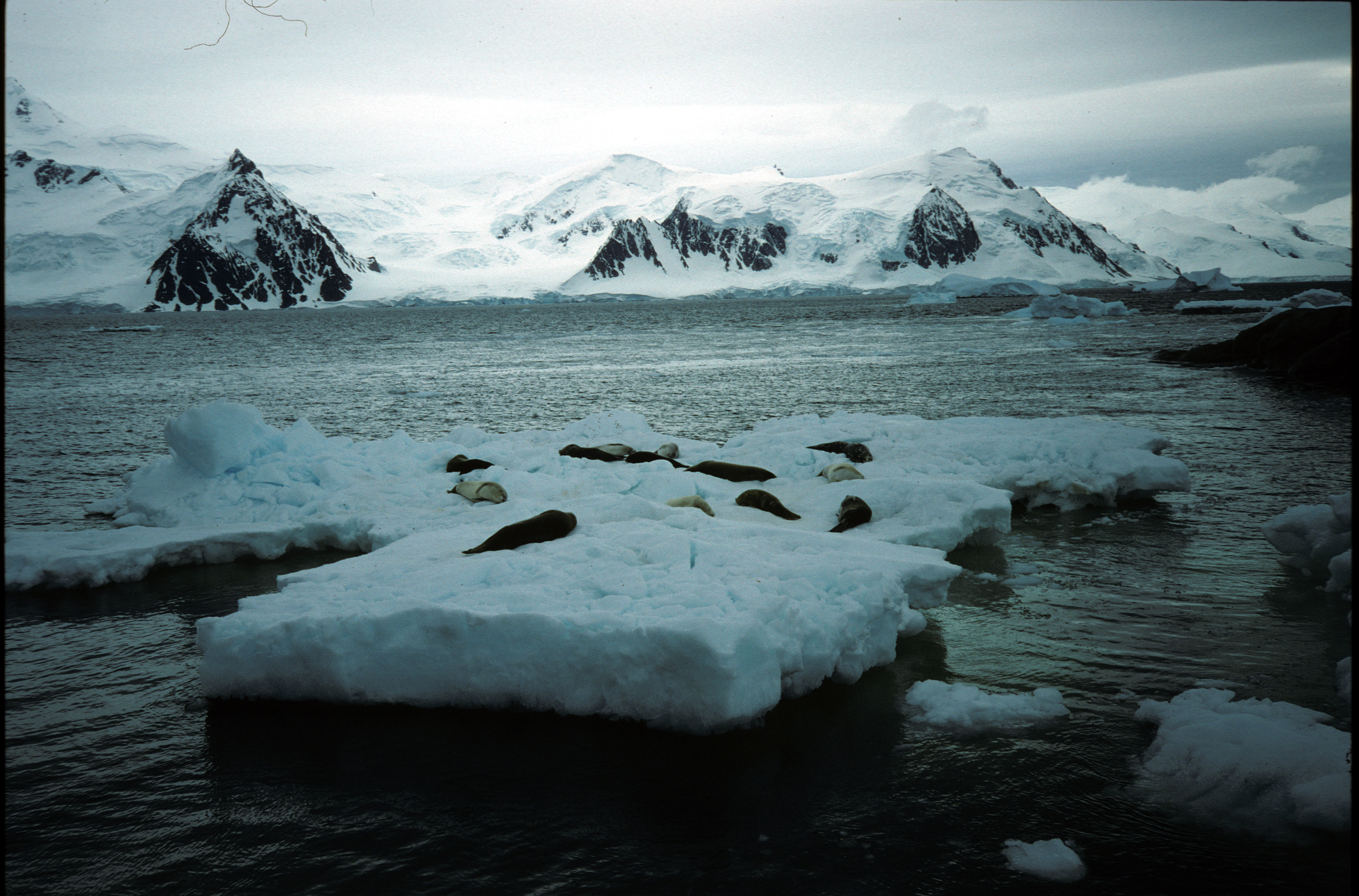
Bourgeois Fjord seals on ice floe.

Bourgeois Fjord is an inlet, 30 miles (50 km) long in a northeast–southwest direction and 3 to 5 miles (5 to 8 km) wide, lying between the east sides of Pourquoi Pas Island and Blaiklock Island and the west coast of Graham Land. It separates Loubet Coast to the north from Fallières Coast to the south. The fjord was discovered by the French Antarctic Expedition, 1908–10, under Jean-Baptiste Charcot, and named by him for Colonel Joseph E. Bourgeois, Director of the Geographic Service of the French Army. The outline of this inlet was more accurately delineated in 1936 by the British Graham Land Expedition under John Rymill.

== Map ==
- British Antarctic Territory. Scale 1:200000 topographic map. DOS 610 Series, Sheet W 67 66. Directorate of Overseas Surveys, Tolworth, UK, 1978.

== See also ==
- Lliboutry Glacier
