= Fallières Coast =

Coastline on the Antarctic Peninsula

Coordinates: 68°30′S 67°0′W

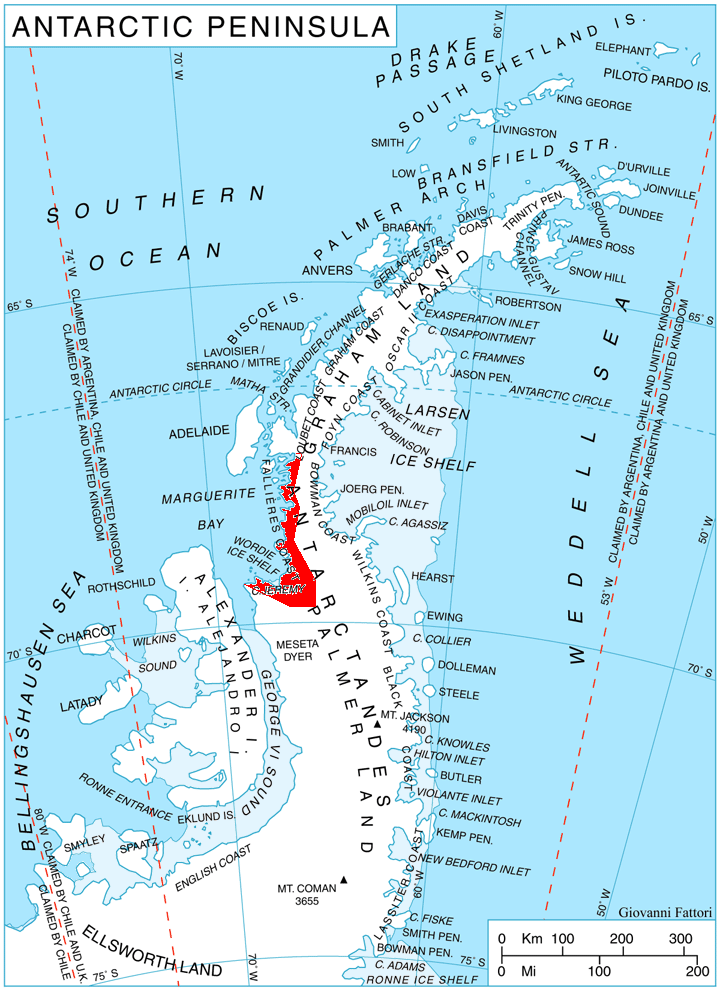
Location of Fallières Coast.

The Fallières Coast is that portion of the west coast of the Antarctic Peninsula between the head of Bourgeois Fjord and Cape Jeremy and lies on Marguerite Bay and the Wordie Ice Shelf. On the south it is joined by Rymill Coast, and in the north by Loubet Coast. Fallières Coast was first explored in January 1909 by the French Antarctic Expedition under J.B. Charcot, who named it for Armand Fallières, then President of France.
