= Neny =

Neny may refer to:

== People ==
- Mohamed El Neny

== Places ==
- Neny Bay
- Neny Fjord
- Neny Glacier
- Neny Island
