= Rhamnus =

Rhamnus may refer to:

- Rhamnus (city), or Rhamnous, an ancient Greek city in Attica
- Rhamnus (Crete), or Rhamnous, an ancient Greek town in Crete
- Rhamnus (plant) or buckthorns, a plant genus
- 9316 Rhamnus, a main-belt asteroid discovered in 1988
- Mount Rhamnus, a mountain in Antarctica
