= Northeast Glacier =

Antarctic glacier

- Location within Antarctica
- Location: Fallières Coast, Graham Land, Antarctica
- Coordinates: 68°09′S 66°58′W

Northeast Glacier (68°09′S 66°58′W) is a steep, heavily crevassed glacier, 13 nautical miles (24 km; 15 mi) long and 5 nautical miles (9.3 km; 5.8 mi) wide at its mouth, which flows from McLeod Hill westward and then south-westwards into Marguerite Bay between the Debenham Islands and Roman Four Promontory, on the west coast of Graham Land, Antarctica.

== Location ==
Fallières Coast on Antarctic Peninsula.

Northeast Glacier is on the west side of Hemimont Plateau. McLeod Hill, Beacon Hill and Armadillo Hill to its east are in the higher southern part of this plateau. The glacier flows west into Marguerite Bay in Graham Land on the Fallières Coast of the Antarctic Peninsula. It is southeast of Cape Calmette, west of Trail Inlet and north of Neny Fjord.

Features around the glacier include, from east to west, Armadillo Hill, Beacon Hill, McLeod Hill, Blow-me-down Bluff, The Amphitheatre, Walton Peak and Butson Ridge.

Islands off the mouth of the glacier include Stonington Island, Neny Island, Reference Islands, Millerand Island, Debenham Islands, Randall Rocks and Pod Rocks.

== Exploration and name ==
Northeast Glacier was first surveyed in 1936 by the British Graham Land Expedition (BGLE) under John Rymill.

It was resurveyed in 1940 by members of the United States Antarctic Service (USAS), who first used the glacier as a sledging route, and so named by them because it lay on the north-eastern side of their base at Stonington Island.

== Yapeyú Refuge ==
Yapeyú Refuge (68°05′00″S 66°41′00″W) is an Argentine Antarctic refuge nearby San Martín Base from which it depends. It is located on the Fallières Coast in the Antarctic Peninsula. The refuge was inaugurated on November 4, 1956, as logistical support and is administered by the Argentine Army. The shelter is located at 600 meters above the Northeast Glacier.

In 1956, during the installation of the San Martín Base, the Argentine Army built three refuges in order to have logistical support from Marguerite Bay, in the Bellingshausen Sea, to the Weddell Sea crossing the Antarctic Peninsula from west to east. The three refuges were built: the Chacabuco, the Yapeyú and the Maipú. The project took 63 days, travelling about 786 kilometres using sled pulled by dogs. The refuge has food, equipment, medicines and fuel and was used for scientific projects carried out in the 1957–1958 International Geophysical Year. The refuge pay homage to Yapeyú, the birthplace of José de San Martín.

== Features ==
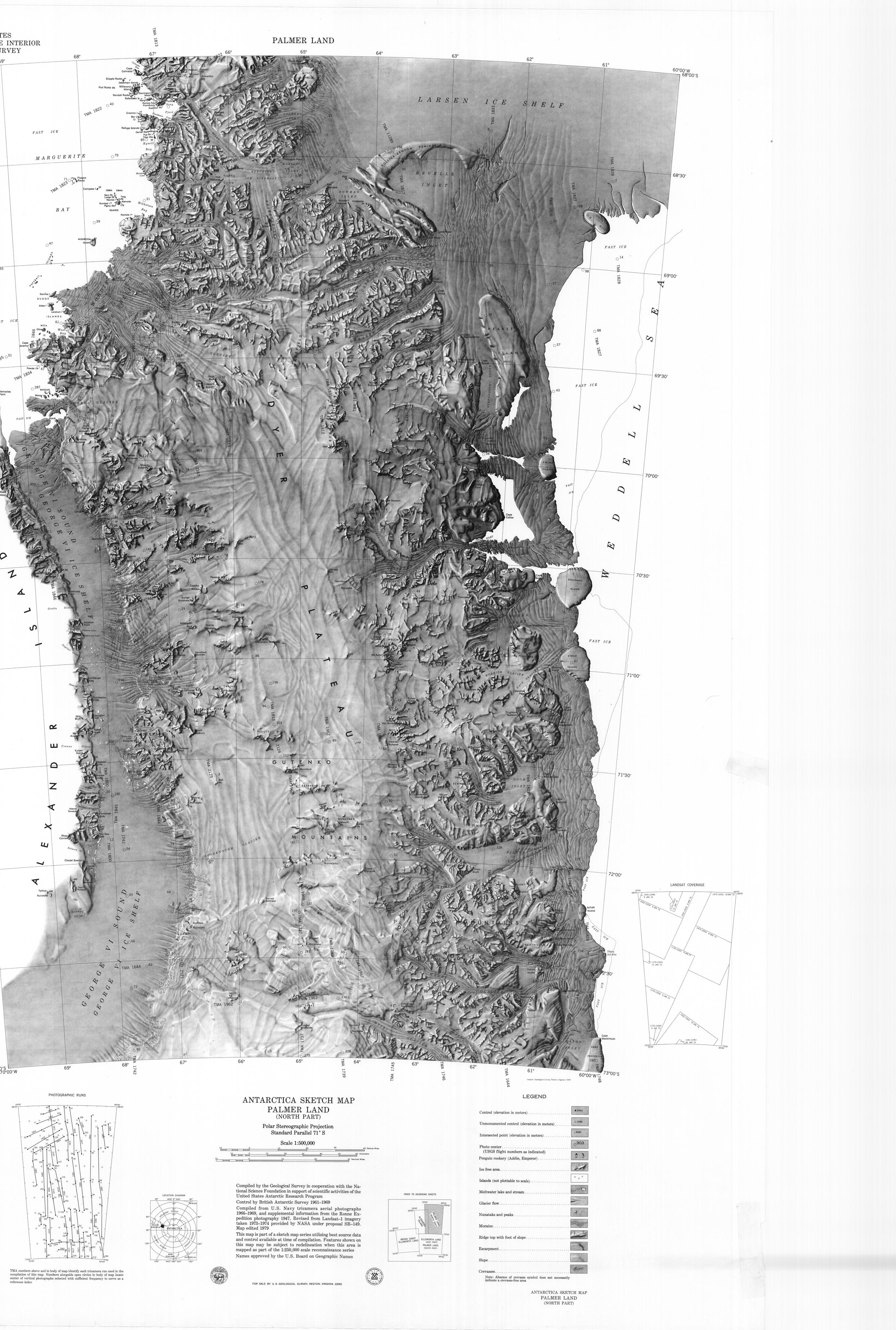
Northern Palmer Land. Northeast Glacier in extreme northwest of map

=== Armadillo Hill ===
68°07′S 66°22′W.

Ice-covered hill which rises to 1,760 metres (5,770 ft) high and projects 120 metres (390 ft) high above the surrounding ice sheet, situated on the Graham Land plateau 4 nautical miles (7.4 km; 4.6 mi) east-southeast of the head of Northeast Glacier and 8 nautical miles (15 km; 9.2 mi) northeast of the head of Neny Fjord. First roughly surveyed by the BGLE, 1934–37, and resurveyed in 1940 by sledging parties of the USAS on whose field charts the hill is labeled "Sawtooth." Named Armadillo Hill by the Falkland Islands Dependencies Survey (FIDS) following its 1946-47 survey, because when viewed from the northeast the tumbled ice blocks on the summit and general shape of the hill resemble the side view of an armadillo.

=== Beacon Hill ===
68°04′S 66°23′W.

An ice-covered, dome-shaped hill 1,810 metres (5,940 ft) high which rises 120 metres (390 ft) high above the surrounding plateau ice surface, situated 2.5 nautical miles (4.6 km; 2.9 mi) northeast of McLeod Hill. The hill surmounts the divide between Northeast Glacier and Bills Gulch. Surveyed and named by the USAS, 1939–41; the hill may have been the site of a beacon at that time. The USAS operated a plateau weather station close southwestward (68°07′S 66°30′W) of the hill throughout November and December 1940.

=== McLeod Hill ===
68°05′S 66°30′W.

Rounded, ice-covered hill, 1,790 metres (5,870 ft) high, which forms a prominent landmark 1 nautical mile (1.9 km; 1.2 mi) east of the head of Northeast Glacier. First roughly surveyed in 1936 by the BGLE, and resurveyed by the USAS, 1939–41. It was resurveyed in 1946 by the FIDS and named for Kenneth A. McLeod, FIDS meteorological observer who, during July-December 1947, occupied with a member of the RARE the plateau meteorological station 1 nautical mile (1.9 km; 1.2 mi) east of this hill.

=== Blow-me-down Bluff ===
68°03′S 66°40′W.

Prominent rock bluff, 1,820 metres (5,970 ft) high, standing at the north flank of Northeast Glacier. Roughly surveyed in 1936 by the BGLE, and by the USAS in 1940. Resurveyed in 1946 and 1948 by the FIDS, who so named it because the bluff stands in the windiest part of Northeast Glacier and many members of FIDS sledge parties have fallen in this area in high winds.

=== The Amphitheatre ===
68°06′S 66°34′W.

A large bowl-shaped depression,0.75 nautical miles (1.39 km; 0.86 mi) in diameter, at the south side of the head of Northeast Glacier. The feature lies adjacent to former bases of the BGLE, 1934–37, and the USAS, 1939–41, and was charted by USAS sledging parties which crossed Graham Land via Northeast Glacier and Bills Gulch. Named by the FIDS following its survey in 1946.

=== Walton Peak ===
68°09′S 66°48′W.

A sharp peak, 825 metres (2,707 ft) high, which stands 2 nautical miles (3.7 km; 2.3 mi) north of Mount Rhamnus and is part of the irregular ridge separating Northeast Glacier from Neny Fjord, on the west coast of Graham Land. First surveyed in 1936 by the BGLE under Rymill. Resurveyed in 1946 and 1948 by the FIDS. Named for Eric W.K. Walton, FIDS engineer at Stonington Island in 1946 and 1947, who in 1946 rescued J.E. Tonkin of FIDS from a crevasse in Northeast Glacier.

=== Butson Ridge ===
68°05′S 66°53′W.

A rocky ridge with a number of ice-covered summits, the highest 1,305 metres (4,281 ft) high, forming the north wall of Northeast Glacier. First surveyed in 1936 by the BGLE under John Rymill. Resurveyed in 1946-48 by the FIDS and named for Doctor Arthur R.C. Butson, FIDS medical officer at Stonington Island, who in July 1947 rescued a member of the Ronne Antarctic Research Expedition (RARE) from a crevasse in Northeast Glacier.

=== Back Bay ===
68°11′S 67°00′W.

A bay 0.5 nautical miles (0.93 km; 0.58 mi) wide along the west coast of Graham Land, entered between Stonington Island and Fitzroy Island (Antarctica). The head of the bay is formed by Northeast Glacier. The bay was first surveyed by the USAS, 1939–41, and so named by them because of its location at the rear (northeast) side of Stonington Island.

== Offshore islands ==
=== Reference Islands ===
68°12′S 67°10′W.

Rocky islands 2 nautical miles (3.7 km; 2.3 mi) west-northwest of the west tip of Neny Island and 1.5 nautical miles (2.8 km; 1.7 mi) southeast of Millerand Island, lying in Marguerite Bay off the west coast of Graham Land. First roughly charted in 1936 by the BGLE under John Rymill. The islands were surveyed by the FIDS in 1947, and so named by them because they served as a convenient reference point for survey work.

=== Millerand Island ===
68°09′S 67°13′W.

A high rugged island 3 nautical miles (5.6 km; 3.5 mi) in diameter, lying 4 nautical miles (7.4 km; 4.6 mi) south of Cape Calmette. Discovered by the French Antarctic Expedition (FrAE) under Jean-Baptiste Charcot, 1908-10. Named by Charcot, presumably for Alexandre Millerand, French statesman.

=== Joubert Rock ===
68°12′S 67°41′W.

A rock with a least depth of 41 feet (12 m), lying 5 nautical miles (9.3 km; 5.8 mi) southwest of Pod Rocks and 9 nautical miles (17 km; 10 mi) west-southwest of Millerand Island. Charted by the Hydrographic Survey Unit from RRS John Biscoe in 1966. Named for Arthur B.D. Joubert, third officer of John Biscoe and officer of the watch when the rock was discovered.

=== Sanavirón Island ===
68°09′S 67°05′W.

An island lying off Northeast Glacier, southeast of Audrey Island, Debenham Islands. Charted by the Argentine Antarctic Expedition, 1950–51, as two small islands (probably because of overlying ice) and named "Islotes Sanavirón" after the Argentine ship Sanavirón, used for the hydrographic survey of the area. The feature has been determined to be a single island.

=== Randall Rocks ===
68°11′S 67°17′W.

Group of rocks situated 0.5 nautical miles (0.93 km; 0.58 mi) off the southwest corner of Miller and Island and trending in a northwest–southeast direction for 1 nautical mile (1.9 km; 1.2 mi), lying in Marguerite Bay off the west coast of Graham Land. First roughly surveyed in 1936 by the BGLE under John Rymill. Resurveyed in

=== Pod Rocks ===
68°09′S 67°30′W.

Small compact group of rocks, lying 5 nautical miles (9.3 km; 5.8 mi) west of Millerand Island. First roughly surveyed in 1936 by the BGLE under John Rymill. The rocks were visited and resurveyed in 1949 by the FIDS, who established a sealing camp there. The name, proposed by FIDS, derives from the old sealers' term "pod," meaning a group of seals hauled ashore.

== Sources ==
- Alberts, Fred G., ed. (1995), Geographic Names of the Antarctic (PDF) (2 ed.), United States Board on Geographic Names This article incorporates public domain material from websites or documents of the United States Board on Geographic Names.
- "Hemimont Plateau", SCAR Composite Gazetteer of Antarctica, Scientific Committee on Antarctic Research
- Palmer Land, USGS: United States Geological Survey

This article incorporates public domain material from websites or documents of the United States Geological Survey.
