= Williamson Bluff =

Bluff in Graham Land, Antarctica

- Bluff
- Location within Antarctica
- Coordinates: 68°5′S 65°42′W
- Location: Bowman Coast, Graham Land, Antarctica
- Etymology: Rev. William Williamson, mathematician and lawyer who made one of the earliest measurements of the surface flow of a glacier
- Elevation: 1,000 m (3,300 ft)

Williamson Bluff is a flat-topped bluff more than 1,000 metres (3,300 ft) high near the head of Trail Inlet on the east coast of Graham Land. The upper part of the bluff is snow topped, but the sides are steep and rocky. The bluff extends from the east side of Bills Gulch, 4 nautical miles (7.4 km; 4.6 mi) northeast of Mount Shelby. First photographed from aircraft by personnel of United States Antarctic Service (USAS) on a flight of September 28, 1940. Named by United Kingdom Antarctic Place-Names Committee (UK-APC) after the Rev. William Williamson (1804–75), British mathematician and lawyer who made one of the earliest measurements of the surface flow of a glacier, in Switzerland, 1844.
