= Rowe Bluff =

Bluff in Graham Land, Antarctica

Rowe Bluff (68°1′S 65°33′W) is a bluff rising to 1,200 m on the north side of Trail Inlet, Bowman Coast, 5 nautical miles (9 km) northeast of Williamson Bluff. The bluff was photographed from the air by Lincoln Ellsworth, November 21, 1935, and was mapped from these photographs by W.L.G. Joerg. It appears in subsequent American photographs from United States Antarctic Service (USAS), 1940, and was surveyed by Falkland Islands Dependencies Survey (FIDS), 1946–48. Named by Advisory Committee on Antarctic Names (US-ACAN) in 1977 for Lieutenant Commander Gary L. Rowe, USCG, Engineer Officer on USCGC Burton Island, U.S. Navy Operation Deep Freeze, 1975.
