= Cape Church =

Bluff in Graham Land, Antarctica

Cape Church (67°51′S 65°35′W) is a rocky bluff which projects into the head of Seligman Inlet immediately north of Ahlmann Glacier, on the east coast of Graham Land. It was photographed from the air in 1940 by the United States Antarctic Service. It was charted in 1947 by the Falkland Islands Dependencies Survey, who named it for Professor James E. Church of the Agricultural Experiment Station, University of Nevada, who developed techniques of snow surveying and meltwater run-off forecasts now widely used.
