= Meridian Glacier =

Glacier in Antarctica

Meridian Glacier (68°45′S 66°37′W) is a broad glacier, 9 nautical miles (17 km) long, which flows south along the west side of Godfrey Upland and joins Clarke Glacier between Behaim Peak and Elton Hill, in southern Graham Land, Antarctica. Finn Ronne and Carl R. Eklund of the United States Antarctic Service travelled along this glacier in January 1941. It was photographed from the air by the Ronne Antarctic Research Expedition in November 1947, and surveyed by the Falkland Islands Dependencies Survey in December 1958. The glacier was so named by the UK Antarctic Place-Names Committee because it flows from north to south along the meridian.
