= Edisto Rocks =

- Location within Antarctica

Geography
- Location: Antarctica
- Coordinates: 68°13′S 67°8′W

Administration
- Administered under the Antarctic Treaty System

Demographics
- Population: Uninhabited

The Edisto Rocks are low rocks 2.2 kilometres (1.2 nmi) southwest of the western tip of Neny Island, lying in Marguerite Bay off the west coast of Graham Land. They were surveyed in 1947 by the Falkland Islands Dependencies Survey (FIDS) and named for the USS Edisto, an icebreaker with U.S. Navy Operation Windmill, which visited Marguerite Bay in February 1948 and assisted in the relief of the Ronne Antarctic Research Expedition and FIDS parties on Stonington Island.
