= Behaim Peak =

Mountain in Antarctica

Behaim Peak (68°47′S 66°43′W) is a conspicuous pyramid-shaped rock peak, 1,150 metres (3,770 ft) high, at the south extremity of the mountains separating Meridian Glacier and Doggo Defile, on the west side of the Antarctic Peninsula. It was photographed from the air by the Ronne Antarctic Research Expedition in November 1947, and surveyed from the ground by the Falkland Islands Dependencies Survey in December 1958. The peak was named by the UK Antarctic Place-Names Committee after Martin Behaim, a German cosmographer and navigator who is credited with the first adoption of the astronomer's astrolabe for navigation at sea, in 1480.
