= Beehive Hill =

Hill in Antarctica

Coordinates: 68°16′S 66°10′W

Beehive Hill is an ice-covered hill in Antarctica, which rises to 2,030 metres (6,660 ft) and projects 610 metres (2,000 ft) above the surrounding ice sheet. It is situated on the plateau of Graham Land 10 nautical miles (19 km) east of the head of Neny Fjord and close north of the head of Wyatt Glacier. It was first surveyed in 1940 by the United States Antarctic Service, on whose field charts the hill is labeled "Sphinx", and re-surveyed in 1946 by the Falkland Islands Dependencies Survey who gave the present name because of the hill's resemblance to a wicker beehive.
