= Hadley Upland =

Area of land in Antarctica

- Location within Antarctica

Highest point
- Elevation: 2,040 m (6,690 ft)
- Prominence: 1,021 m (3,350 ft)
- Listing: Ribu

Geography
- Continent: Antarctica
- Region: Graham Land
- Range coordinates: 68°29′S 66°24′W

Hadley Upland (68°29′S 66°24′W) is a triangular shaped remnant plateau with an undulating surface, 1,500 to 1,900 metres (4,900 to 6,200 ft), in southern Graham Land, Antarctica. It is bounded by Windy Valley and Martin Glacier, Gibbs Glacier and Lammers Glacier.

== Location ==
Fallières Coast on Antarctic Peninsula.

Hadley Upland is to the east of Marguerite Bay in Graham Land on the Fallières Coast of the Antarctic Peninsula. Godfrey Upland is to the south, Traffic Circle, Mercator Ice Piedmont and Mobiloil Inlet are to the east, Solberg Inlet and Joerg Peninsula are to the north east and Walton Peak is to the north. Gibbs Glacier flows along the northeast side of the upland. Windy Valley and Lammers Glacier define the south side. Bertrand Ice Piedmont, Rymill Bay and Neny Fjord are on the northwest side.

Snowshoe Glacier and Remus Glacier flow into Neny Fjord. Romulus Glacier and Martin Glacier flow into Rymill Bay. Other features and nearby features, from north to south, include the Blackwall Mountains, Neny Matterhorn, Black Thumb, Mount Lupa, Mount Medina, Mount Cortes and Mount Ptolemy.

== Exploration and name ==
The existence of this upland was known to the United States Antarctic Service (USAS), 1939–41, Finn Ronne and Carl R. Eklund having travelled along Lammer Glacier and Gibbs Glacier in January 1941. The upland was surveyed by the Falkland Islands Dependencies Survey (FIDS) in 1948–50 and 1958. It was named by the UK Antarctic Place-Names Committee (UK-ADC) after John Hadley, an English mathematician who, at the same time as Thomas Godfrey, independently invented the quadrant (the forerunner of the sextant), in 1730–31.

== Features ==
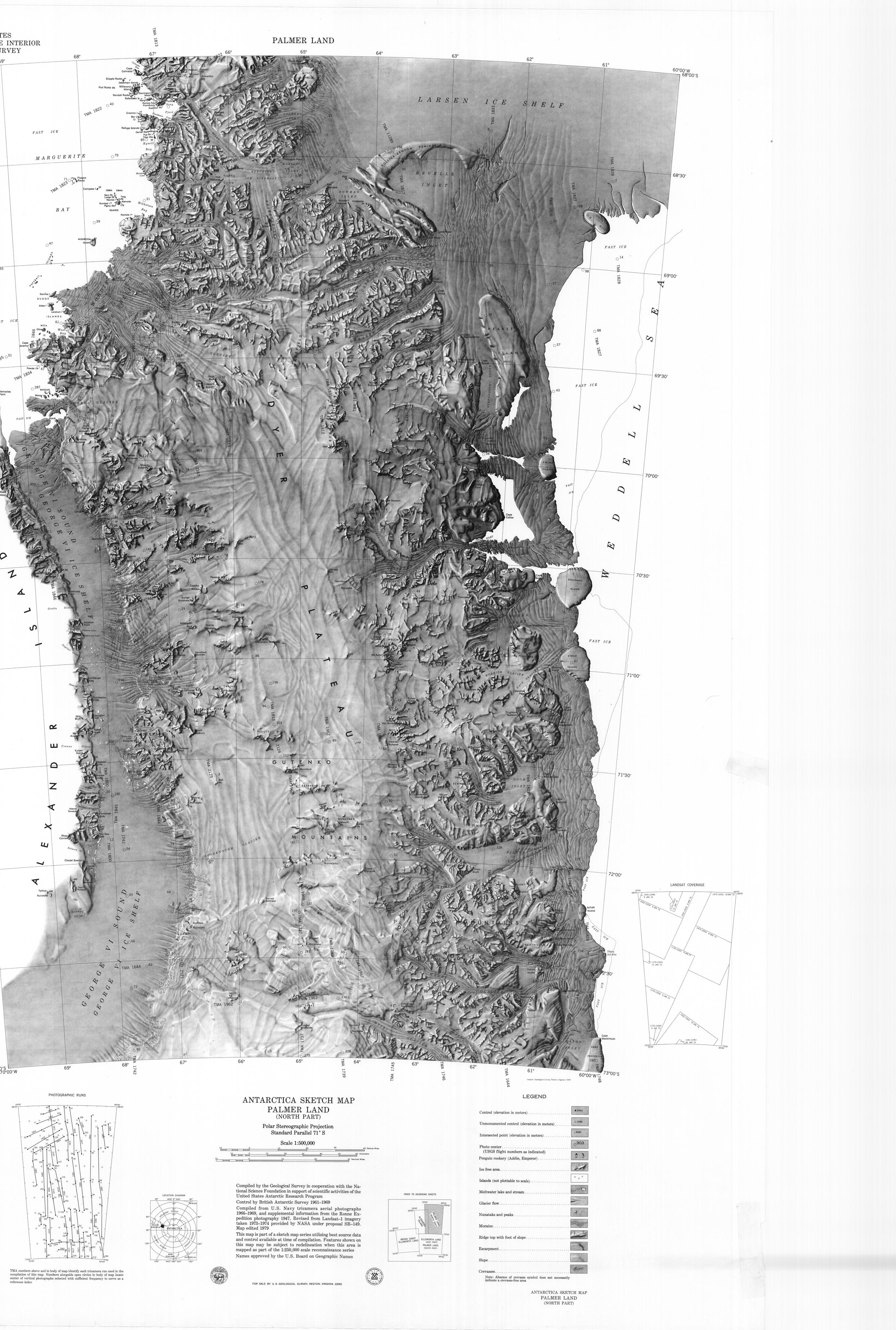
Northern Palmer Land. Hadley Upland in northwest of map

Features and nearby features include:

=== Red Rock Ridge ===
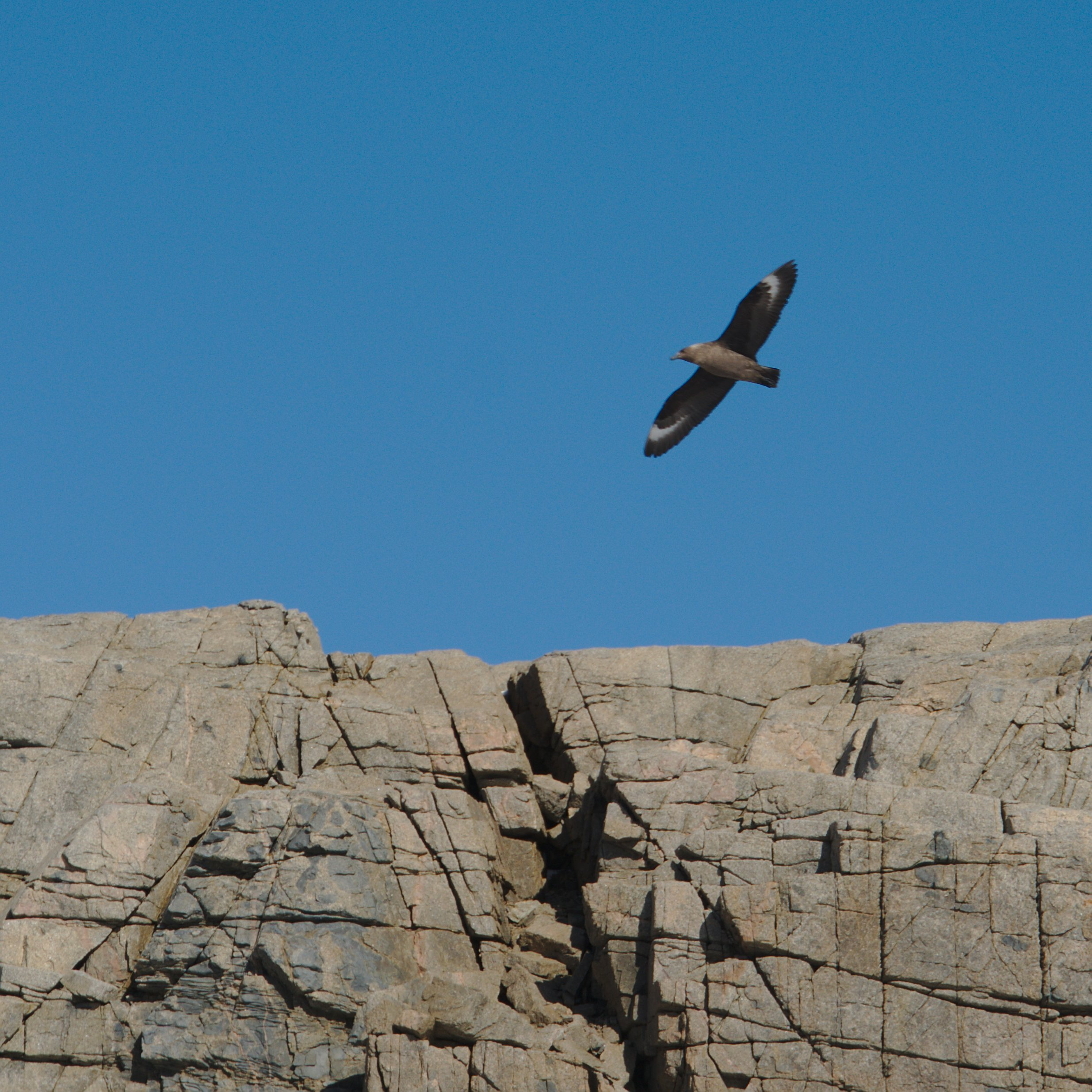
Red Rock Ridge

68°18′S 67°08′W. A conspicuous reddish-colored promontory which rises to 690 metres (2,260 ft) high and projects from the west coast of Graham Land between Neny Fjord and Rymill Bay. Surveyed in 1936 by the BGLE under John Rymill, who so named it because of its color. Further surveys in 1948 by the FIDS have identified this ridge as the feature first sighted in 1909 and named "Ile Pavie" or "Cap Pavie" by the FrAE under Charcot, but the name Red Rock Ridge is now too firmly established to alter. The name Pavie Ridge has been assigned to the prominent rocky ridge at 68°34'S, 66°59'W.

=== Safety Col ===
68°20′S 66°57′W. A snow-covered col, 185 metres (607 ft) high, between Red Rock Ridge and the Blackwall Mountains. First surveyed in 1936 by the BGLE under John Rymill. Resurveyed in 1948–49 by the FIDS, and so named by them because the col affords a safe sledging route between Neny Fjord and Rymill Bay when there is open water off the west end of Red Rock Ridge.

=== Blackwall Mountains ===
68°22′S 66°48′W. Mountains rising to 1,370 metres (4,490 ft) high, extending in a west-northwest – east-southeast direction for 5 nautical miles (9.3 km; 5.8 mi) and lying close south of Neny Fjord. They are bounded to the east by Remus Glacier, to the south by Romulus Glacier, and are separated from Red Rock Ridge to the west by Safety Col. First roughly surveyed in 1936 by the BGLE under Rymill. Resurveyed in 1948-49 by the FIDS, and so named by them because the black cliffs of the mountains facing Rymill Bay remain snow free throughout the year.

=== Little Thumb ===
68°19′S 66°53′W. A small isolated rock tower, 825 metres (2,707 ft) high, on the south side of Neny Fjord, standing close south of The Spire at the northwest end of the Blackwall Mountains. First surveyed in 1936 by the BGLE under John Rymill. It was climbed on January 22, 1948 by members of RARE and FIDS, who used variations of this name in referring to the feature.

=== Neny Matterhorn ===
68°20′S 66°51′W. A sharp, pyramid-shaped peak over 1,125 metres (3,691 ft) high, standing in the northwest part of the Blackwall Mountains on the south side of Neny Fjord. First roughly surveyed in 1936-37 by the BGLE under John Rymill, and resurveyed in 1948-49 by the FIDS. The name was apparently first used by members of the RARE, 1947-48, under Finn Ronne, and the FIDS, and derives from its location near Neny Fjord, and its resemblance to the Swiss Matterhorn.

=== Black Thumb ===
68°25′S 66°53′W. A mountain, 1,190 metres (3,900 ft) high, with notched and precipitous sides, standing between Romulus Glacier and Bertrand Ice Piedmont. Charted and named by the BGLE under Rymill, 1934-37.

=== Mount Lupa ===
68°26′S 66°43′W. A flat- topped, ice-covered mountain over 1,625 metres (5,331 ft) high, standing between Romulus Glacier and Martin Glacier close east-southeast of Black Thumb and 5 nautical miles (9.3 km; 5.8 mi) east of the head of Rymill Bay. First roughly surveyed in 1936 by the BGE under Rymill. Resurveyed in 1948-49 by the FIDS who applied the name. This mountain lies near the heads of Romulus and Remus Glaciers, and the name derives from the mythological story of the she-wolf which fed these twins after they had been thrown into the Tiber.

=== Mount Medina ===
68°27′S 66°15′W. A prominent ice-covered mountain 1,845 metres (6,053 ft) high which rises from the northeast part of Hadley Upland and overlooks the head of Gibbs Glacier. Photographed by RARE in November 1947 (trimetrogon air photography). Surveyed by FIDS, 1958. Named by UK-APC after Pedro de Medina (1493-1567), Spanish Cosmographer Royal, who wrote Arte de Navegar (Valladolid, 1545), an important manual of navigation.

=== Mount Cortés ===
68°29′S 66°06′W. A mainly ice-covered mountain 1,490 metres (4,890 ft) high on the southwest side of Gibbs Glacier in southern Graham Land. It is separated from Hadley Upland by a col 1,300 metres (4,300 ft) high. Photographed by RARE, November 1947 (trimetrogon air photography). Surveyed from the ground by FIDS, December 1958. Named by the UK Antarctic Place-Names Committee (UK-APC) for Martín Cortés de Albacar, Spanish author of Arte de Navegar (Sevilla, 1551), an important manual of navigation.

=== Mount Ptolemy ===
68°33′S 65°58′W. An isolated block mountain with four main summits, the highest rising to 1,370 metres (4,490 ft). It lies close north of the Traffic Circle on the northwestern side of Mercator Ice Piedmont, Antarctic Peninsula. First observed by Finn Ronne and Carl Eklund of the United States Antarctic Service, 1939-41, from their sledge route through the Traffic Circle. Surveyed by FIDS in 1947. Named by UK-APC after Claudius Ptolemy (2nd century A.D.), Egyptian mathematician, astronomer and geographer, who introduced the system of coordinates of latitude and longitude for fixing positions on the earth's surface.

=== Windy Valley ===
68°37′S 66°50′W. A glacier-filled valley opening onto the north part of Mikkelsen Bay and providing access via its head to the plateau, Lammers Glacier and the Traffic Circle area. So named by the BGLE under John Rymill, 1934-37, because of the strong winds which descend from the high plateau and blow out of this valley with great force.

== Sources ==
- Alberts, Fred G., ed. (1995), Geographic Names of the Antarctic (PDF) (2 ed.), United States Board on Geographic Names This article incorporates public domain material from websites or documents of the United States Board on Geographic Names.
- Palmer Land, USGS: United States Geological Survey, 1979

This article incorporates public domain material from websites or documents of the United States Geological Survey.
