= Hayrick Island =

Island in Graham Land, Antarctica

- Location within Antarctic Peninsula

Geography
- Location: Antarctica
- Coordinates: 68°42′S 67°32′W
- Highest elevation: 150 m (490 ft)

Administration
- Administered under the Antarctic Treaty System

Hayrick Island is a small prominent rock mass, more than 150 metres (500 ft) high, between Lodge Rock and Twig Rock in the Terra Firma Islands, off the west coast of Graham Land, Antarctica. The Terra Firma Islands were first visited and surveyed in 1936 by the British Graham Land Expedition under John Rymill. Hayrick Island was surveyed in 1948 by the Falkland Islands Dependencies Survey and so named by them because, when seen from the east, its high mass has an appearance suggesting a hayrick.

== Granaderos Refuge ==
Granaderos Refuge is an Antarctic refuge located on the Terra Firma Islands of Mikkelsen Bay on the Fallières Coast. It is operated by the Argentine Army and was inaugurated on 17 August 1957. It depends on the San Martín Base north of the refuge 66 kilometres (41 mi) faraway.

The refuge is located on the west coast of the island and owes its name in homage to the Regiment of Mounted Grenadiers that participated in the construction of the refuge.

== See also ==
- List of Antarctic and sub-Antarctic islands
- List of Antarctic field camps
