= Mount Shelby =

Mountain in Graham Land, Antarctica

Mount Shelby (68°9′S 65°50′W) is a mountain, 1,520 m, standing between Daspit Glacier and Bills Gulch at the head of Trail Inlet, on the east coast of Graham Land. Discovered by members of East Base of the United States Antarctic Service (USAS), 1939–41. It was photographed from the air in 1947 by the Ronne Antarctic Research Expedition (RARE) under Ronne, and charted in 1948 by the Falkland Islands Dependencies Survey (FIDS). Named by Ronne for Marjorie Shelby, who contributed her services as typist and editor in drafting the RARE prospectus and assisted in general expedition work prior to departure.
