= Little Thumb =

Little Thumb may refer to:

- Little Thumb (Antarctica), a rock tower in Graham Land, Antarctica
- Hop-o'-My-Thumb, hero of one of the eight fairytales published by Charles Perrault in Histoires ou Contes du temps passé.
