= Hans Wilhelmsson Ahlmann =

Swedish geographer, glaciologist and diplomat

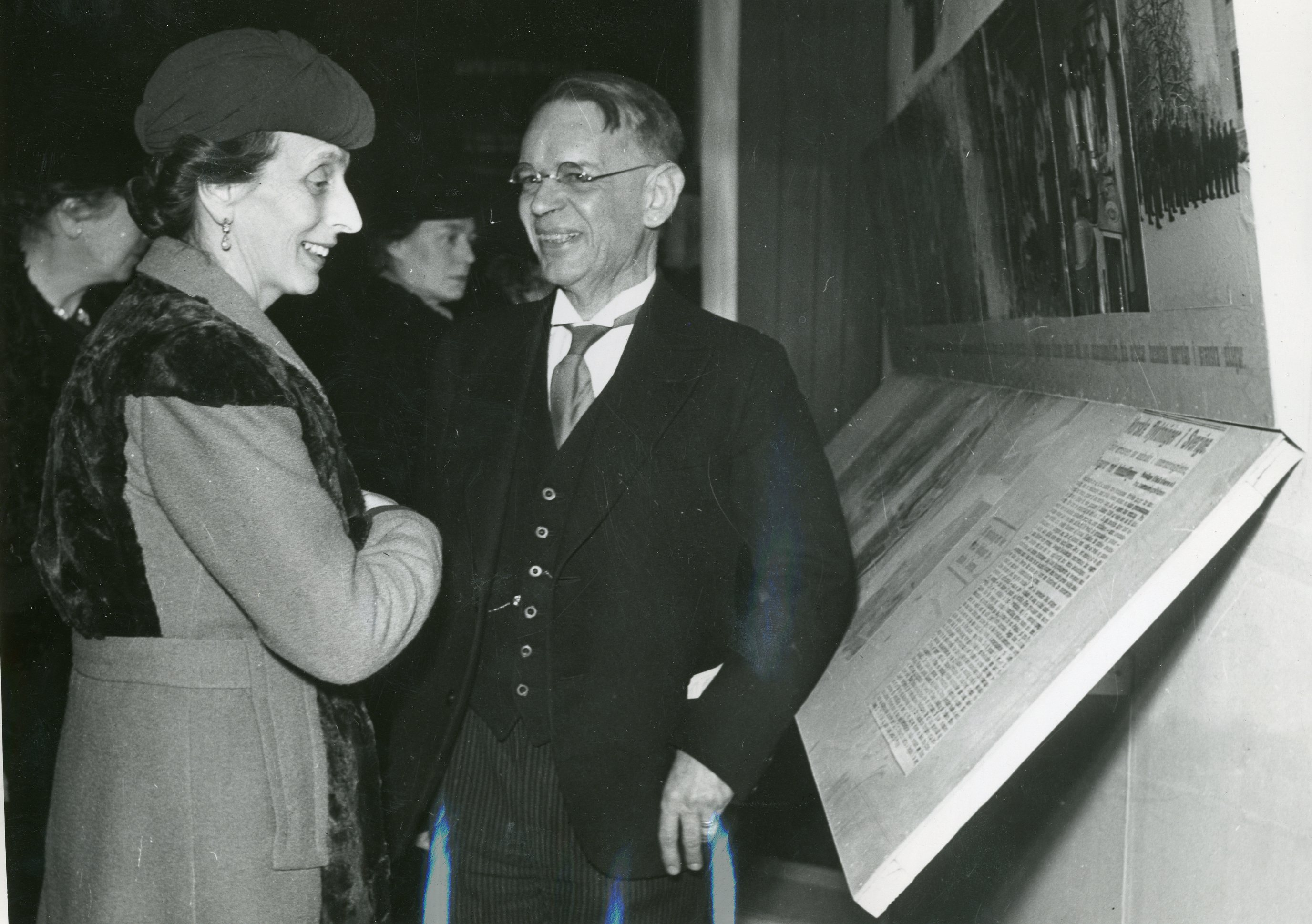
Hans Wilhelmsson Ahlmann with Princess Ingeborg of Sweden at the opening of the Norwegian Exhibition

Hans Jakob Konrad Wilhelmsson Ahlmann (14 November 1889 – 10 March 1974) was a Swedish geographer, glaciologist, and diplomat.

Born in Karlsborg, Sweden, Ahlmann grew up in Stockholm. He studied with Professor Gerard De Geer at Stockholm University, and gained his doctorate in 1915 on a doctoral thesis on Sweden's Lake Ragundasjön. The same year, he became an associate professor of geography at the University of Stockholm. He was appointed associate professor of geography at Uppsala University in 1920 and professor at the Stockholm University from 1929 until 1950.

He was a very active field worker and led an expedition to Nordaustlandet (North East Land) in the Svalbard archipelago in Norway in the spring of 1931. In 1934 he returned to Svalbard with Professor Harald Ulrik Sverdrup, this time to explore the glaciers on Vestspitsbergen. He examined the Vatnajökull (Vatna Glacier) in Iceland in 1936, and led in the winter of 1939–40 the Swedish-Norwegian study of glaciers in Greenland. In 1946, he led investigations of glaciers on Mount Kebnekaise in Sweden. He was one of the initiators of the Norwegian-British-Swedish Antarctic Expedition in 1949–1952, and leader of the expedition's Swedish committee.

In 1937 he was awarded the Hans Egede Medal by the Royal Danish Geographical Society. He was elected to the Swedish Academy of Science in 1939 and in the same year awarded the Patron's Medal of the British Royal Geographical Society. During the 1940s, Ahlmann was an international authority on the relationship between climate and glacier size, concluding that the glaciers were retreating. He was awarded the Cullum Geographical Medal of the American Geographical Society in 1950. He was a member of several other scientific academies, among them the Prussian Academy of Sciences and the Academy of Sciences Leopoldina.

Ahlmann, whose Norwegian wife gave him a good network of contacts in Norway, was a member of the Swedish-Norwegian Association during World War II, and was the 1950–1956 Swedish ambassador in Oslo. From 1956 to 1960, he served as president of the International Geographical Union.

== Legacy ==
A number of geographical features are named after him:

- Ahlmannfonna Glacier on Nordaustlandet, Svalbard
- Ahlmann Glacier in Seligmanfjorden in Antarctica
- Ahlmann Ridge in Dronning Maud Land, Antarctica

Diplomatic posts
Preceded by Johan Beck-Friis	Ambassador of Sweden to Norway; 1950–1956	Succeeded by Rolf Edberg
