= Terra Firma Islands =

Group of islands

- Location within Antarctica

Geography
- Location: Antarctica
- Coordinates: 68°42′S 67°32′W

Administration
- Administered under the Antarctic Treaty System

Demographics
- Population: Uninhabited

The Terra Firma Islands ( 68°42′S 67°32′W) are a small group of islands lying 8 nautical miles (15 km; 9.2 mi) north of Cape Berteaux, off the west coast of Graham Land in West Antarctica.

== Location ==
Fallières Coast on Antarctic Peninsula.

The Terra Firma Islands are just west of Mikkelsen Bay, in the east of the larger Marguerite Bay in Graham Land on the Fallières Coast of the Antarctic Peninsula. They are northwest of Cape Berteaux, the southern end of the bay's mouth. Alamode Island is the largest of the group, in the southeast. Other islands and rocks, from west to east, include Dumbbell Island, Barn Rock, Lodge Rock, Pigmy Rock, Hayrick Island and Twig Rock.

The Terra Firma islands are the southernmost point in the world where grass (Deschampsia antarctica) and flowers (Colobanthus quitensis) grow naturally. On 17 August 1957 personnel from the Argentine San Martín Base on Barry Island established a hut on the west side of Hayrick Island, named "Refugio Granaderos" for the Horse Grenadier Regiment (Regimiento de Granaderos a Caballo) who built it.

== Exploration and name ==
The Terra Firma Islands were roughly surveyed by the British Graham Land expedition (BGLE) under John Rymill in 1936. The name "Terra Firma Island" was applied to the largest island (Alamode Island), because a BGLE depot-laying party camped there following the break-up of sea ice, but the name Terra Firma Islands was later applied to the whole group.

== Features ==
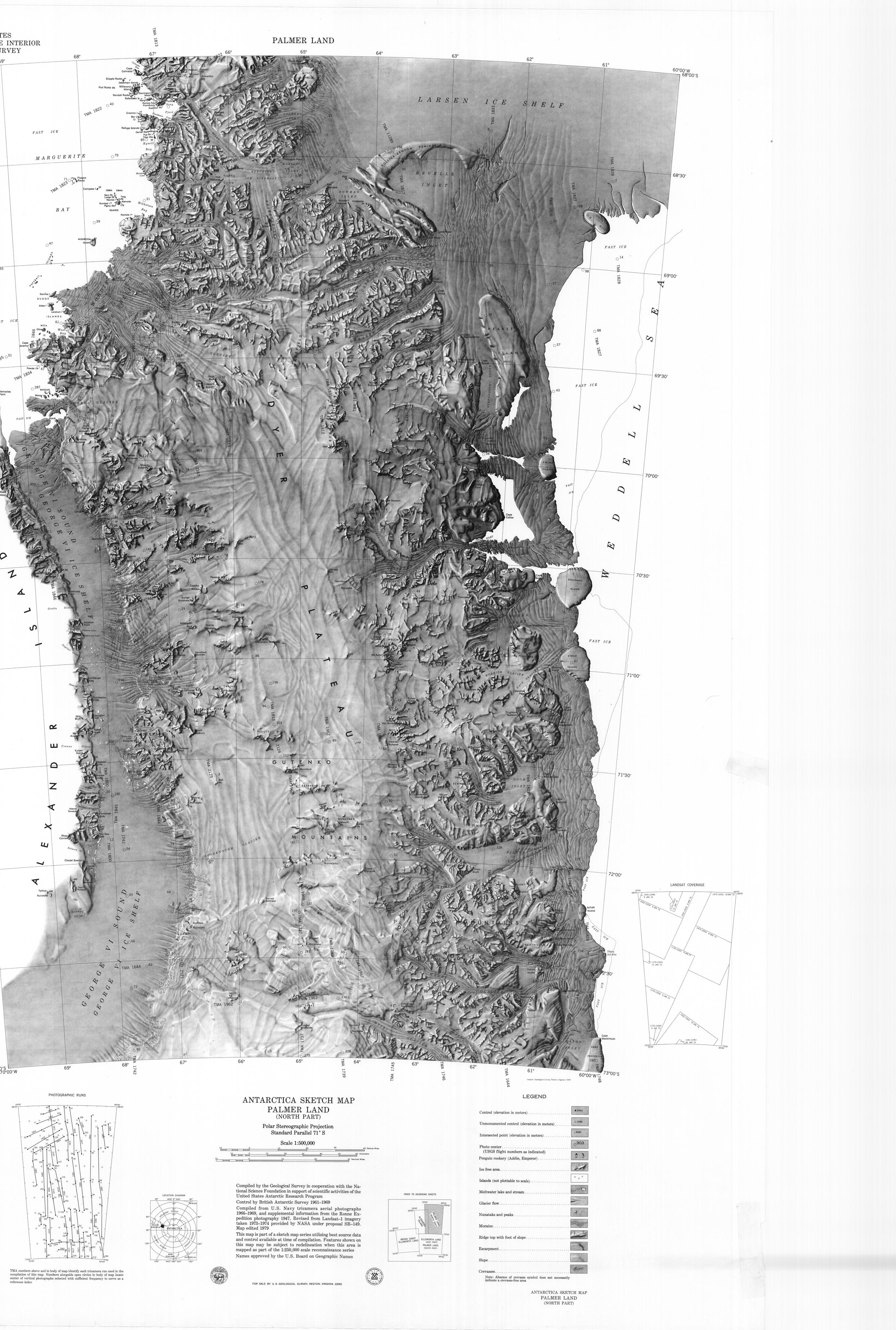
Northern Palmer Land. Mikkelsen Bay in northwest of map

=== Alamode Island ===
68°43′S 67°32′W. The largest and southeasternmost of the Terra Firma Islands, with steep rocky cliffs surmounted by a rock and snow cone rising to 320 metres (1,050 ft) high. So named by the FIDS, following a 1948 resurvey, for its resemblance to some form of confection served with ice cream on it.

=== Dumbbell Island ===
68°43′S 67°35′W. A low rocky island lying 1 nautical mile (1.9 km; 1.2 mi) west of Alamode Island. The island was surveyed in 1948 by the FIDS, who so named it because of its shape.

=== Barn Rock ===
68°41′S 67°32′W. A prominent rock, more than 90 metres (300 ft) high, near the north end of the Terra Firma Islands. Resurveyed in 1948 by the FIDS who so named the rock because of its appearance when seen from the west.

=== Lodge Rock ===
68°41′S 67°32′W. A low, snow-capped rock, less than 30 metres (98 ft) high, between Barn Rock and Hayrick Island. This rock was surveyed in 1948 by the Falkland Islands Dependencies Survey (FIDS), and so named by them because a low ledge onto which sledges could be driven provided lodgment clear of the sea ice pressure area.

=== Pigmy Rock ===
68°43′S 67°33′W. A rock lying close off the southwest side of Alamode Island at the south extremity of the Terra Firma Islands. This rock was surveyed in 1948 by the FIDS, who so named it because of its size.

=== Hayrick Island ===
68°42′S 67°32′W. A small prominent rock mass, more than 150 metres (490 ft) high, between Lodge Rock and Twig Rock. This island was surveyed in 1948 by the FIDS and so named by them because, when seen from the E, its high mass has an appearance suggesting a hayrick.

=== Twig Rock ===
68°42′S 67°32′W. A small rocky mass, more than 90 metres (300 ft) high, between Alamode Island and Hayrick Island. Twig Rock was surveyed in 1948 by the FIDS, who so named it because of the branching nature of the dike system exposed on its north face.

== Sources ==
- Alberts, Fred G., ed. (1995), Geographic Names of the Antarctic (PDF) (2 ed.), United States Board on Geographic Names This article incorporates public domain material from websites or documents of the United States Board on Geographic Names.
- Frozen Under, National Geographic Magazine, archived from the original on 14 December 2007
- Hayrick Island, AADC: Australian Antarctic Data Centre
- Palmer Land, USGS: United States Geological Survey

This article incorporates public domain material from websites or documents of the United States Geological Survey.
