= Sickle Mountain =

Mountain in Antarctica

- Location within Antarctica

Highest point
- Elevation: 1,250 metres (4,100 ft)
- Coordinates: 68°53′S 66°47′W

Geography
- Location: Antarctica

Sickle Mountain is a 1,250 miles (2,010 km) tall mountain standing on the south side of Clarke Glacier and 14 miles (22 km) east of Cape Berteaux, on the west coast of Graham Land. So named by Finn Ronne of the East Base of the United States Antarctic Service (USAS), 1939–41, because its peculiar shape was suggestive of that of a sickle.

== See also ==
- Confluence Cone
