= Confluence Cone =

Nunatak near the west coast of the Antarctic Peninsula

Confluence Cone (68°56′S 66°40′W) is a small but conspicuous nunatak 4 nautical miles (7 km) southeast of Sickle Mountain, near the west coast of the Antarctic Peninsula. It was photographed from the air by the Ronne Antarctic Research Expedition in 1947. It was surveyed from the ground by the Falkland Islands Dependencies Survey in 1958, and so named by the UK Antarctic Place-Names Committee because of its position at the confluence of several glaciers which merge with Hariot Glacier to flow into the Wordie Ice Shelf.
