= Rymill Bay =

Bay along the west coast of Graham Land, Antarctica

- Location within Antarctica
- Location: Fallières Coast, Antarctic Peninsula, Antarctica
- Coordinates: 68°24′S 67°05′W
- Ocean/sea sources: Marguerite Bay, Southern Ocean

Rymill Bay (68°24′S 67°05′W) is a bay, 9 nautical miles (17 km; 10 mi) wide at its mouth and indenting 5 nautical miles (9.3 km; 5.8 mi) between Red Rock Ridge and Bertrand Ice Piedmont along the west coast of Graham Land, Antarctica.

== Location ==
Fallières Coast on Antarctic Peninsula.

Rymill Bay is in the east of the larger Marguerite Bay in Graham Land on the Fallières Coast of the Antarctic Peninsula. It is south of Neny Fjord, west of Hadley Upland and north of Mikkelsen Bay. The Bertrand Ice Piedmond extends along its south shore, fed by Martin Glacier. Further north the bay is fed by Romulus Glacier. Red Bay is just north of the bay. Islands and rocks include Bar Island, off Red Bay, Refuge Islands, Garnet Rocks, Breccia Island, Pup Rock and Tiber Rocks.

== Exploration and name ==
Rymill Bay was probably first seen from a distance by the French Antarctic Expedition (FrAE) under Jean-Baptiste Charcot in 1909. The bay was first surveyed in 1936 by the British Graham Land Expedition (BGLE) and was resurveyed in 1948 by the Falkland Islands Dependencies Survey (FIDS). The name, proposed by members of the BGLE is for John Riddoch Rymill, Australian leader of the British Graham Land Expedition, 1934-37.

== Features ==
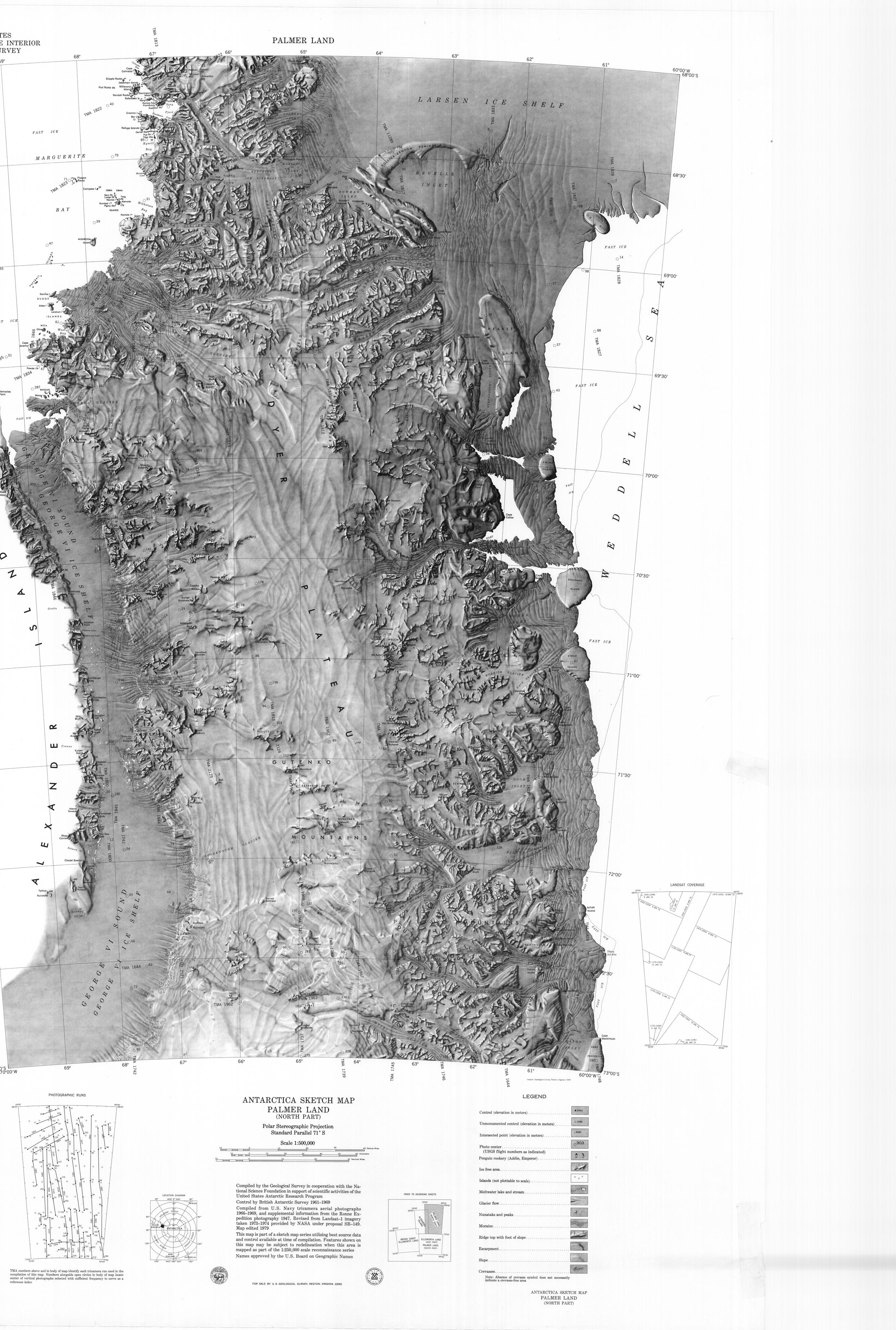
Northern Palmer Land. Rymill Bay in northwest of map

Features and nearby features include:

=== Bertrand Ice Piedmond ===
68°30′S 67°00′W. An ice piedmont about 11 nautical miles (20 km; 13 mi) long and from 3 to 5 nautical miles (5.6 to 9.3 km; 3.5 to 5.8 mi) wide, lying between Rymill Bay and Mikkelsen Bay. It is bounded on the southeast side by Pavie Ridge and on the northeast side by Black Thumb. Surveyed in 1936 by the BGLE under Rymill, and resurveyed in 1948-49 by the FIDS. Named by UK Antarctic Place-Names Committee (UK-APC) after Kenneth J. Bertrand (1910-78), professor of geography, the Catholic University of America, Washington, DC. A geomorphologist and Antarctic historian, Bertrand was a member of the United States Advisory Committee on Antarctic Names, 1947-73; chairman, 1962-73. His Americans in Antarctica, 1775-1948, published in 1971, is the most extensive and authoritative account of American involvement in the Antarctic.

=== Martin Glacier ===
68°29′S 66°53′W. A glacier, 3 nautical miles (5.6 km; 3.5 mi) wide and 9 nautical miles (17 km; 10 mi) long, which flows west and then northwest from the south side of Mount Lupa to the southeast corner of Rymill Bay where it joins the Bertrand Ice Piedmont. First surveyed in 1936 by the BGLE under Rymill. Resurveyed in 1948-49 by the FIDS and named for James H. Martin, member of the British Australian and New Zealand Antarctic Research Expedition (BANZARE) under Douglas Mawson, 1929-31, and first mate of the Penola during the BGLE, 1934-37.

=== Romulus Glacier ===
68°23′S 66°55′W. A glacier, 7 nautical miles (13 km; 8.1 mi) long and 2 nautical miles (3.7 km; 2.3 mi) wide, which flows from the north slopes of Mount Lupa westward to Rymill Bay between the Blackwall Mountains and Black Thumb. First surveyed in 1936 by the BGLE under Rymill. Resurveyed in 1948-49 by the FIDS, who so named it for its association with Remus Glacier, whose head lies near the head of this glacier.

=== Red Bay ===
68°18′S 67°11′W. A small, open bay lying close south of the west extremity of Red Rock Ridge, along the west coast of Graham Land. First surveyed in 1936 by the BGLE under Rymill. The bay was resurveyed in 1948-49 by the FIDS, and so named by them for its association with Red Rock Ridge.

== Islands ==
=== Bar Island ===
68°17′S 67°12′W. A long, low, rocky islet lying 0.25 nautical miles (0.46 km; 0.29 mi) off the west end of Red Rock Ridge. First roughly surveyed in 1936 by the BGLE under John Rymill. Resurveyed in 1948-49 by the FIDS, who so named the islet because of its shape.

=== Refuge Islands ===
68°21′S 67°10′W. A small group of islands lying 1 nautical mile (1.9 km; 1.2 mi) from the ice cliffs at the southwest side of Red Rock Ridge. Discovered and named by the BGLE under Rymill, 1934-37, who used these islands as a depot for sledge journeys south from the southern base in the Debenham Islands.

=== Garnet Rocks ===
68°21′S 67°04′W. A group of three rocks lying 2 nautical miles (3.7 km; 2.3 mi) east of the Refuge Islands in the north part of Rymill Bay. First surveyed in 1948-49 by the FIDS and so named by them because of the occurrence of garnet in the rocks.

=== Breccia Island ===
68°22′S 67°01′W. A small low island lying 1 nautical mile (1.9 km; 1.2 mi) northwest of Tiber Rocks in the north part of Rymill Bay. Photographed by Ronne Antarctic Research Expedition (RARE) in November 1947 (trimetrogon air photography). So named by RARE geologist Robert L. Nichols because the country rock is a plutonic breccia.

=== Pup Rock ===
68°22′S 67°03′W. A rock about 200 metres (660 ft) high in diameter, between Refuge Islands and Tiber Rocks in Rymill Bay. Discovered by geologist Robert L. Nichols of RARE, 1947-48, who applied the name "Three Pup Island." The name has been shortened for the sake of brevity.

=== Tiber Rocks ===
68°23′S 67°00′W. A group of rocks lying near the head of Rymill Bay, close west of the mouth of Romulus Glacier and 3 nautical miles (5.6 km; 3.5 mi) northwest of the highest summit of Black Thumb. First seen and roughly surveyed in 1936 by the BGLE under John Rymill. Resurveyed in 1948-49 by the FIDS, and so named by them because of the association of these rocks with nearby Romulus and Remus Glaciers.

== Sources ==
- Alberts, Fred G., ed. (1995), Geographic Names of the Antarctic (PDF) (2 ed.), United States Board on Geographic Names This article incorporates public domain material from websites or documents of the United States Board on Geographic Names.
- Palmer Land, USGS: United States Geological Survey

This article incorporates public domain material from websites or documents of the United States Geological Survey.
