= Blackface Point =

Headland in Antarctica

Blackface Point (67°57′S 65°24′W) is a rocky and precipitous headland 3 nautical miles (6 km) northwest of Cape Freeman on the east coast of Graham Land. The point was photographed by the United States Antarctic Service, 1939–41, and mapped by the Falkland Islands Dependencies Survey, 1947–48. It was named by the UK Antarctic Place-Names Committee in description of the extremely black rock exposed at the end of the point.
