= Cape Freeman (Graham Land) =

Cape on the coast of Graham Land, Antarctica

Cape Freeman (67°59′S 62°20′W) is a cape marking the east end of the peninsula separating Seligman Inlet and Trail Inlet, on the east coast of Graham Land, Antarctica. The cape was photographed from the air in 1940 by the U.S. Antarctic Service. It was charted in 1947 by the Falkland Islands Dependencies Survey (FIDS), who named it for R.L. Freeman, a FIDS surveyor at the Stonington Island base.

The cape was probably first sighted by the Australian polar explorer Hubert Wilkins during his flight on December 20, 1928. The first aerial photographs were taken during a flight over it by the American polar explorer Lincoln Ellsworth in 1935, and served as a model for a map by the geographer WLG Joerg. Further aerial photographs were taken by scientists from the United States Antarctic Service Expedition (1939–1941) in 1940. The Falkland Islands Dependencies Survey carried out a geodetic survey in 1947 and named the cape after Reginald Leonard Freeman (1913–1988), a surveyor for the survey on Stonington Island.

== See also ==
- Blackface Point
