= Ahlmann Glacier =

Glacier in Antarctica

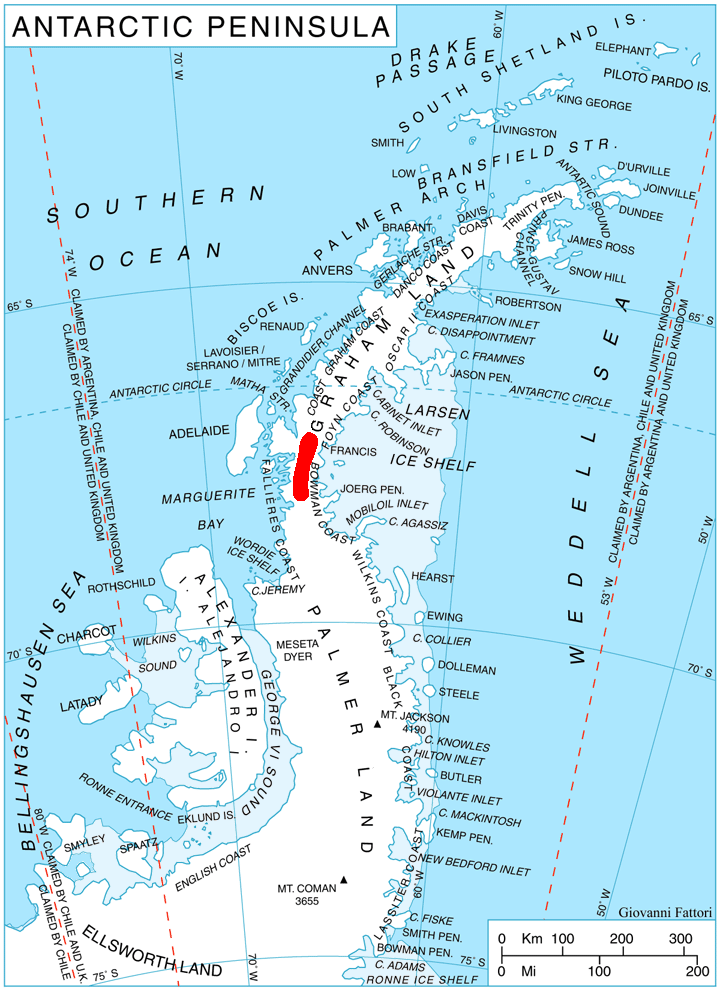
- Location of Hemimont Plateau on the Antarctic Peninsula

- Location within Antarctica
- Location: Graham Land
- Coordinates: 67°52′S 65°45′W
- Thickness: unknown
- Highest elevation: 404 m (1,325 ft)
- Terminus: Seligman Inlet
- Status: unknown

Ahlmann Glacier (67°52′S 65°45′W) is the southernmost of two glaciers on the east side of Hemimont Plateau flowing east into Seligman Inlet on Bowman Coast, Graham Land in Antarctica.

== History ==
The glacier was photographed from the air in 1940 by the United States Antarctic Service, and was charted in 1947 by the Falkland Islands Dependencies Survey, who named it for Professor Hans Wilhelmsson Ahlmann, a Swedish glaciologist and geographer.

== See also ==
- List of glaciers in the Antarctic
