= Rhamnus (Crete) =

Coordinates: 35°19′19″N 23°32′21″E

Rhamnus or Rhamnous (Ancient Greek: Ῥαμνοῦς) was a harbour on the west coast of ancient Crete near the promontory Chersonesus. Pliny the Elder, on the contrary, places it in the interior of the island.

The site of Rhamnus is located at Ormos Stomiou.
