= Godfrey Upland =

Godfrey Upland (68°44′S 66°23′W) is a small remnant plateau with an undulating surface and a mean elevation of 1,500 metres (5,000 ft) in south-central Graham Land, Antarctica. It is bounded by Clarke, Meridian, Lammers and Cole Glaciers. The existence of the feature was known to the United States Antarctic Service, 1939–41, Finn Ronne and Carl R. Eklund having traveled along Meridian and Lammers Glaciers in January 1941. It was photographed from the air by the Ronne Antarctic Research Expedition in 1947 and surveyed from the ground by the Falkland Islands Dependencies Survey in 1958. It was named by the UK Antarctic Place-Names Committee after Thomas Godfrey, an American glassworker and mathematician who, at the same time as John Hadley, independently invented the quadrant (the forerunner of the sextant), in 1730.
