= Bills Gulch =

Glacier in Graham Land, Antarctica

Bills Gulch Glacier
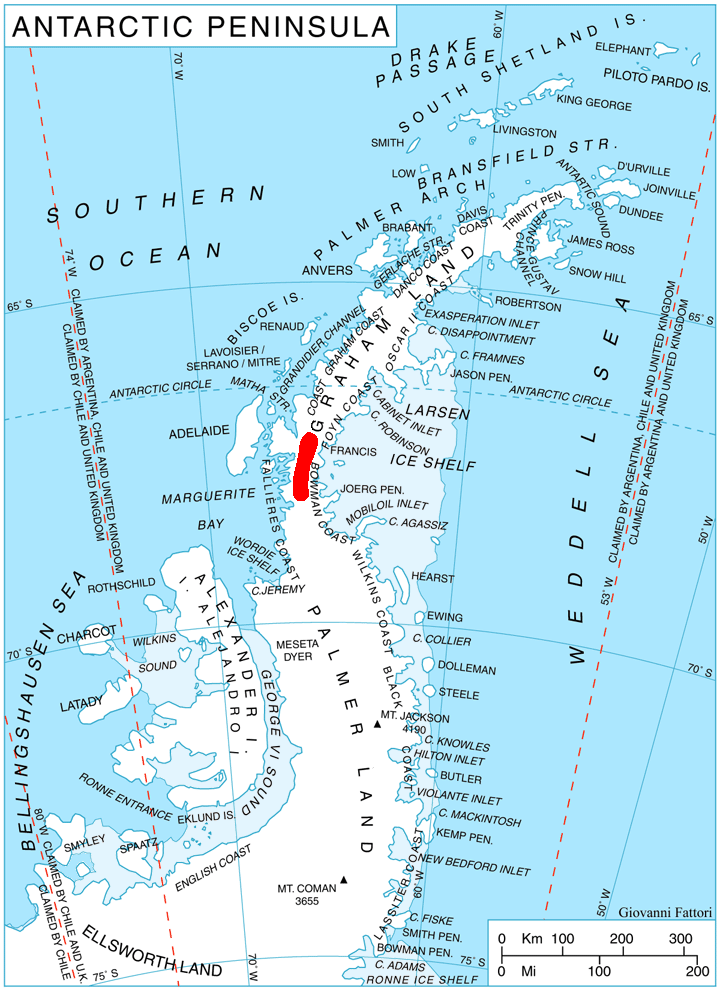
- Location of Hemimont Plateau on the Antarctic Peninsula

- Location within Antarctica
- Location: Graham Land
- Coordinates: 68°5′00″S 65°50′00″W
- Thickness: unknown
- Terminus: Trail Inlet
- Status: unknown

Bills Gulch (68°5′S 65°50′W) is a glacier on the southeast side of Hemimont Plateau, the northern of two glaciers flowing east from the plateau upland into the head of Trail Inlet, on the east coast of Graham Land. This glacier was used by the sledge party under Paul H. Knowles which traversed the Antarctic Peninsula from the East Base of the United States Antarctic Service (USAS) on its way to Hilton Inlet in 1940. It was named by USAS for a lead dog that died at this point. The unlikely name has been approved because of its wide use on maps and in reports.

== Chacabuco Refuge ==
Refuge Chacabuco (68°06′00″S 66°31′00″W) is an Antarctic refuge close to the San Martín Base, on which it depends. It is located in the area of the Bills Gulch glacier, on the Fallières Coast in the Antarctic Peninsula, and is administered by the Argentine Army.

The refuge was inaugurated on November 21, 1956, as logistical support and is the one located at the highest altitude of all the Argentine Antarctica, at about 1,535 metres (5,036 ft) above sea level on the route that leads to the Weddell Sea.

In 1956, during the building of the San Martin base, the Argentine Army installed three refuges to have logistical support from Marguerite Bay, in the Bellingshausen Sea, to the Mobiloil Inlet in the Weddell Sea, crossing the Antarctic Peninsula from west to east. The three refuges were the Chacabuco, the Yapeyú and the Maipo. The work requested 63 days, travelling about 786 kilometres (488 mi) using sled pulled by dogs. For the construction of the Chacabuco refuge, the army team made 17 trips from the Yapeyú refuge. Trips were hampered by the slopes of the area, the presence of ice and wind storms that exceeded 200 kilometres per hour.

The refuge was used for scientific tasks carried out during the International Geophysical Year in 1957 and 1958. It has food, equipment and food for men and dog, medicines and fuel.

== See also ==
- List of glaciers in the Antarctic
- Glaciology
- List of Antarctic research stations
- List of Antarctic field camps
