= Seligman Inlet =

Body of water in Graham Land, Antarctica

Seligman Inlet (67°50′S 65°30′W) is a broad inlet which recedes inland for 6 nautical miles (11 km) between Choyce Point and Cape Freeman on the east coast of Graham Land. The inlet was photographed from the air by the United States Antarctic Service (USAS) in 1940. It was charted by the Falkland Islands Dependencies Survey (FIDS) in 1947 and named for Gerald Seligman, founder and president of the British Glaciological Society.
