= Neny Fjord =

Bay on the west coast of Graham Land, Antarctica

- Location within Antarctica
- Location: Fallières Coast, Antarctic Peninsula, Antarctica
- Coordinates: 68°16′S 66°50′W
- Ocean/sea sources: Marguerite Bay, Southern Ocean

Neny Fjord (68°16′S 66°50′W) is a bay, 10 nautical miles (19 km; 12 mi) long in an east–west direction and 5 nautical miles (9.3 km; 5.8 mi) wide, between Red Rock Ridge and Roman Four Promontory on the west coast of Graham Land, Antarctica.

== Location ==
Fallières Coast on Antarctic Peninsula.

Neny Fjord is in the east of the larger Marguerite Bay in Graham Land on the Fallières Coast of the Antarctic Peninsula. It is south of Stonington Island (home of East Base) and Northeast Glacier, west of Trail Inlet and Solberg Inlet, and north of Red Rock Ridge, Hadley Upland and Rymill Bay. Glaciers feeding the fjord are, from south to north, Remus Glacier, Snowshoe Glacier and Neny Glacier. Features of the shore include Providence Cove, Mount Dudley, Billycock Hill, Mount Rhamnus, Mount Nemesis, and Roman Four Promontary. Neny Bay is just north of the fjord. Islands and rocks include Gremlin Island, Pyrox Island and Postillion Rock. Neny Island is just north of the fjord's mouth.

== Exploration and name ==
This coast was first explored in 1909 by Dr. Jean-Baptiste Charcot who, it appears, gave this name to a feature somewhat north of the bay described. The British Graham Land Expedition (BGLE) made a detailed survey of this area in 1936–1937, and in correlating their work with that of Charcot applied the name Neny Fjord to the bay between Red Rock Ridge and Roman Four Promontory. The name has become established in this latter position through international acceptance and use.

== Glaciers ==
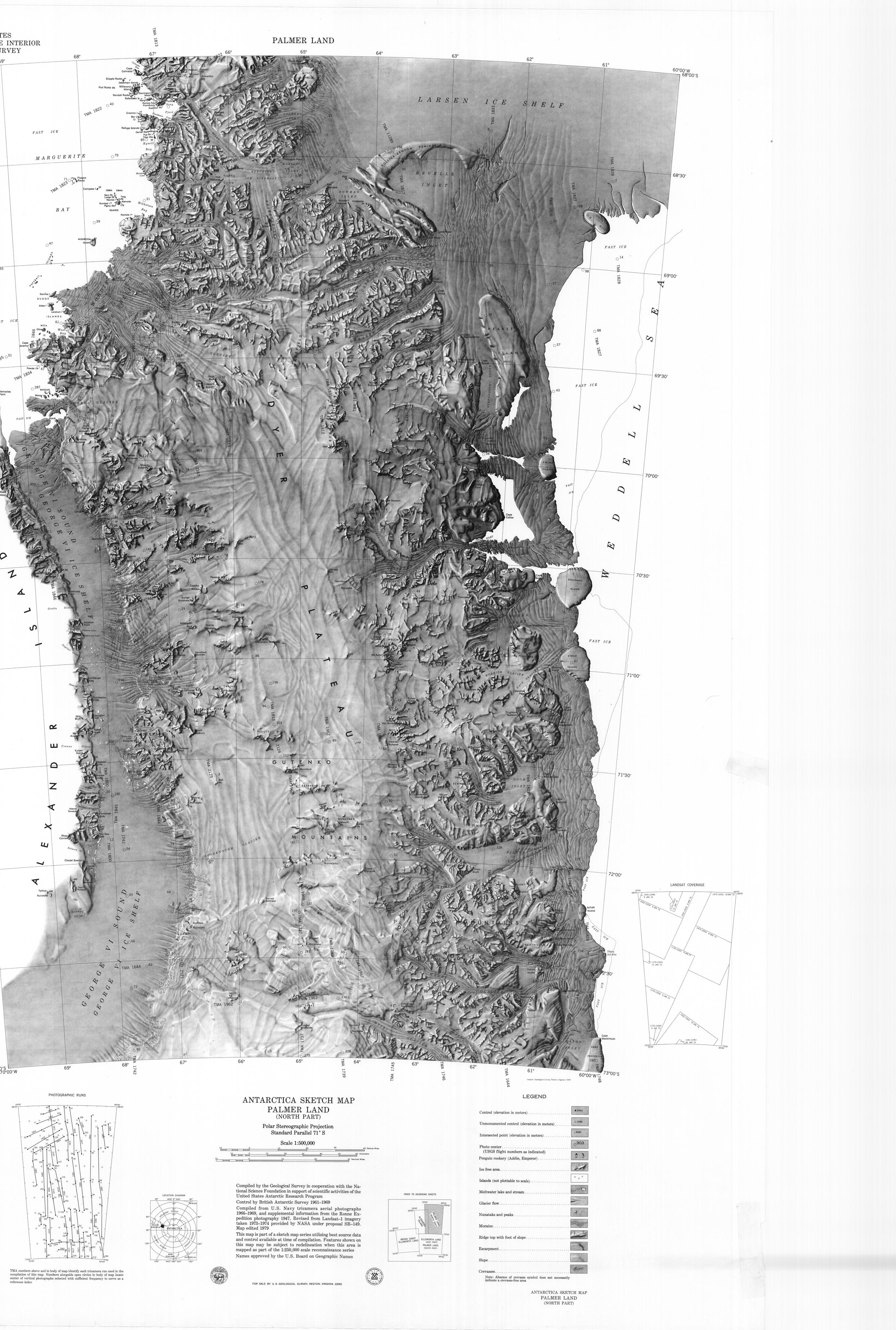
Northern Palmer Land. Neny Fjord in northwest of map

Glaciers feeding Neny Fjord and Neny Bay include:

=== Remus Glacier ===
68°20′S 66°43′W. A glacier, 8 nautical miles (15 km; 9.2 mi) long, which flows from the north slopes of Mount Lupa northwestward along the northeast side of the Blackwall Mountains into Providence Cove, Neny Fjord. The lower reaches of the glacier were first roughly surveyed in 1936 by the BGLE under John Rymill. Resurveyed in 1948–49 by the FIDS, who so named it for its association with Romulus Glacier, whose head lies near the head of this glacier.

=== Snowshoe Glacier ===
68°19′S 66°35′W. A glacier 8 nautical miles (15 km; 9.2 mi) long flowing west from a col in the southwest flank of Neny Glacier into Neny Fjord. Roughly surveyed from the ground (1936) and photographed from the air (1937) by BGLE. Surveyed by the Falkland Islands Dependencies Survey (FIDS) in 1949. The name was suggested by K.S.P. Butler of the FIDS in 1948 because the shape of the glacier with its narrow head and wide mouth resembles a snowshoe.

=== Neny Glacier ===
68°15′S 66°25′W. A glacier flowing northwest into the north part of Neny Fjord. This feature together with Gibbs Glacier, which flows southeast, occupy a transverse depression between Neny Fjord and Mercator Ice Piedmont on the east side of the Antarctic Peninsula. The name Neny Glacier, derived from association with Neny Fjord, was first used by the United States Antarctic Service (USAS), 1939-41, whose members used the glacier as a sledging route.

=== Centurion Glacier ===
68°12′S 66°56′W. Small steep glacier flowing northwest to Neny Bay between Mount Nemesis and Roman Four Promontory. First roughly surveyed in 1936 by the BGLE under John Rymill. Resurveyed in 1947 by the FIDS. The name, given by FIDS, derives from association with Roman Four Promontory.

== Coastal features ==
Coastal features, from south to north, include:

=== Providence Cove ===
68°19′S 66°47′W. Cove bounded by ice cliffs which lies at the foot of Remus Glacier in the southeast corner of Neny Fjord. First roughly surveyed in 1936 by the BGLE under Rymill. It was resurveyed in 1940-41 by members of the USAS, and so named by them because on first arrival it seemed providential that a site for the East Base was found so quickly and easily. It was soon determined, however, that the cove did not provide a suitable site for the base.

=== Mount Dudley ===
68°16′S 66°30′W. A mountain over 1,375 metres (4,511 ft) high, standing at the head of Neny Fjord and bounded on the north and east sides by Neny Glacier. The west side of this mountain was first roughly surveyed in 1936 by the British Graham Land expedition (BGLE) under John Rymill. It was surveyed in entirety in 1940 by the USAS. The feature was photographed from the air and ground by the Ronne Antarctic Research Expedition (RARE), 1947–48, under Ronne, who named it for Harold M. Dudley, executive secretary of the American Council of Commercial Laboratories, Inc., Washington, DC, who procured various types of equipment and arranged financial aid for RARE.

=== Billycock Hill ===
68°10′S 66°33′W. A rounded, ice-covered hill which rises to 1,630 metres (5,350 ft) high and projects 180 metres (590 ft) high above the surrounding ice sheet, situated close north of the head of Neny Glacier. First surveyed by the USAS, 1939-41. Resurveyed in 1946 by the FIDS and named by them for its resemblance to a billycock hat.

=== Mount Rhamnus ===
68°11′S 66°50′W. A mountain, 865 metres (2,838 ft) high, which lies 2 nautical miles (3.7 km; 2.3 mi) northeast of Mount Nemesis on the north side of Neny Fjord. Seen from the W, it appears as a mainly snow-covered pyramid. First surveyed in 1936 by the BGLE under Rymill. Resurveyed in 1947 by the FIDS who named the mountain for its association with Mount Nemesis. According to the mythological story, the Greek goddess Nemesis had a celebrated sanctuary at Rhamnus in Attica.

=== Mount Nemesis ===
68°12′S 66°54′W. A mountain, 790 metres (2,590 ft) high, which lies 2 nautical miles (3.7 km; 2.3 mi) northeast of the seaward extremity of Roman Four Promontory and close north of Neny Fjord. First surveyed in 1936 by the BGLE under John Rymill. The name is believed to have been given by members of the USAS, 1939–41.

=== Roman Four Promontory ===
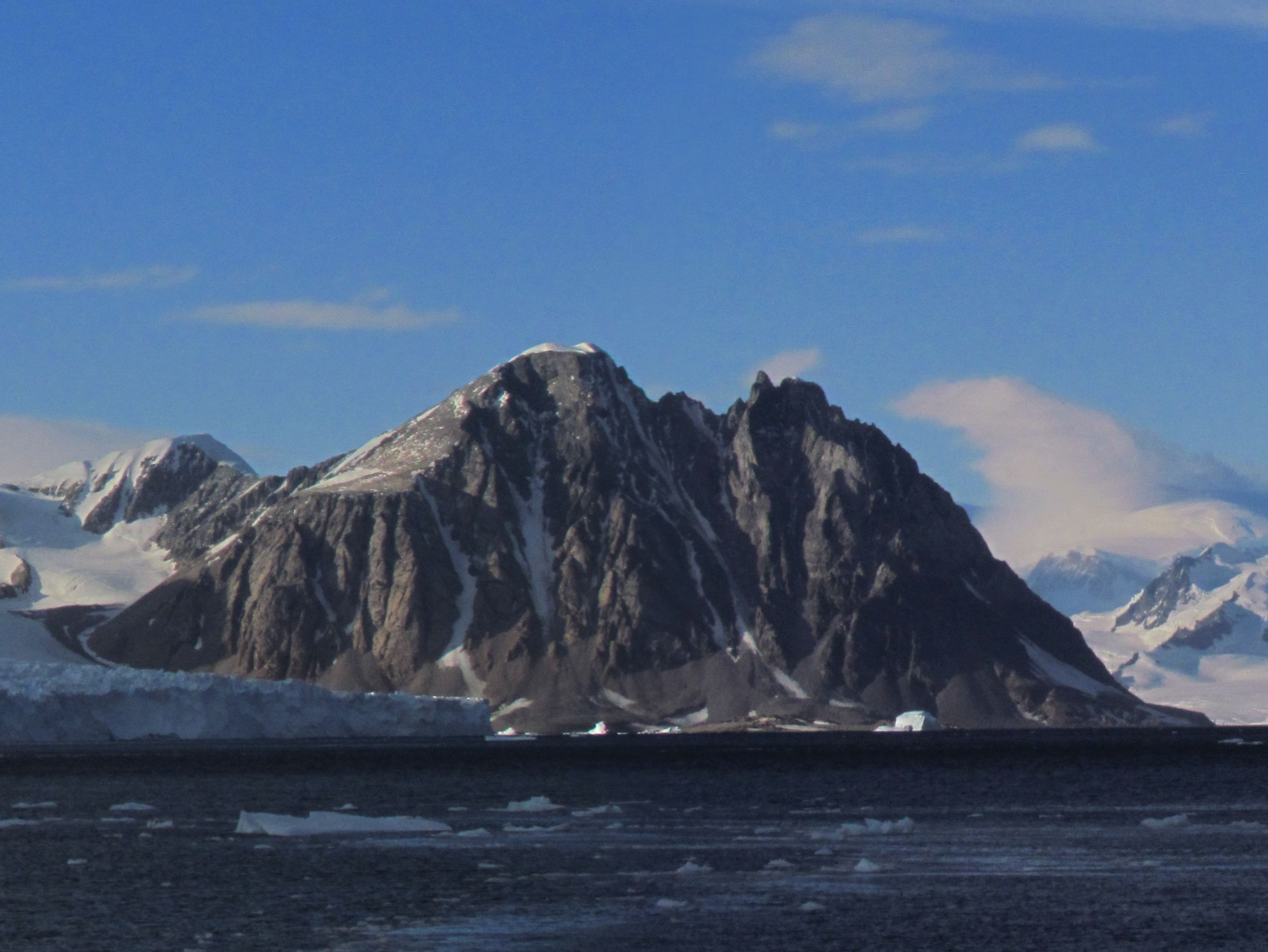
Roman Four Promontory as seen from San Martín Base

68°13′S 66°56′W. A rocky promontory rising to 830 metres (2,720 ft) high, marking the north side of the entrance to Neny Fjord. First charted by the BGLE, 1934-37, under John Rymill. The name was given by members of East Base of the USAS, 1939-41, whose base was located on nearby Stonington Island, and derives from snow-filled clefts along the face of the promontory giving the appearance of a Roman numeral IV.

=== Neny Bay ===
68°12′S 66°58′W. A small indentation in the west coast of Graham Land which is bounded on the west by Neny Island, and on the northwest and southeast respectively by Stonington Island and Roman Four Promontory. The bay was first charted by the BGLE under Rymill, 1934-37. The name, derived from Neny Island, was suggested by members of East Base of the USAS, 1939–41, who referred to it as Neny Island Bay.

== Islands ==
Island in the fjord or the bay to the north include, from south to north:

=== Gremlin Island ===
68°16′S 67°12′W. A small rocky island which lies close northwest of the tip of Red Rock Ridge. First surveyed in 1936 by the BGLE under Rymill. The island was used as a site for a depot by FIDS in 1948-49, and was so named by them because of the mysterious disappearance of a ration box left there by a FIDS sledging party.

=== Pyrox Island ===
68°12′S 66°41′W. An island lying at the head of Neny Fjord, along the west coast of Graham Land. First surveyed by the USAS, 1939-41. Resurveyed in 1949 by the FIDS, who so named it because of pyroxenic rocks found there.

=== Postillion Rock ===
68°14′S 66°53′W. A small ice-free rock in the north part of Neny Fjord, lying close south of Roman Four Promontory. First surveyed in 1936 by the BGLE under Rymill. Resurveyed in 1949 by the FIDS and so named by them because of its outlying position.

=== Beaumont Island ===
68°12′S 66°57′W. A low, rocky island in Neny Bay, about 0.4 nautical miles (0.74 km; 0.46 mi) from the mouth of Centurion Glacier. The island was presumably first sighted in 1936 by the BGLE, and was roughly charted by them and by the USAS, 1939–41. It was surveyed in 1946 by the FIDS, who named it for the Port of Beaumont, Texas, ship of the Ronne Antarctic Research Expedition (RARE) under Finn Ronne, which wintered nearby in Back Bay during 1947.

=== Fitzroy Island ===
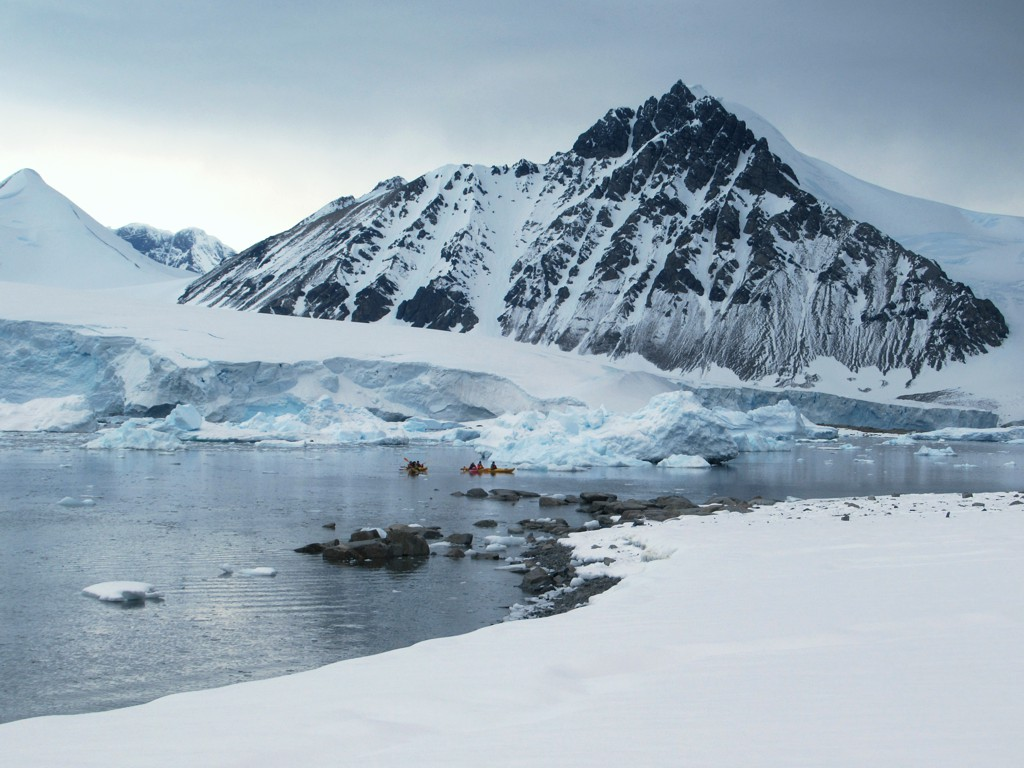
Northeast Glacier (left) and Fitzroy Island (right) are just across Back Bay from Stonington Island

68°11′S 66°58′W. An island 0.5 nautical miles (0.93 km; 0.58 mi) east of the south tip of Stonington Island, lying in Neny Bay at the foot of Northeast Glacier, by which it is partially covered. The island was presumably first sighted in 1936 by the BGLE, and was roughly charted by them and by the US AS, 1939-41. It was surveyed in 1947 by the FIDS who named it for the RMS Fitzroy, a FIDS ship which visited this area in 1947.

=== Trepassey Island ===
68°12′S 66°59′W. A small rocky island 0.6 nautical miles (1.1 km; 0.69 mi) southeast of Stonington Island in Neny Bay. Several islands were roughly charted in the area by the BGLE, 1934-37, and by the USAS, 1939–41. They were surveyed in 1947 by the FIDS and named for the M.V. Trepassey, a ship used by the FIDS in establishing a base on Stonington Island in 1946.

=== Neny Island ===
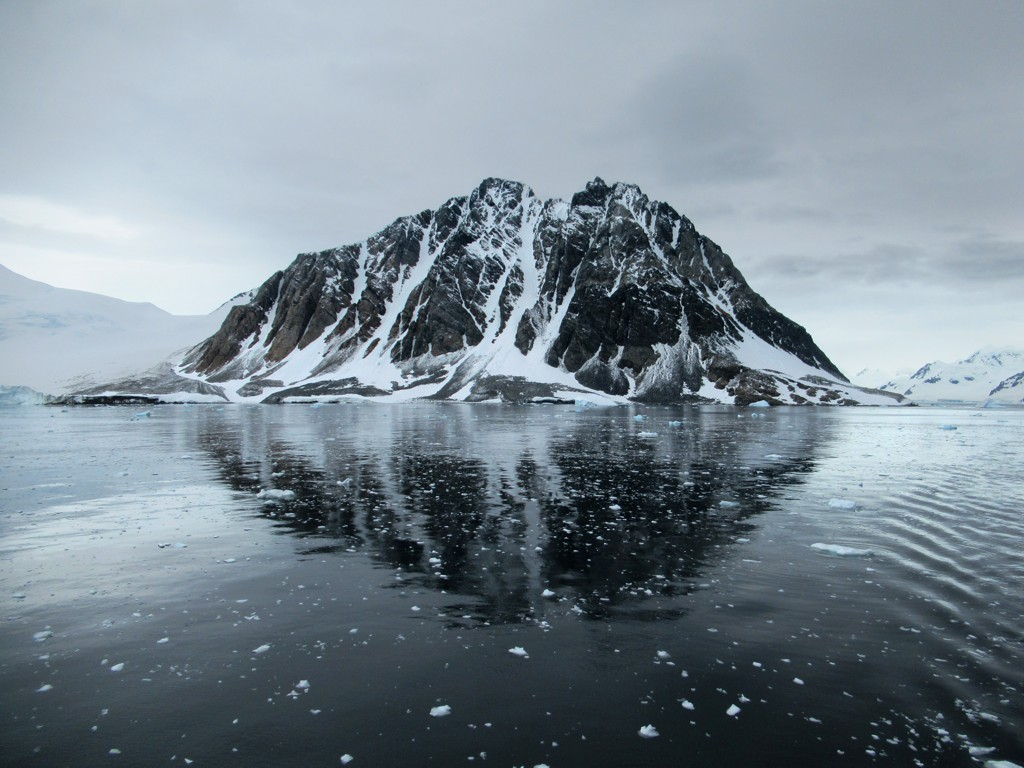
Neny Island

68°12′S 67°03′W. An island 1.5 nautical miles (2.8 km; 1.7 mi) long which rises to 675 metres (2,215 ft) high, lying 1 nautical mile (1.9 km; 1.2 mi) northwest of Roman Four Promontory and directly north of the mouth of Neny Fjord. Discovered by the BGLE under Rymill, 1934-37, and named after nearby Neny Fjord.

== Sources ==
- Alberts, Fred G., ed. (1995), Geographic Names of the Antarctic (PDF) (2 ed.), United States Board on Geographic Names This article incorporates public domain material from websites or documents of the United States Board on Geographic Names.
- Palmer Land, USGS: United States Geological Survey

This article incorporates public domain material from websites or documents of the United States Geological Survey.
