= Mikkelsen Bay =

Bay along the west coast of Graham Land, Antarctica

- Location within Antarctica
- Location: Fallières Coast, Antarctic Peninsula, Antarctica
- Coordinates: 68°43′S 67°10′W
- Ocean/sea sources: Marguerite Bay, Southern Ocean

Mikkelsen Bay (68°43′S 67°10′W) is a bay, 15 nautical miles (28 km; 17 mi) wide at its mouth and indenting 10 nautical miles (19 km; 12 mi), entered between Bertrand Ice Piedmont and Cape Berteaux along the west coast of Graham Land, Antarctica.

== Location ==
Fallières Coast on Antarctic Peninsula.

Mikkelsen Bay is in the east of the larger Marguerite Bay in Graham Land on the Fallières Coast of the Antarctic Peninsula. It is south of Rymill Bay and the Bertrand Ice Piedmont, southwest of the Hadley Upland, west of the Godfrey Upland and north of the Hariot Glacier. Clarke Glacier flows into the southeast corner of the bay. Other features of the coast include Moraine Cove, Pavie Ridge, Dee Ice Piedmont, Doggo Defile, Baudin Peaks and Cape Berteaux. Islands in the bay, or to the west of the bay, include, from east to west, Query Island, Keyhole Island, the Terra Firma Islands, Compass Island and the Flyspot Rocks.

== Exploration and name ==
Mikkelsen Bay was first seen from a distance in 1909 by the French Antarctic Expedition (FrAE) under Jean-Baptiste Charcot, but was not recognized as a large bay. It was first surveyed in 1936 by the British Graham Land Expedition (BGLE) under John Rymill, and resurveyed by the Falkland Islands Dependencies Survey (FIDS) in 1948–49. The name was proposed by members of BGLE for Ejnar Mikkelsen, Danish Arctic explorer and Inspector for East Greenland, 1934–50.

== Features ==
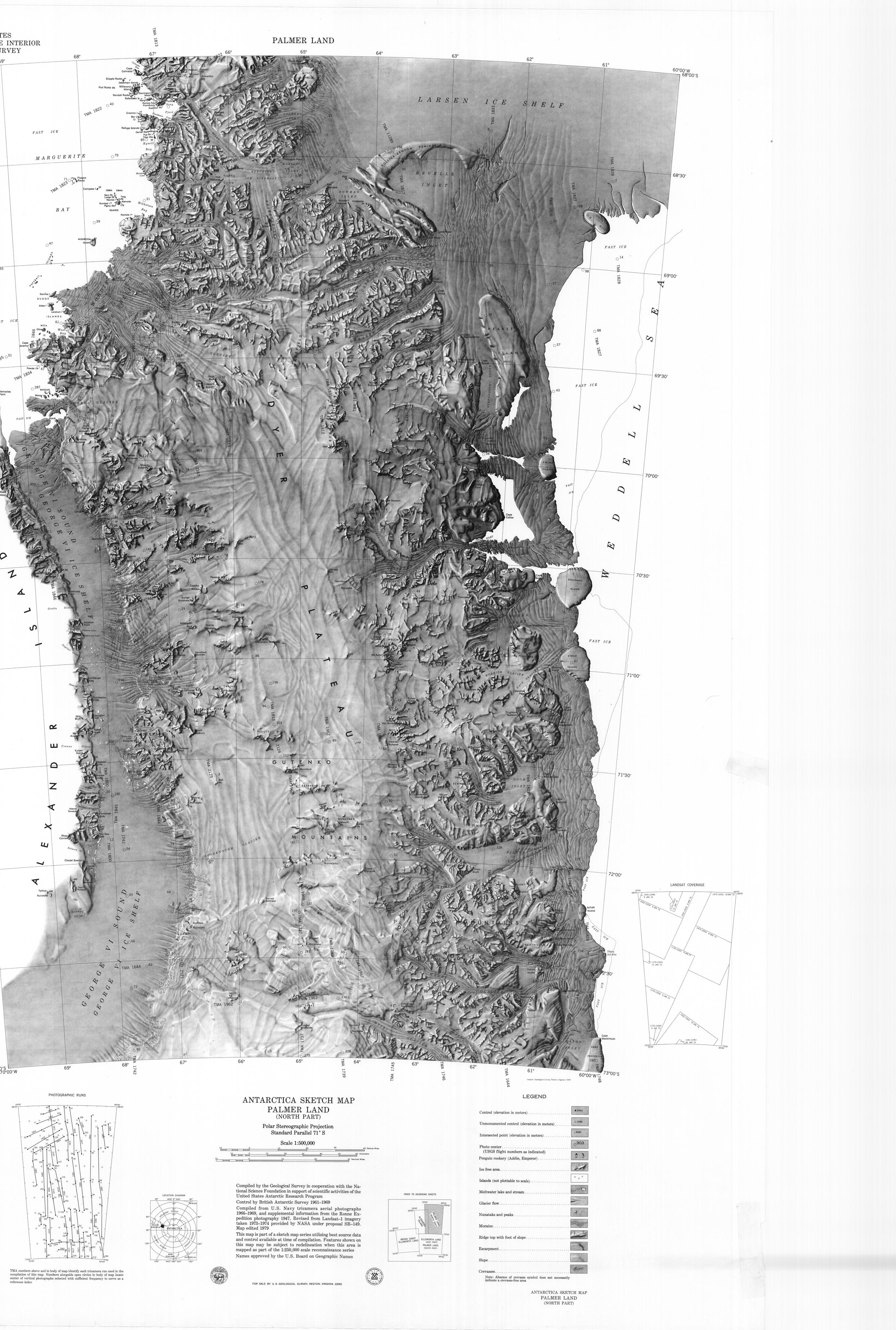
Northern Palmer Land. Mikkelsen Bay in northwest of map.

=== Clarke Glacier ===
68°48′S 66°56′W. A glacier, 2 nautical miles (3.7 km; 2.3 mi) wide and 20 nautical miles (37 km; 23 mi) long, flowing west to Mikkelsen Bay along the north side of Sickle Mountain and Baudin Peaks. First roughly surveyed in 1936 by the BGLE under Rymill. The glacier was traversed near its head by a USAS sledge party in January 1941. Its lower reaches were surveyed in 1948–49 by the FIDS, and the glacier was named by them for Louis C. G. Clarke, Director of the Fitzwilliam Museum, Cambridge, 1937–46, who greatly assisted the BGLE, 1934–37.

=== Moraine Cove ===
68°35′S 67°08′W. A small cove at the north end of Mikkelsen Bay along the west coast of Graham Land. A moraine descends to the cove from the southwest end of Pavie Ridge. The name derives from the provisional name "Moraine Point", used by Professor Robert L. Nichols of the RARE, who examined the geology of this area in 1947. The name Moraine Cove retains the spirit of the naming by Nichols, and is considered more essential for reference purposes than a name for the moraine itself.

=== Pavie Ridge ===
68°34′S 66°59′W. An isolated rocky ridge rising over 500 metres (1,600 ft) high, which extends south and west from Martin Glacier to Moraine Cove, and forms the southeast limit of Bertrand Ice Piedmont. The name "Ile Pavie" was given in 1909 by the FrAE under Charcot to an island, or possible cape, shown on the FrAE maps in 68°27′S 66°40′W. From a position 15 nautical miles (28 km; 17 mi) southeast of Jenny Island, Maurice Bongrain, FrAE surveyor, made sketches of this feature which were labeled "Ile Pavie" and "Cap Pavie". This general area was surveyed in 1936 by the BGLE under Rymill, but the feature named by Charcot was not identified. Following further surveys by the Falkland Islands Dependencies Survey (FIDS) in 1948, Charcot's "Ile Pavie" was identified from Bongrain's sketches as the feature now named Red Rock Ridge. The name Red Rock Ridge is now too firmly established to alter. The name Pavie Ridge has therefore been approved for the isolated rocky ridge described above as forming the south limit of Bertrand Ice Piedmont, and whose position is not far removed from the original position indicated by Charcot. Named by Charcot, presumably for Auguste J. M. Pavie (1848–1925), French diplomat and explorer.

=== Dee Ice Piedmont ===
68°40′S 66°58′W. An ice piedmont between Pavie Ridge and the mouth of Clarke Glacier on the east side of Mikkelsen Bay. Surveyed from the ground by BGLE, 1936–37, and by FIDS, 1948–50. Photographed by the Ronne Antarctic Research Expedition (RARE), November 1947, using trimetrogon air photography. Named by the UK Antarctic Place-Names Committee (UK-APC) after John Dee (1527–1608), English mathematician and pioneer teacher of navigation methods for 30 years during a period of great maritime expansion and exploration.

=== Doggo Defile ===
68°44′S 66°47′W. A narrow, steep-sided defile, in parts less than 1 nautical mile (1.9 km; 1.2 mi) wide, cutting through the coastal mountains east of Dee Ice Piedmont. Photographed from the air by RARE in 1947. Surveyed by FIDS in 1948–50 and 1958. The UK-APC name is descriptive; the northwest entrance is only partly visible to sledge parties traveling along the coast, and the true nature of the feature is completely hidden by the surrounding mountains.

=== Baudin Peaks ===
68°49′S 67°03′W. Group of peaks rising above 750 metres (2,460 ft) high, standing at the southeast corner of Mikkelsen Bay, immediately southwest of the mouth of Clarke Glacier, and 9 nautical miles (17 km; 10 mi) east-northeast of Cape Berteaux. This general area was first sighted and roughly charted in 1909 by the FrAE under Charcot, who gave the name "Cap Pierre Baudin" to a cape in this vicinity. The peaks previously described were roughly surveyed in 1936 by the BGLE under Rymill, but no name was assigned to them. The peaks were resurveyed in 1948–49 by the FIDS, who subsequently identified them as the feature named "Cap Pierre Baudin" by Charcot. Named by Charcot for Pierre Baudin, then port engineer at Pernambuco, now Recife, where the Pourquoi-Pas? put in on her return from the Antarctic.

=== Cape Berteaux ===
68°51′S 67°27′W. Cape surmounted by a high rock peak between Mikkelsen Bay and Wordie Ice Shelf. The FrAE under Charcot, 1908–10, originally applied the name Berteaux to an island in essentially this position. The BGLE under Rymill, 1934–37, identified the feature sighted by Charcot as the cape described above. Named by Charcot for a Monsieur Berteaux who helped obtain funds for his expedition.

== Islands ==
=== Query Island ===
68°48′S 67°12′W. Prominent rocky island lying between the foot of Clarke Glacier and Keyhole Island on the south side of Mikkelsen Bay. Surveyed in 1948 by the FIDS, who so named it because of the difficulty in deciding from a distance whether the feature was an island or part of the mainland.

=== Keyhole Island ===
68°47′S 67°20′W. A small rocky island lying 5 nautical miles (9.3 km; 5.8 mi) southeast of the Terra Firma Islands in the southwest part of Mikkelsen Bay. First surveyed in 1948 by the FIDS, who applied this name because of the presence of an ice arch formed by the icecap on this island.

=== Compass Island ===
68°38′S 67°48′W. A small rocky island 15 metres (49 ft) high, lying in Marguerite Bay 7 nautical miles (13 km; 8.1 mi) northwest of Terra Firma Islands. First seen and photographed from the air on February 1, 1937, by the BGLE. First visited by the FIDS in 1948, and surveyed by them in 1949. So named by FIDS because of difficulties experienced here with compass bearings, eventually proved to be due to substitution of iron for copper wire in an anorak hood.

=== Flyspot Rocks ===
68°35′S 68°19′W. Rocks rising 35 metres (115 ft) high above sea level, lying 14 nautical miles (26 km; 16 mi) northwest of Terra Firma Islands in Marguerite Bay. The rocks are ice covered on the south sides but mainly ice free on their north sides. Probably first sighted in 1909 by the FrAE under Charcot who, from a position slightly northwestward, charted a "doubtful" island in essentially this position. The group was roughly sketched from the air by the BGLE on a flight on February 1, 1937. They were visited and surveyed in 1949 by the FIDS. The name arose at an earlier date because of their indistinct appearance as represented on the BGLE map.

=== Guyer Rock ===
68°33′S 69°01′W. Low rock lying 16 nautical miles (30 km; 18 mi) west of Flyspot Rocks. Named in 1986 by the UK-APC after Captain Simon T. G. Guyer, RM, Officer of the Watch at the time HMS Endurance grounded on the rock in the 1985–86 season.

== Sources ==
- Alberts, Fred G., ed. (1995), Geographic Names of the Antarctic (PDF) (2 ed.), United States Board on Geographic Names This article incorporates public domain material from websites or documents of the United States Board on Geographic Names.
- Palmer Land, USGS: United States Geological Survey

  This article incorporates public domain material from websites or documents of the United States Geological Survey.
