= Neny Island =

Island in Graham Land, Antarctica

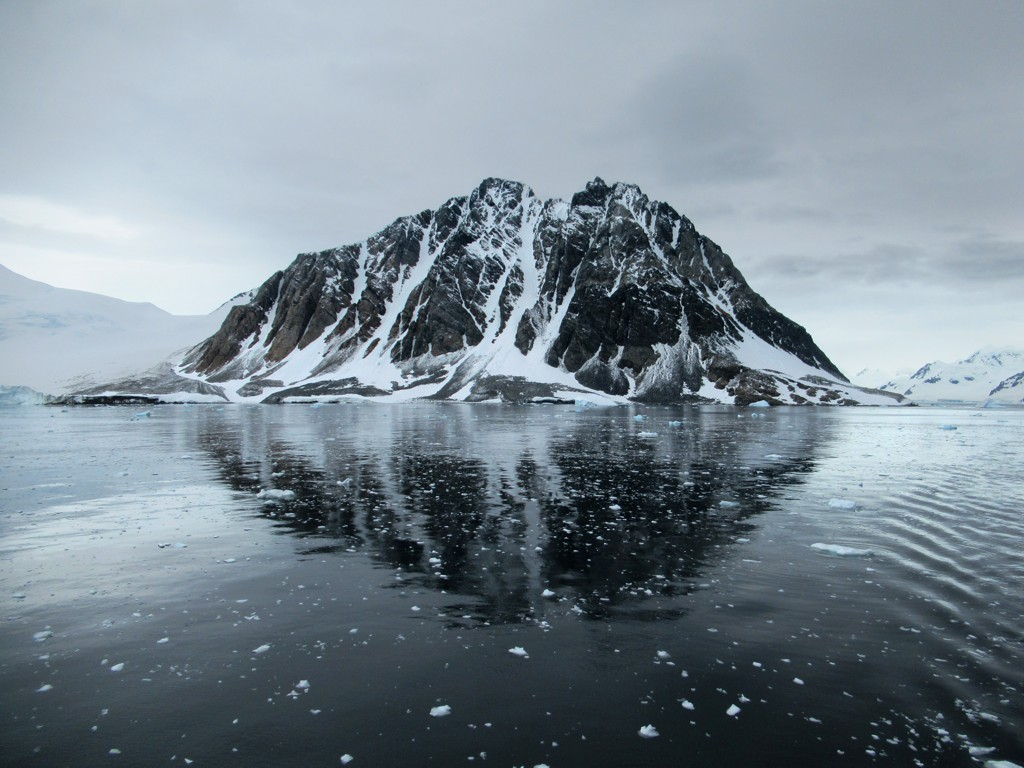

- Location within Antarctica

Geography
- Location: Antarctica
- Coordinates: 68°12′S 67°03′W
- Highest elevation: 675 m (2215 ft)

Administration
- Administered under the Antarctic Treaty System

Demographics
- Population: Uninhabited

Neny Island or (Neny Islands as a variant name) is an island 2.8 km (1.5 nmi) long which rises to 675 m (2,215 ft), lying 1.9 km (1 nmi) northwest of Roman Four Promontory and directly north of the mouth of Neny Fjord, off the west coast of Graham Land in Antarctica. Neny Island was discovered by the British Graham Land Expedition (BGLE) (1934–1937) under John Riddoch Rymill and named after nearby Neny Fjord.

== Named features ==
Several features on Neny Island have been charted and named by various Antarctic expeditions.

Store Point is the island's northernmost point. It was surveyed in 1947 by the Falkland Islands Dependencies Survey (FIDS), who so named it because FIDS maintained an emergency food store on this point.

Norseman Point is the easternmost point. First surveyed in 1936 by the British expedition under Rymill and later named by FIDS after the Norseman airplane which landed near the point to relieve the FIDS party on Stonington Island in February 1950.

== See also ==
- Composite Antarctic Gazetteer
- List of Antarctic and sub-Antarctic islands
- List of Antarctic islands south of 60° S
- SCAR
- Territorial claims in Antarctica
