= Trail Inlet =

Body of water in Graham Land, Antarctica

Trail Inlet (68°5′S 65°20′W) is an ice-filled inlet which recedes southwest 15 nautical miles (28 km) between Three Slice Nunatak and Cape Freeman, on the east coast of Graham Land. The inlet was sighted by Sir Hubert Wilkins on his flight of December 20, 1928. The width of Graham Land is reduced to 20 nautical miles (37 km) between the heads of Trail Inlet and Neny Fjord. So named by the US-SCAN because it was a natural route of travel for flights and sledge trips from the East Base of the United States Antarctic Service (USAS), 1939–1941, to the east coast of Graham Land.
