= Thomas J. Allan =

British radio engineer

Thomas J. Allan (1940–1966) was a British radio engineer who died in Antarctica.

Allan was a radio engineer for the British Antarctic Survey at Stonington Island in 1965–1966. He died in May 1966, in a sledging accident, along with John Fraser Noel, near what was subsequently named Tragic Corner off Marguerite Island.

Mount Allan in Antarctica, one of the Traverse Mountains, is named in his memory.
