= Skinner Glacier (Antarctica) =

Glacier in Antarctica

Skinner Glacier (70°14′S 68°0′W) is a glacier on the west edge of Palmer Land, flowing south-southwest between Mount Dixey and Mount Flower to enter George VI Sound just east of Carse Point. Named by United Kingdom Antarctic Place-Names Committee (UK-APC) after Alexander C. Skinner, British Antarctic Survey (BAS) geologist at Fossil Bluff and Stonington Island stations, 1968–70.
