= Mount Noel (Antarctica) =

Mountain in Palmer Land, Antarctica

Coordinates: 69.917°S 67.917°W

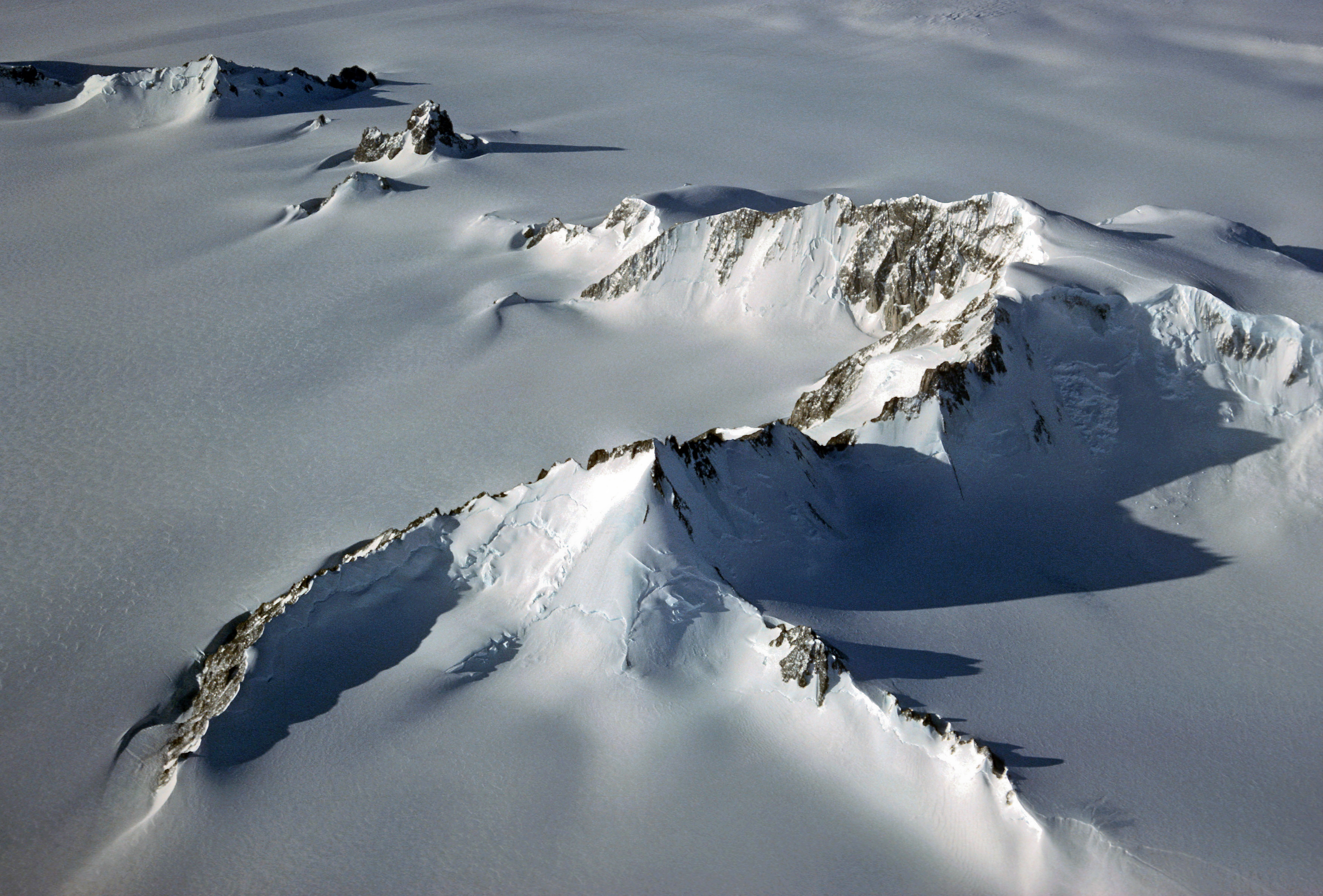
Mount Noelin the Traverse Mountains in 2011

Mount Noel is a mountain in the Traverse Mountains of Antarctica. It is 1,600 metres (5,200 ft) high. It is south of McHugo Peak and north of Mount Allan. It was named for John Fraser Noel (1942–1966) who died in a sledging accident near Tragic Corner while employed by the British Antarctic Survey.
