= Calmette =

Calmette is a surname. Notable people with the surname include:

- Antoine de Bosc de la Calmette (1752–1803), Danish governor and landscape architect
- Albert Calmette ForMemRS (1863–1933), French physician, bacteriologist, immunologist, officer of the Pasteur Institute
- Gaston Calmette (1858–1914), French journalist
- Jean Calmette (1692–1740), French Jesuit missionary in South India, Indologist

== See also ==
- Bacillus Calmette-Guérin (BCG), vaccine against tuberculosis
- Calmette Hospital (l'hôpital Calmette), public hospital on Monivong Boulevard in Phnom Penh
- Calmette Bay, small bay between Camp Point and Cape Calmette, on the west coast of Graham Land
- Cape Calmette, western extremity of a rocky peninsula projecting from the west coast of Graham Land
- La Calmette, commune in the Gard department in southern France
- Grand Noir de la Calmette, red wine hybrid grape, a cross between Aramon and Petit Bouschet
- Calum Bett
- Calumet (disambiguation)
- Calumetite
