= Mount Allan (Antarctica) =

Mountain in Antarctica

Mount Allan (69°59′S 67°45′W) is the largest massif (1,600 m) in the Traverse Mountains, isolated to the north and south by low passes, on the Rymill Coast, Palmer Land. Named in 1977 by the United Kingdom Antarctic Place-Names Committee (UK-APC) after Thomas J. Allan (1940–66), British Antarctic Survey (BAS) radio operator at Stonington Island, 1965–66, who lost his life while sledging with J.F. Noel near Tragic Corner, Fallieres Coast, in May 1966.
