= Warren Ice Piedmont =

Warren Ice Piedmont (70°0′S 68°15′W) is an ice piedmont on the Rymill Coast of Palmer Land, lying westward of Traverse Mountains and bounded north and south by Terminus Nunatak and Riley Glacier, the latter once considered to include this ice piedmont. The feature was photographed from the air by the U.S. Navy, 1966, and surveyed by British Antarctic Survey (BAS), 1970–73. Named by the United Kingdom Antarctic Place-Names Committee (UK-APC) in 1978 after Douglas E. Warren, Director of Overseas Surveys, 1968–80, with overall responsibility for British mapping in the Antarctic.
