= John Fraser Noel =

British engineer in Antarctica (1942–1966)

John Fraser Noel (1942–1966) was an engineer from Cardiff, Wales, who died in Antarctica in 1966.

Noel was a diesel mechanic for the British Antarctic Survey at Stonington Island in 1965–1966. He died in May 1966, in a sledging accident, trying to save his fellow adventurer Thomas J. Allan, near what was subsequently named Tragic Corner off Marguerite Island.

Mount Noel in Antarctica, one of the Traverse Mountains, is named in his memory.

Noel had been a member of a scout group in Llanishen, Cardiff, and there is now a scout hall named after him: Fraser Hall was built for 1st Llanishen scouts.
