= Skinner Glacier =

Skinner Glacier may refer to:

- Skinner Glacier (Antarctica)
- Skinner Glacier (Oregon), in Cascade Range, Oregon, United States
