= Breton Island =

Breton Island may refer to:

- Breton Island (Antarctica)
- Breton Island (Louisiana) in the Gulf of Mexico
- Cape Breton Island in Nova Scotia, Canada
- The Breton Islands near Quadra Island, British Columbia, Canada
