= Tragic Corner =

Bluff in Antarctica

- Bluff
- Interactive map of Tragic Corner
- Coordinates: 68°00′S 66°48′W
- Location: Fallières Coast, Graham Land, Antarctica
- Part of: Boulding Ridge
- Offshore water bodies: Between Todd Glacier and McClary Glacier
- Elevation: 750 m (2,460 ft)
- naming authority: United Kingdom Antarctic Place-Names Committee (UK-APC)
- named for: Fatal sledging accident involving Thomas J. Allan and John Fraser Noel

Tragic Corner is a bluff rising to about 750 m and marking the northeast end of Boulding Ridge, located between Todd Glacier and McClary Glacier on Fallières Coast. Named by United Kingdom Antarctic Place-Names Committee (UK-APC) because Thomas J. Allan and John Fraser Noel died in the vicinity on a sledge journey from Stonington Island in May 1966.
