= Mast Hill =

Mast Hill (68°11′05.5″S 67°00′06.9″W) is a hill 14 metres (46 ft) high about 100 meters from the western end of Stonington Island, Marguerite Bay, on the west side of the Antarctic Peninsula. It was surveyed by the East Base party of the U.S. Antarctic Service, 1939–41, which erected a flag staff (or "mast") on this hill and built its base close northeastward.

It is 80 meters northeast of Flagpole Point.
