= Flagpole Point =

Flagpole Point (68°11′S 67°1′W) is a point 0.2 nautical miles (0.4 km) northwest of Fishtrap Cove, forming the southern part of the western extremity of Stonington Island, close off the west coast of Graham Land, Antarctica. It was first surveyed by the United States Antarctic Service (USAS), 1939–41, whose East Base was located on this island. It was resurveyed in 1946–47 by the Falkland Islands Dependencies Survey, and so named by them because of the flagpole which was erected by the USAS on a rocky knoll close northeast of this point.
