= Gustavo Giró Tapper =

Argentine military explorer

Gustavo Alfonso Giró Tapper
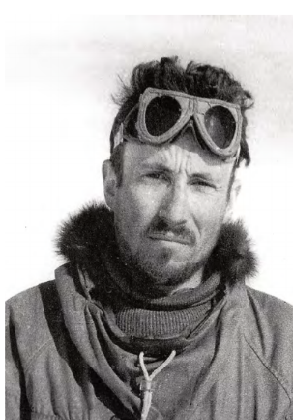
- Born: Córdoba
- Education: Colegio Militar de la Nación

Gustavo Adolfo Giró Tapper (Córdoba March 22, 1931 - January 11, 2004 Ushuaia) was an Argentine military explorer who participated in the foundation of the first Antarctic bases.

== Training ==
Gustavo Giró Tapper completed his primary and secondary studies in his hometown. Carried by his vocation, he entered the Military College of the Nation, from where he graduated as an Infantry Second Lieutenant in December 1953. Later he completed his knowledge and training by taking courses in skydiving, meteorology, gravimetry, skiing and winter survival. He was chief of three Antarctic bases and accumulated 18,000 kilometers of Antarctic patrols. His activities include the exploration patrols that he carried out from the San Martín Base in 1958/9 and the Winter Terrestrial Expedition that he commanded in 1962 between the Esperanza and San Martín bases. His performance in these operations earned him in 1965 his designation as second Chief of Operation 90, the First Argentine Land Expedition to the South Pole. On November 30, 1971, he retired with the rank of Major and settled in Ushuaia, where he became one of the greatest promoters of Antarctic and Fuegian tourism. There he formed a commercial company that took international tourist contingents to Antarctica, whom I accompany annually until 1990.

== Career path ==
=== Exploration from the San Martín Base ===
In 1958, during the International Geophysical Year, Lieutenant Giró Tapper served as the commander of San Martín Base. The help of his team of 20 persons was indispensable for the Argentine Antarctic research efforts. During the overwintering period he conducted two important patrols with dog sleds. The first patrol took him 200 km to the south where he established a refuge called Nogal de Saldan (Saldon walnut). The second patrol crossed the Antarctic peninsula from Margarita Bay to the Weddell Sea. In 1959, the glacial conditions hindered the crew change and resupply of San Martín Base, leaving Tapper in charge of the station for one more year. This time he had a crew of six people and the base was in a state of emergency. Nevertheless, Tapper succeeded in leading two important patrols: a 600 km crossing on the frozen sea to the Henkes islands and the longest Argentine dog sled hike that reached to 72 o South, a return trip of no less than 800 km.

=== Esperanza - Antarctic Winter Antarctic Expedition ===
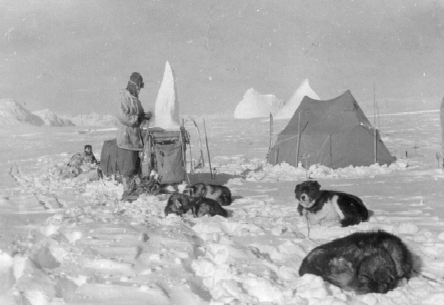
Esperanza Winter Antarctic Expedition

In 1962, the then First Lieutenant Giró Tapper returned to Antarctica as the head of Esperanza Base. From Esperanza he conducted several land surveys which culminated with a patrol from the joint Army and Navy base “Teniente Matienzo” to the Antarctic Polar circle, all in all a trajectory of 457 km. Later, during the coldest months with the least daylight, Tapper led the First Antarctic Overland Winter Expedition. The main mission of the Expedition was to connect Esperanza with San Martín base (in disuse since February 28, 1960). Its secondary mission was to acquire experience in severe winter, complete a scientific and technical program, prepare the personnel for an expedition to the South Pole and to test different equipment and techniques in extreme climatic conditions and complicated terrain. For this end, Tapper chose a route that crossed a mountainous area with glaciers, across the Antarctandes and along the Larsen Ice Shelf. The traverse covered more than 1800 km in track vehicles and 1500 km with eight-dogsleds. The trip lasted from June 14 to October 25, that is, more than four polar winter months. Giró Tapper wrote about the trip: “... the cold surface of the sea, no more than 20 cm thick, covered the ocean waters…” Winds blowing at 220 km/h...”, “temperature at 43 o degrees below zero… hours in darkness and complete silence… in complete abandon...; between deep cracks and deadly open mouths hiding under the thin bridges of snow.”

=== Belgrano Base ===
In 1965, Captain Giró Tapper assumed the position as the head of Belgrano Base. Belgrano was the designated starting point for the “Operation 90”, the overland expedition to the South Pole that was supposed to take place in 1966/67, after acquiring the necessary knowledge, equipment and supplies. Tapper’s mission was to establish a secondary operational base to the south from the Filchner ice shelf and equip it with 50 tons of supplies. The base was meant to be manned with six persons carrying out scientific observations during the 1966 polar night. To this end, Tapper was in command of nine tracked vehicles, two packs of dogs and one plane with skates. Between January 19 and April 2, the vehicles made five trips, covering 4000 km in total. Traversing areas with dangerous crevasses, Tapper and his crew transported 110 tons of supplies to the location designated for the new base. The airplane flew 9000 km and the fourteen expeditioners, headed by Giró Tapper, transported nine tons of cargo for constructing the Advanced Science Base “Alférez de Navío Sobral” (Navy Ensign Sobral) at 420 km from Belgrano Base. The station was occupied by its first crew of four men. Thus, in barely three months GiróTapper and his crew managed to complete the tasks designated for two years. This meant that the long-awaited approach to the South Pole could start ahead of time.

=== Operation 90 ===
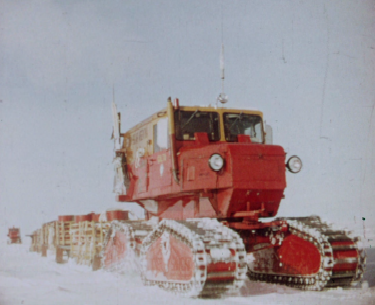
Sno-Cat used in Operation 90

On October 2, 1965, the Chief of the Expedition, the then Colonel Jorge Edgard Leal, arrived with an airplane. Captain Giró Tapper became the second chief and the Scientific Director of the “Operation 90”. The march towards the South Pole started on October 26. Giró drove a snow-cat “Cordoba”. But in addition to his leadership obligations, he was also tasked with meteorological observations in a mobile station at three hour intervals throughout the journey, glaciological measurements of accumulation lines at every 10 km and gravimetric measurements at every 20 km. In addition, he had to film the activities of the expedition with a video camera, resulting in a colour documentary called “Operation 90”. The three snow-cats reached the South Geographic Pole on December 10, 1965, with the temperature at minus 30 degrees below zero. They raised the Argentine flag on an improvised flag pole made of an antenna mast. Today, this mast constitutes Historic Site and Monument No 1 of the Antarctic Treaty. The arrival at the South Pole was a success partly owing to prior exploratory experience, but so was the return: in barely 21 days, on December 31, the expeditioners returned to their starting point, having covered 2892 km in 66 days.

=== Later projects ===
Giró Tapper’s drive and ingenuity did not end at the South Pole. Before being relieved from his duties at Belgrano Base, he and another official organised a parachute jump 30 km from the base on January 12, 1966. They jumped together with three dogs, a collapsible sled, foodstuff and survival equipment − essentially a flying dog sled patrol which could be used for search and rescue missions. In just a few days before the jump, he had presented a project to conduct a Transpolar Scientific Expedition in 1969/70. This expedition would have connected the furthest extremes of the Antarctic continent via the Pole of Inaccessibility, thus crossing the least known areas of the continent. Had this project been approved, it would have been the toughest Antarctic expedition of all times.
