= Barbara Island =

Barbara Island may refer to

- Barbara Island (Antarctica), part of the Debenham Islands in Antarctica
- Barbara Island (Aleutian Islands), part of the Andreanof Islands in the Aleutian Islands
- Barbara Island (Ontario) in Ontario, Canada
