= Anemometer Hill =

Anemometer Hill (68°11′S 67°0′W) is a hill 25 metres (80 ft) high northeast of Fishtrap Cove on Stonington Island, in Marguerite Bay, Antarctica. It was surveyed by the East Base party of the U.S. Antarctic Service, 1939–41, which built its base on this island, and so named by the United Kingdom Antarctic Place-Names Committee because the hill was the site of an anemometer in 1961.
