= Boulding Ridge =

- Location within Antarctica

Highest point
- Coordinates: 68°2′S 66°55′W

Geography
- Location: Graham Land

Boulding Ridge is the ridge separating Todd Glacier and McClary Glacier on the west side of Graham Land. It was named by the UK Antarctic Place-Names Committee for Richard A. Boulding, British Antarctic Survey surveyor at Stonington Island, 1965–68.
