= Eureka Glacier =

Glacier in Antarctica

Eureka Glacier (69°44′S 68°45′W) is a broad, gently sloping glacier, 18 nautical miles (33 km) long and 17 nautical miles (31 km) wide at its mouth, which flows westward from the west side of Palmer Land into George VI Sound. It is bounded on its north side by the nunataks south of Mount Edgell, on its south side by the Traverse Mountains and Terminus Nunatak, and at its head Prospect Glacier provides a route to the Wordie Ice Shelf. It was first surveyed in 1936 by the British Graham Land Expedition (BGLE) under John Rymill and resurveyed in 1948 by the Falkland Islands Dependencies Survey. The name, from the ancient Greek word eureka, expresses the triumph of discovery and arose because the BGLE sledge party found their way to George VI Sound via this glacier in 1936.
