= Haulaway Point =

Haulaway Point (68°11′S 67°0′W) is a small rocky point midway along the northeast side of Stonington Island, close off the west coast of Graham Land, Antarctica. It was first surveyed by the United States Antarctic Service, 1939–41. It was resurveyed in 1946–47 by the Falkland Islands Dependencies Survey, who so named the point because it is one of the best places for hauling stores ashore.
