= Mount Eissinger =

Mountain in Antarctica

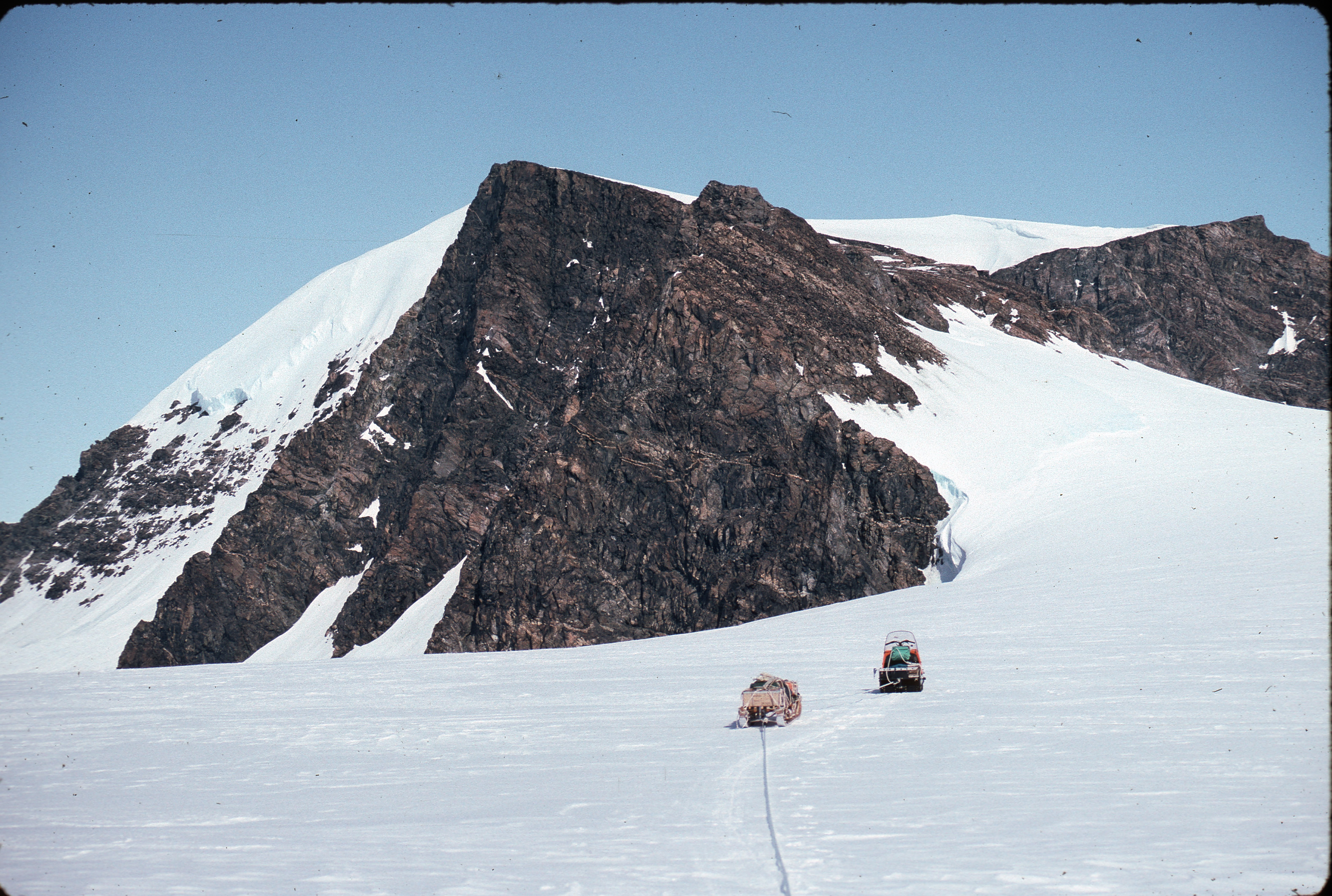
Mount Eissinger

Mount Eissinger (70°2′S 67°44′W) is a large ridge-like mountain at the north side of Riley Glacier on the west side of Palmer Land. The feature has a snow-topped upper surface, bare rock cliffs along the north side, and an impressive rectangular rock buttress rising in an unbroken, near-vertical sweep from the glacier to 500 metres (1,600 ft) at the west end. It was mapped by the United States Geological Survey (USGS) in 1974, and was named by the Advisory Committee on Antarctic Names for Karlheinz Eissinger, a USGS topographic engineer with the Ellsworth Land Survey party, 1968–69.
