= Mount Eubanks =

Mountain in Palmer Land, Antarctica

Mount Eubanks (70°2′S 67°15′W) is an isolated mountain that rises 600 metres (2,000 ft) above the ice surface and provides a prominent landmark near the head of Riley Glacier in Palmer Land. It was named by the Advisory Committee on Antarctic Names for Lieutenant Commander Paul D. Eubanks, U.S. Navy, Commander of LC-130 aircraft on long-range flights between McMurdo Station and the Lassiter Coast, 1969–70. He also carried out open field and resupply missions to various stations and camps elsewhere in Antarctica.
