= Gull Channel =

Channel in Graham Land, Antarctica

Coordinates: 68°11′12″S 66°59′14″W

Gull Channel is a channel 0.1 nautical miles (0.2 km) wide between Dynamite Island and Stonington Island, along the west coast of Graham Land, Antarctica. It was first surveyed by the United States Antarctic Service, 1939–41, and so named by them because numerous sea gulls frequented the channel area.
