= McClary Glacier =

Glacier in Antarctica

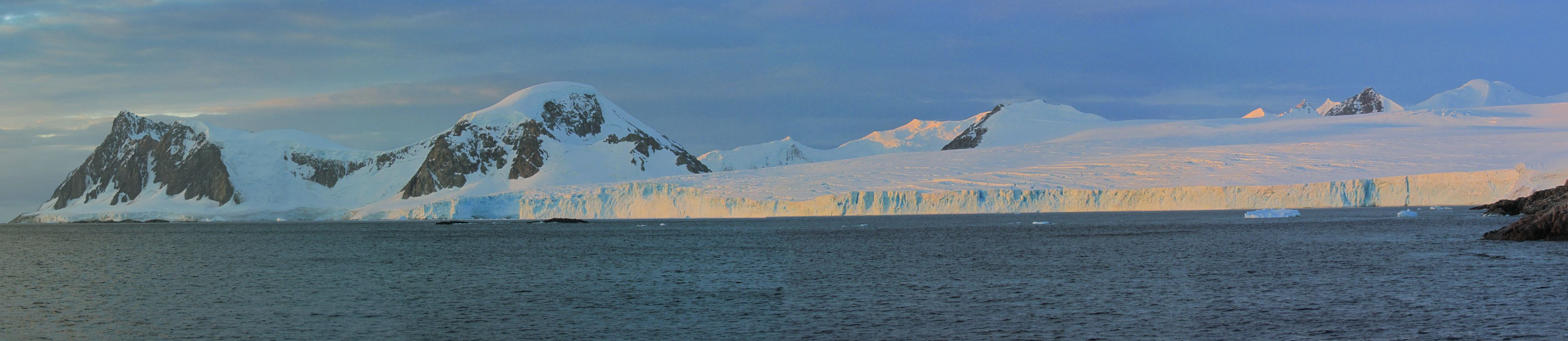
McClary Glacier as seen from San Martín Base

McClary Glacier (68°4′S 67°0′W) is a glacier 10 nautical miles (19 km) long and 2 nautical miles (4 km) wide on the west coast of Graham Land, Antarctica. It flows southwest along the north side of Butson Ridge into Marguerite Bay between Cape Calmette and the Debenham Islands. The glacier was first roughly surveyed by the British Graham Land Expedition, 1936–37, and resurveyed by the Falkland Islands Dependencies Survey, 1946–50. It was named by the UK Antarctic Place-Names Committee for George B. McClary, father of Nelson McClary, mate on the Port of Beaumont during the Ronne Antarctic Research Expedition, 1947–48.
