= Millerand Island =

Island in Graham Land, Antarctica

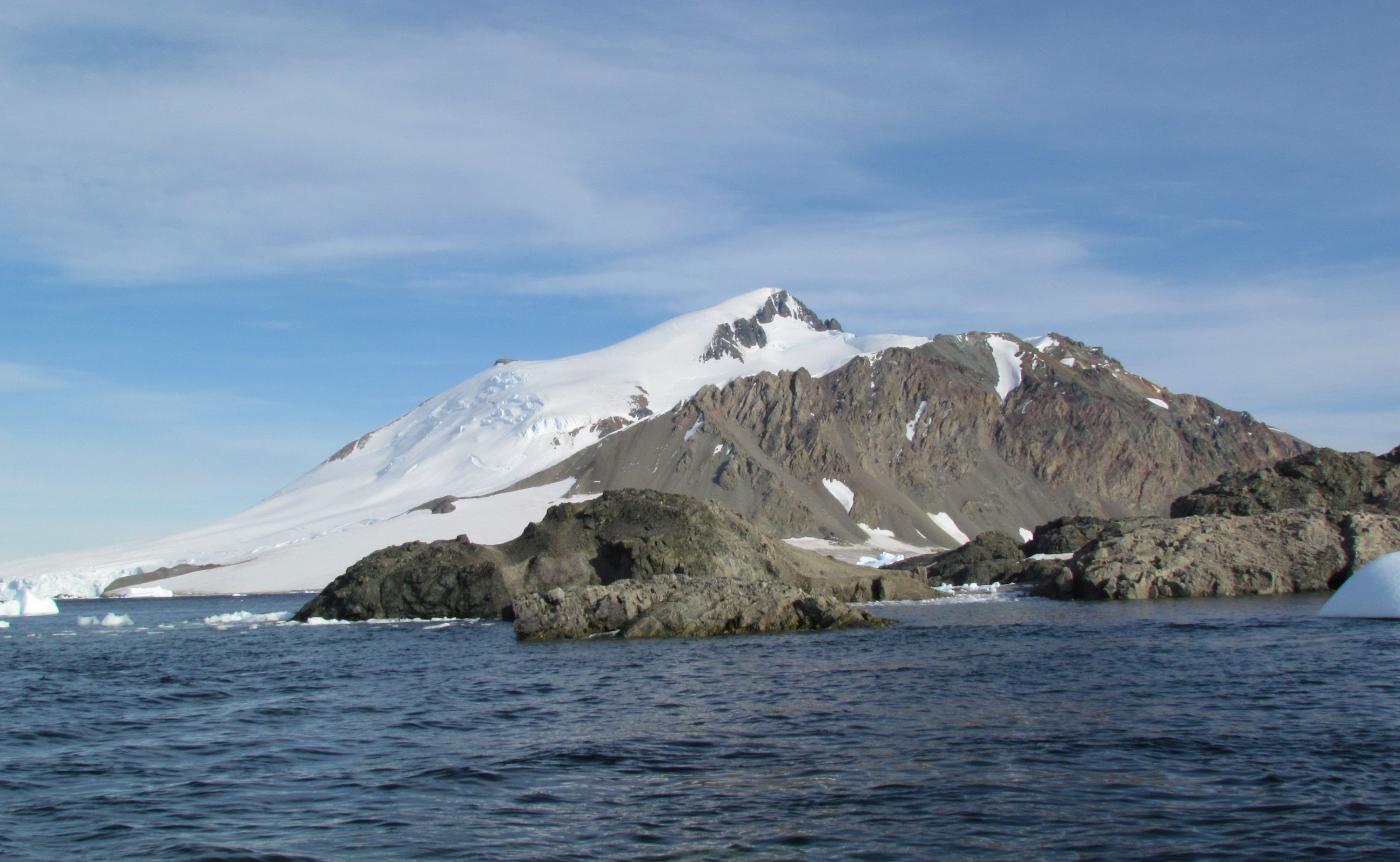
- Millerand Island from San Martín Base, 2011

- Location within Antarctic Peninsula

Geography
- Location: Antarctica
- Coordinates: 68°09′S 67°13′W
- Length: 6 km (3.7 mi)
- Width: 6 km (3.7 mi)

Administration
- Administered under the Antarctic Treaty System

Demographics
- Population: Uninhabited

Millerand Island is a high rugged island 6 km (3 nmi) in diameter, lying 7 km (4 nmi) south of Cape Calmette, off the west coast of Graham Land. It was discovered by the French Antarctic Expedition (1908–1910) under Jean-Baptiste Charcot, who thought that it was a cape of the mainland and named it as such after Alexandre Millerand, French statesman.

== 17 de Agosto Refuge ==
Refuge 17 de Agosto 68°07′53″S 67°10′16″W is an Antarctic refuge located in the north east of the Millerand Island in the Marguerite Bay, on the Fallières Coast. It is operated by the Argentine Army and was inaugurated on 17 August 1957. It depends on the San Martín base, which is five kilometres away on the Barry Island. The refuge consists of a red hut, used by the personnel employed in the missions carried out in the area, and has a capacity to accommodate four people, enough food for two weeks, fuel, gas and first aid kit.

== Geology ==
The island was mapped geologically in 1958 and 1959 by Keith Hoskins, a British geologist based on nearby Stonington Island.

== See also ==
- List of Antarctic research stations
- List of Antarctic field camps
- List of Antarctic and sub-Antarctic islands
- List of Antarctic islands south of 60° S
- Powell Channel
- SCAR
- Territorial claims in Antarctica
- Composite Antarctic Gazetteer
