= Dynamite Island =

Island in Graham Land, Antarctic Peninsula

- Location within Antarctica

Geography
- Location: Antarctica
- Coordinates: 68°11′12″S 66°59′06″W

Administration
- Administered under the Antarctic Treaty System

Demographics
- Population: Uninhabited

Dynamite Island is a small, low, rocky island in Back Bay, lying 130 metres (142 yd) east of Stonington Island, off the Fallières Coast on the west side of Graham Land. It was first surveyed by the United States Antarctic Service, 1939–41, who referred to it as "Petrel Island", a name not approved because it duplicates an existing name in the Antarctic. The name Dynamite Island was proposed by Finn Ronne, leader of the Ronne Antarctic Research Expedition, 1947–48; in 1947 it was necessary to dynamite a passage for the Port of Beaumont, Texas through the ice to the east of this island.

The tiny island is 125 metres (137 yd) long from northwest to southeast, and up to 70 metres (77 yd) wide, and about 0.7 hectares (1.7 acres) in area.

== See also ==
- Gull Channel
- List of Antarctic and sub-Antarctic islands
