= San Martín Base =

San Martín Base Base San Martín
- Antarctic base
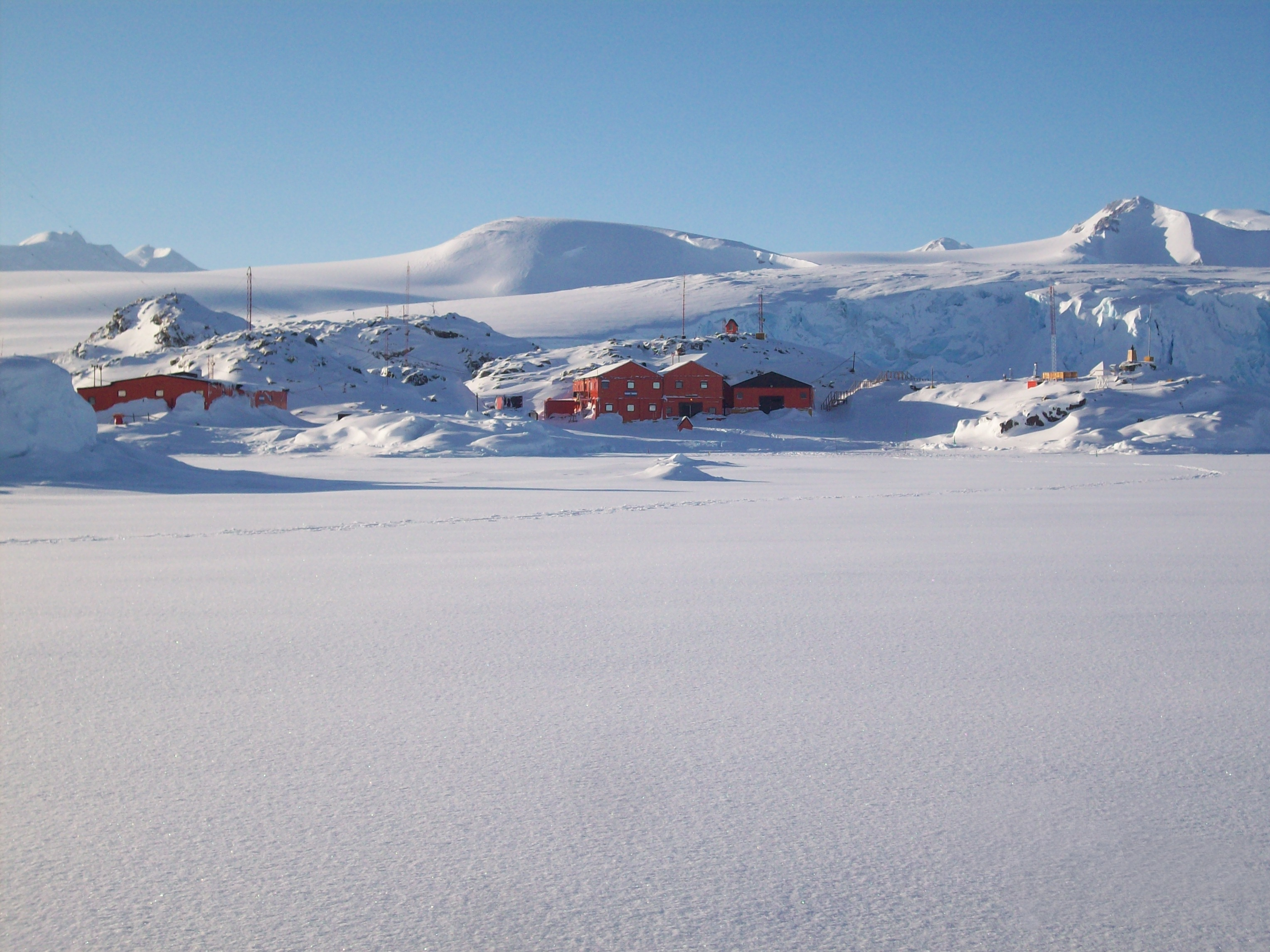
- San Martín in 2008 austral winter
- Motto: Spanish: Hombres de voluntad, luchan y vencen desde 1951 ("Willing men, fight and win since 1951")
- Location within Antarctica
- Coordinates: 68°07′48″S 67°06′05″W
- Country: Argentina
- Province: Tierra del Fuego, Antarctica, and South Atlantic Islands Province
- Department: Antártida Argentina
- Region: Marguerite Bay; Antarctic Peninsula; Antarctica
- Location: Barry Island
- Established: 21 March 1951
- Named for: José de San Martín

Government
  - Type: Directorate
  - Body: Dirección Nacional del Antártico
  - Operator: Instituto Antártico Argentino

Area
  - Total: 18 ha (44 acres)
- Elevation: 5 m (16 ft)

Population (2017)
  - Summer: 19
  - Winter: 21
- Time zone: UTC-3 (ART)
- UN/LOCODE: AQ SMT
- Type: All year-round
- Period: Annual
- Status: Operational
- Activities: List: Geomagnetism; Phytoplankton biology; Geodesy; Glaciology
- Facilities: List: Main house; Airstrip; Heliport; Infirmary; Chapel; Radio station; Main and auxiliary power plants; Vehicle fleet; Vehicle garage; Laboratory; Workshop (mechanical, carpentry); Deposits

San Martín Base (Spanish: Base San Martín) is a permanent, all year-round Argentine Antarctic base and scientific research station named after General José de San Martín, the Libertador of Argentina, Chile and Peru. It is located on Barry Island, Marguerite Bay, Antarctic Peninsula.

At the time of its foundation in 1951, it was the first human settlement south of the Antarctic Circle. (Note: The Antarctic Circle is the parallel of latitude that runs 66°33′51.1″ (or 66.5642°) south of the Equator) As of 2014 it is Argentina's westernmost permanent base.

As of 2014 San Martín is one of 13 research bases in Antarctica operated by Argentina.

== History ==
The increased Antarctic activity that Argentina developed since 1940, along with the longstanding national interest to exercise effective sovereignty over one of the most remote areas of Antarctica created the need for a scientific station located south of the Antarctic Circle.

In order to transport the personnel and materials to Marguerite Bay, where the new settlement was to be built, the Argentine Navy hired the Santa Micaela. Commanded by Overseas Captain Santiago Farrell, it was a cargo ship belonging to the Argentine shipping company Pérez Companc S. A. The Santa Micaela left the port of Buenos Aires on 12 February 1951, and on 8 March it anchored at Marguerite Bay. The last part of the trip it was escorted by the Argentine Navy tug ARA Sanavirón.

Over twelve working days the crew built the two-story main house with double wooden walls, a main deposit, an emergency house, five metal warehouses for supplies, housing for the dog packs, a power generator and the four towers for the 25 metres (82 feet) high rhombic antenna.

San Martín was inaugurated on 21 March 1951, in the presence of the Santa Micaela and ARA Sanavirón crews and the base personnel led by then Colonel Hernán Pujato.

Since then, the meteorological station within the base provides detailed weather records and develops forecasts indispensable for the navigation of the sea waters adjacent to the Antarctic Peninsula.

In March 1952 the ARA Bahía Aguirre anchored at Marguerite Bay bringing a relief crew through a Sikorsky S-51 helicopter transfer, the first of its kind performed by the Argentine Armed Forces in Antarctica.

On 30 June 1952 a fire, exacerbated by the ongoing blizzard, devoured the main house and two food stores, the power plant and the radio station. With rationed food and fuel, activities continued normally, carrying on with the explorations schedule as originally planned. During the 1952–53 season, thick ice blocked the way of relief ships, which aggravated the situation for the twenty base inhabitants. On 26 March 1953 the Argentine Air Force Avro Lincoln nicknamed Cruz del Sur airdropped food and other priceless items.

Personnel at San Martín Base conducted several exploration expeditions to the northern and southern boundaries of the bay. They also crossed the Antarctic Peninsula mountain range, reaching the Mobiloil Inlet on the Weddell Sea.

In 1960 the base was closed; it was reactivated as permanent on 21 March 1976.

On 14 June 1962 an expedition led by then First Lieutenant Gustavo Adolfo Giró Tapper left Esperanza looking for a passage that would link the village with San Martín. Using snowcats and sleigh dogs they explored Duse Bay, Prince Gustav Channel, Cape Longing, Foca Nunataks, Ameghino Peninsula, Jason Island, Cape Robinson and Carreta Bay, where they had to leave the snow cats and continue with sleds to cross the cordillera. After reaching San Martín, they traveled back to Esperanza, where they arrived on 25 August. During the trip the party overcame numerous obstacles and withstood temperatures below −43 °C (−45 °F) and katabatic winds of 220 km/h (140 mph). This feat is considered even now as the most important ever made in the area.

=== Historic site ===
Some unused installations of the base, a cross, a flagpole and a monolith erected in 1951, have been designated as Historic Site or Monument, following a proposal by Argentina to the Antarctic Treaty Consultative Meeting.

== Description ==
Marguerite Bay opens on the west coast of the Antarctic Peninsula. Wide and deep, the bay is closed between Belgrano and Alexander I islands, and the Fallieres Coast, making its access very difficult for most of the year due to the thick ice-covered waters.

In this zone, rarely visited because of the difficulties and hazards for navigation, there are several groups of islands, islets, rocks and reefs that draw a network of channels and fjords, usually frozen. Some of the most important islands are the Pourquoi Pas, Herradura, Caballete and Millerand, all of them next to the Debenham archipelago, where San Martín was built.

As of 2014 San Martín is composed of 14 buildings spanning a total area of 18 ha (180,000 m^{2}; 1,900,000 sq ft). The base has several dependencies and facilities, namely: main house; airstrip; heliport; infirmary; chapel; main and auxiliary power plants; vehicle fleet (a number of ski-doos, and a few snow tracks and ATVs) and park, laboratory, mechanical and carpentry workshops, and several deposits. The all-year capable airstrip is located on nearby Uspallata Glacier; during winter the deeply frozen sea is also used to land light aircraft. The 20 m^{2} (220 sq ft) infirmary and basic operating suite is attended by a doctor and a nurse; it has one bed, x-ray and odontological facilities.

San Martín is responsible for the maintenance of several Argentine-built refuges in the area: 17 de Agosto, El Plumerillo, Paso de los Andes, Chacabuco, Yapeyú, Maipo and Nogal de Saldán.

San Martín Base in March 2011

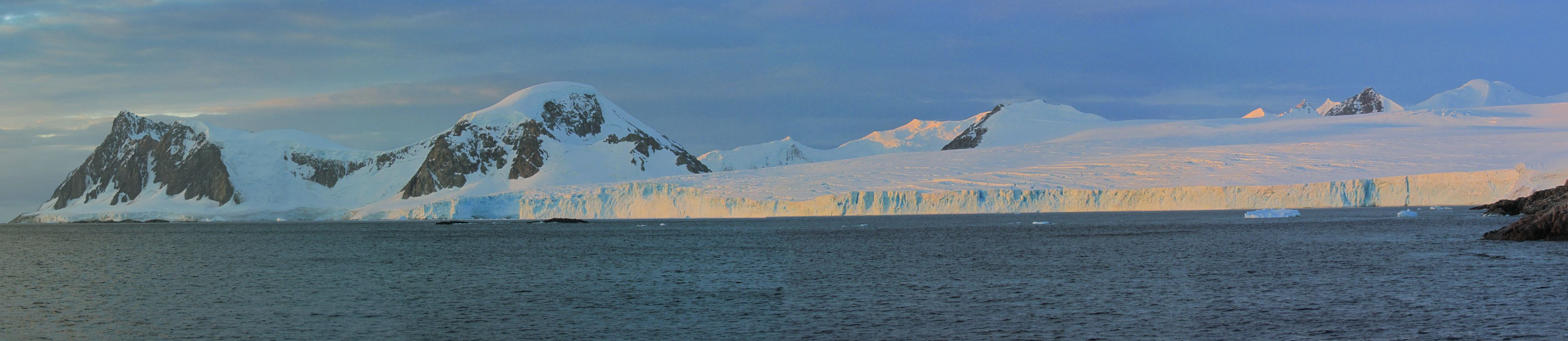
McClary Glacier

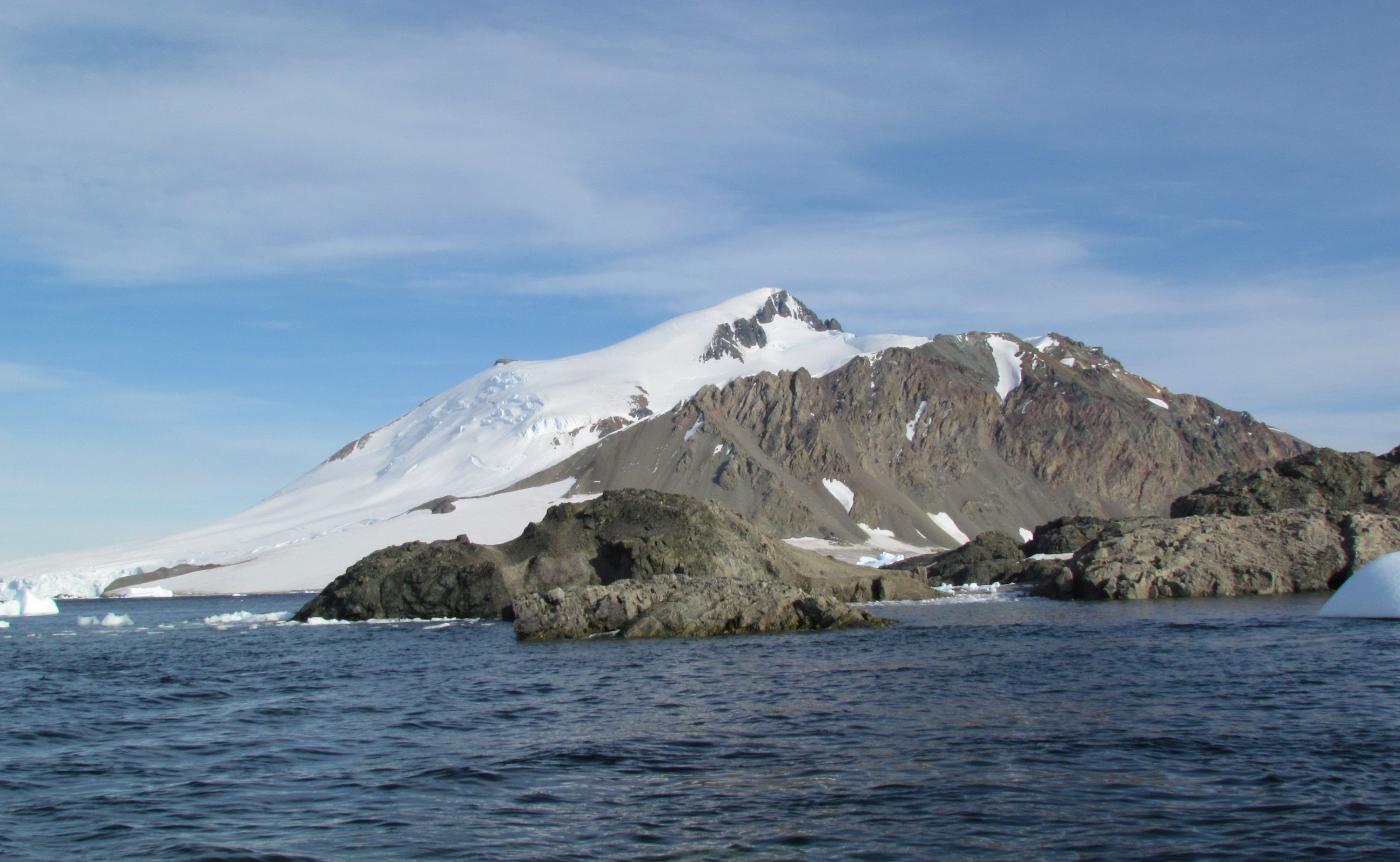
Millerand Island

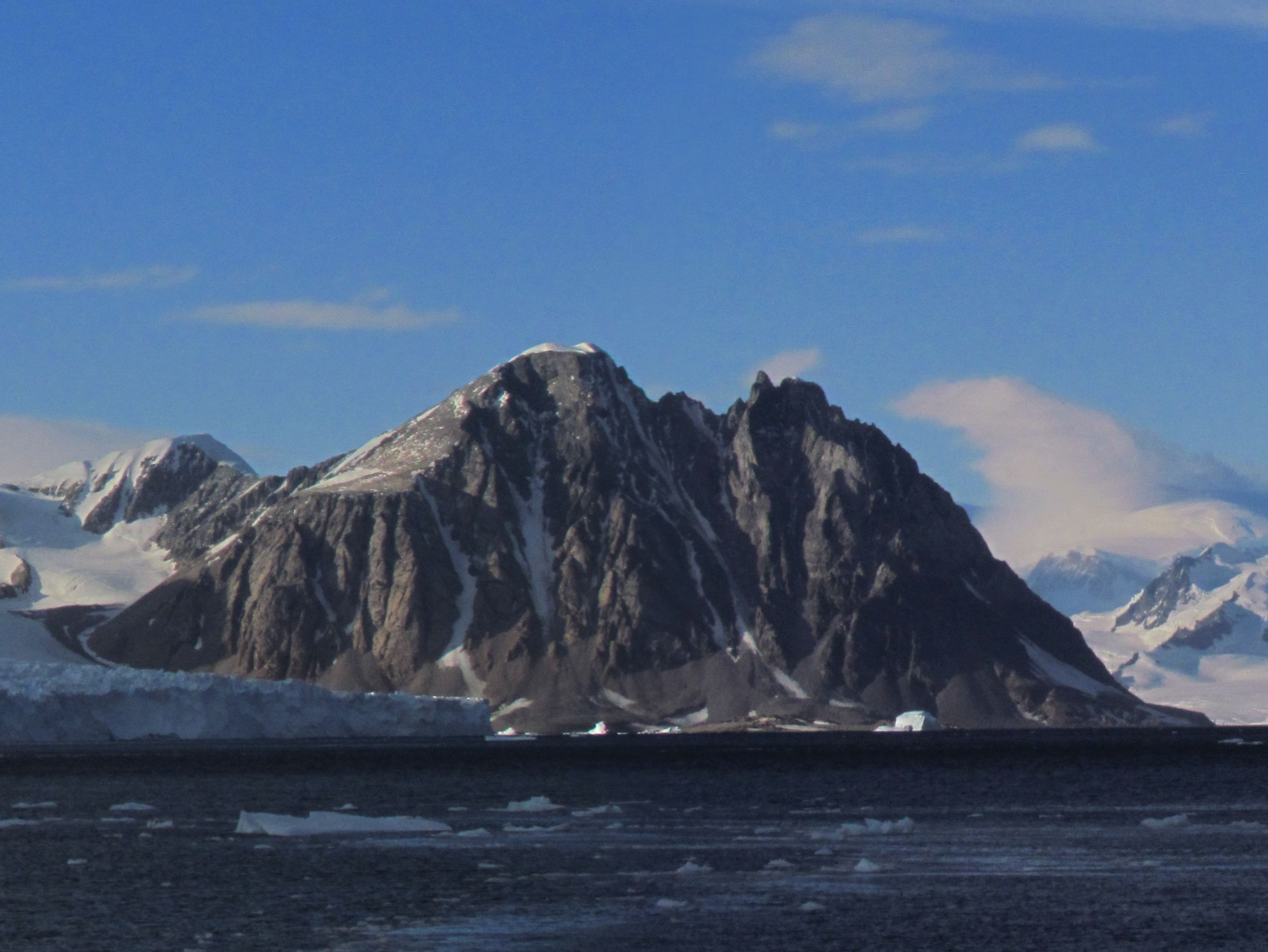
Punta Cuatro Romano

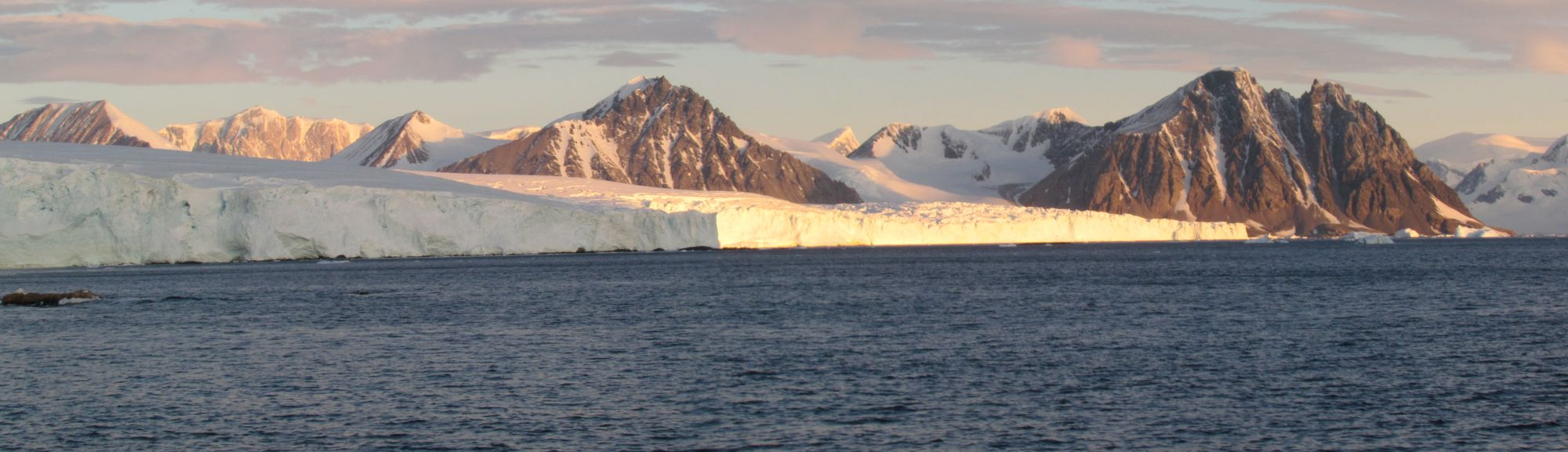
Uspallata Glacier

== Scientific activities ==
The LASAN laboratory (LAboratorio SAN Martín), managed by the Argentine Antarctic Institute, carries out active scientific research in the areas of geomagnetism, riometry, meteorology, ionospheric surveying through high altitude weather balloons, phytoplankton biology, satellite geodesy, glaciology, etc.

An ongoing bilateral agreement between Argentina and Germany has prompted cooperation on glacier movement observations.

== Ona Refuge ==
Ona Refuge
- Refuge
- Interactive map of Ona Refuge
- Country: Argentina
- Location in Antarctic Peninsula: Barry Island; Antarctic Peninsula; Antarctica
- Administered by: Tierra del Fuego Province
- Established: 1995
- Type: Seasonal
- Status: Operational

Refuge Ona (68°06′02″S 67°01′30″W) is an Argentine Antarctic refuge installed and operated by the government of the Tierra del Fuego Province. The refuge was opened in 1995 and it is located 4.5 kilometres (2.8 mi) from the San Martín Base on the glaciers of the Fallières Coast.

The construction of the refuge was part of the scientific project, called Perito Moreno, carried out under an agreement signed between the Instituto Antártico Argentino and the University of Freiburg in Germany. The researchers carry out studies on the displacement of glaciers and the dynamics of the snow layers. The shelter has a capacity for four people, food for 30 days, fuel, gas and first aid kit.

== Climate ==
The San Martín base has a polar climate that is moderated by its coastline position, hence having a 1.6 °C (34.9 °F) mean for the mildest month. The most significant feature in the area's climate is the violent wind, with speeds well in excess of 200 km/h (120 mph), which significantly increases the chill factor; such strong winds often blow for five or six days in a row, making it impossible to stay outdoors and turning any simple external work into a very dangerous task.

The temperature is variable: on average it reaches −37 °C (−35 °F) in winter and 8 °C (46 °F) in summer. The sea freezes between the months of June to November, its average thickness being about 1.2 m (3 ft 11 in). The average annual snowfall is 500 mm (20 in); some rains have been recorded in recent years.

Climate data for San Martín (1991–2020, extremes 1976–present)
Month	Jan	Feb	Mar	Apr	May	Jun	Jul	Aug	Sep	Oct	Nov	Dec	Year
Record high °C (°F)	13.7 (56.7)	14.3 (57.7)	12.5 (54.5)	9.8 (49.6)	9.8 (49.6)	7.9 (46.2)	9.7 (49.5)	14.0 (57.2)	8.0 (46.4)	9.4 (48.9)	11.1 (52.0)	11.5 (52.7)	14.3 (57.7)
Mean daily maximum °C (°F)	4.5 (40.1)	3.5 (38.3)	1.7 (35.1)	−0.5 (31.1)	−2.0 (28.4)	−5.5 (22.1)	−7.3 (18.9)	−6.7 (19.9)	−4.8 (23.4)	−1.6 (29.1)	1.5 (34.7)	3.5 (38.3)	−1.1 (30.0)
Daily mean °C (°F)	1.9 (35.4)	1.0 (33.8)	−0.8 (30.6)	−2.9 (26.8)	−4.8 (23.4)	−8.9 (16.0)	−11.5 (11.3)	−11.2 (11.8)	−9.0 (15.8)	−5.3 (22.5)	−1.8 (28.8)	0.8 (33.4)	−4.4 (24.1)
Mean daily minimum °C (°F)	−0.5 (31.1)	−1.3 (29.7)	−3.5 (25.7)	−5.5 (22.1)	−7.8 (18.0)	−13.0 (8.6)	−16.1 (3.0)	−16.3 (2.7)	−14.1 (6.6)	−9.6 (14.7)	−5.4 (22.3)	−2.0 (28.4)	−7.9 (17.8)
Record low °C (°F)	−10.7 (12.7)	−12.0 (10.4)	−21.0 (−5.8)	−24.0 (−11.2)	−31.0 (−23.8)	−37.5 (−35.5)	−42.0 (−43.6)	−47.0 (−52.6)	−41.0 (−41.8)	−35.4 (−31.7)	−23.6 (−10.5)	−15.0 (5.0)	−47.0 (−52.6)
Average precipitation mm (inches)	13.8 (0.54)	46.5 (1.83)	48.3 (1.90)	33.1 (1.30)	34.4 (1.35)	28.0 (1.10)	39.4 (1.55)	36.4 (1.43)	40.9 (1.61)	32.2 (1.27)	30.4 (1.20)	27.0 (1.06)	410.4 (16.16)
Average snowy days	9.4	10.7	13.7	13.1	14.6	12.3	13.9	13.8	15.5	15.1	12.2	9.9	154.1
Mean monthly sunshine hours	158.1	79.1	58.9	36.0	3.1	0.0	0.0	18.6	51.0	74.4	126.0	179.8	785.0
Mean daily sunshine hours	5.1	2.8	1.9	1.2	0.1	0.0	0.0	0.6	1.7	2.4	4.2	5.8	2.1
Source 1: Servicio Meteorológico Nacional (precipitation 2001–2010)
Source 2: Meteo Climat (record highs and lows)

== See also ==
- Argentine Antarctica
- List of Antarctic research stations
- List of Antarctic field camps
