= Boulder Point =

Boulder Point (68°11′S 67°0′W) is the southern extremity of Stonington Island, close off the west coast of Graham Land. It was first surveyed in 1940 by the United States Antarctic Service. Upon being resurveyed in 1948 by the Falkland Islands Dependencies Survey it was named for its prominent granite boulder.
