= Carse Point =

Carse Point (70°13′S 68°13′W) is the western extremity of a rock massif with four peaks, the highest at 1,250 metres (4,100 ft), standing at the south side of the mouth of Riley Glacier, Palmer Land, and fronting on George VI Sound. It lies separated from Mount Dixey to the northeast by a low ice-filled col, and from Mount Flower to the east by a small glacier. It appears that the massif of which this is the western extremity was first photographed from the air on November 23, 1935, by Lincoln Ellsworth and mapped from these photographs by W.L.G. Joerg. The point was surveyed in 1936 by the British Graham Land Expedition (BGLE) under John Rymill, and was named in 1954 for Verner D. Carse, member of the BGLE, 1934–37.
