= Terminus Nunatak =

Nunatak in Palmer Land, Antarctica

Terminus Nunatak (69°52′S 68°20′W) is a conspicuous nunatak, 670 m, standing between Eureka and Riley Glaciers and 0.5 nautical miles (0.9 km) inland from George VI Sound, on the west coast of Palmer Land. This nunatak was first photographed from the air on November 23, 1935, by Lincoln Ellsworth, and was mapped from these photographs by W.L.G. Joerg. First surveyed in 1936 by the British Graham Land Expedition (BGLE) under Rymill. Resurveyed in 1948 by the Falkland Islands Dependencies Survey (FIDS), and so named by them because the nunatak marks the end of the sledge route from the Wordie Ice Shelf, down Eureka Glacier, to George VI Sound.
