= Todd Glacier =

Glacier in Graham Land, Antarctica

Todd Glacier (68°3′S 67°3′W) is a glacier 7 nautical miles (13 km) long flowing southwest into Calmette Bay, western Graham Land. It was photographed from the air by Ronne Antarctic Research Expedition (RARE), 1947. Surveyed by British Antarctic Survey (BAS), 1961–62. Named by United Kingdom Antarctic Place-Names Committee (UK-APC) for Gertrude E. Todd, BAS Scientific Officer and Editor, employed in the London Office, 1950–63.

== Geographical setting ==
Todd Glacier descends from the northern flank of the Todd Icefield (located at approximately 56° 13' N, 129° 46' W) and feeds the head of north-facing Todd Valley in the Boundary Ranges of north-western British Columbia. Until the mid-20th century its tongue merged with four neighbouring tributary glaciers, the composite snout ending about 2.5 km down-valley at roughly 1000 m elevation; meltwater gives rise to Todd Creek, which drains to the Portland Canal fjord system. Since the 1970s every glacier in the valley has thinned and retreated, with aerial photographs showing terminus recession rates of roughly 9–76 metres per year between 1974 and 1997; Recession has exposed a fluted till forefield, small recessional moraines, deeply incised meltwater channels and steep lateral-moraine walls that rise to the Little Ice Age trimline (roughly 1200 m)—the valley-side boundary showing the glacier's maximum thickness during that period.

== Glaciological history ==
Dendroglaciological and radiocarbon studies carried out in the forefields of Todd, Two, Sage and Bug glaciers, together with work on the adjacent Surprise Glacier moraine, reveal a detailed late-Holocene record. Five principal advance intervals are recognised: (1) a pre-Tiedemann event older than 3000 ^{14}C yr BP (^{14}C yr BP = radiocarbon years before present, where "present" is conventionally AD 1950); (2) the regional Tiedemann advance at ~3000 ^{14}C yr BP; (3) a lesser-known expansion about 2300 ^{14}C yr BP; (4) a two-phase First-Millennium advance centred on ~1700 and ~1450 ^{14}C yr BP; and (5) a multi-stage Little Ice Age sequence that began before 750 ^{14}C yr BP and culminated in two late bursts after roughly AD 1760 and around AD 1900. The work hinges on tree ring cross-dating of in situ stumps and detrital boles, supplemented by perimeter-ring radiocarbon ages, allowing individual kill events to be tied to glacier margins with annual precision.

During the early Little Ice Age (roughly AD 883–1156) Two and Sage glaciers had already coalesced with Todd Glacier, filling the trunk valley; by 730–660 ^{14}C yr BP the combined front stood at the present forefield, as shown by buried forest horizons. Subsequent readvances in the eighteenth century felled trees on Surprise Glacier's lateral moraine (perimeter years 1746 and 1764), while a final surge in 1898–1899 pushed over mature subalpine fir on the west wall of Two-Glacier Valley. These events mark the greatest documented Holocene extent of the Todd Glacier system; the pronounced 20th-century retreat described above therefore represents a dramatic reversal from that late Little Ice Age maximum.
