= Marguerite Island =

Island in Adélie Land, Antarctica

- Location within Antarctica

Geography
- Location: Antarctica
- Coordinates: 66°47′S 141°23′E

Administration
- Administered under the Antarctic Treaty System

Demographics
- Population: Uninhabited

Marguerite Island is a rocky island 1.3 kilometres (0.7 nmi) northwest of Empereur Island and 3.2 kilometres (1.75 nmi) north-northwest of Cape Margerie, Antarctica. It was charted in 1951 by the French Antarctic Expedition and named by them for Marguerite, a character in Goethe's Faust.

== See also ==
- List of Antarctic and sub-Antarctic islands
