= Empereur Island =

Island of Antarctica

- Location within Antarctica

Geography
- Location: Antarctica
- Coordinates: 66°48′S 141°23′E

Administration
- Administered under the Antarctic Treaty System

Demographics
- Population: Uninhabited

Empereur Island is a rocky island 1.9 kilometres (1 nmi) north of Cape Margerie, lying immediately north of Breton Island in the entrance to Port Martin. It was photographed from the air by U.S. Navy Operation Highjump, 1946–47. It was charted by the French Antarctic Expedition under Andre-Frank Liotard, 1949–51, and so named because the first emperor penguin captured by the expedition was taken on this island.

== Important Bird Area ==
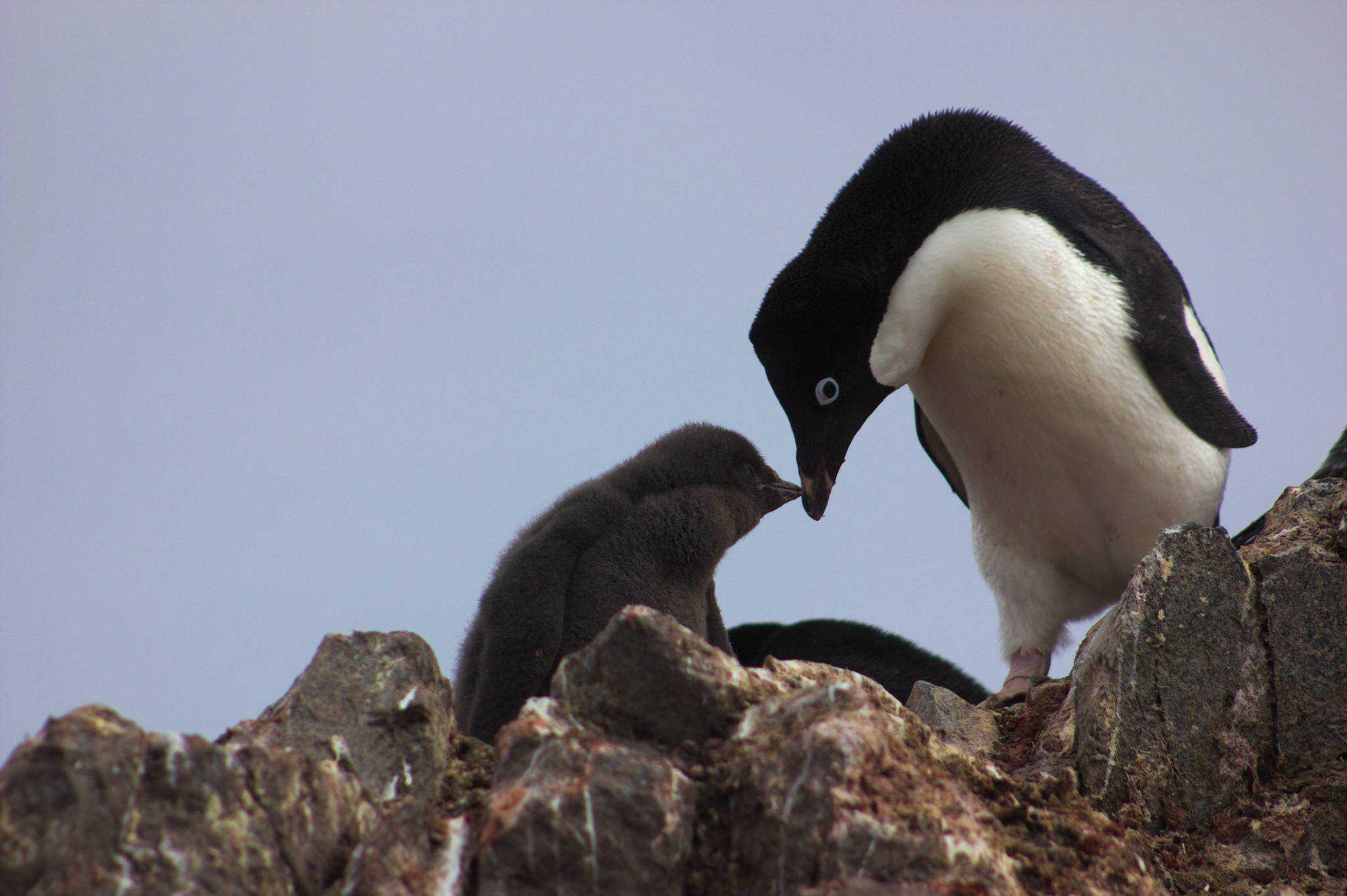
Large numbers of Adélie penguins breed in the IBA

A 283 ha site, including Empereur Island and Île des Manchots, Mont du Sphinx and Mont du Sabbat on the eastern coast of Cape Margerie, as well as Pointe de Cézembre and the intervening sea, has been designated an Important Bird Area (IBA) by BirdLife International because it supports about 35,000 breeding pairs of Adélie penguins, estimated from 2011 satellite imagery.

== See also ==
- List of Antarctic and Subantarctic islands
