= McHugo Peak =

Mountain in Antarctica

McHugo Peak (69°51′S 68°5′W) is a prominent peak rising to 1,250 metres (4,100 ft), marking the northwestern extremity of the Traverse Mountains on the Rymill Coast of Palmer Land, Antarctica. The peak was photographed from the air by the U.S. Navy, 1966, and was surveyed by the British Antarctic Survey, 1971–72. It was named by the UK Antarctic Place-Names Committee in 1977 after M. Barbara McHugo, Senior Map Officer at the Directorate of Overseas Surveys, 1958–86, with responsibility for Antarctic mapping, 1960–1984.
