= Mount Dixey =

Mountain in Palmer Land, Antarctica

Mount Dixey (70°10′S 68°4′W) is a mountain, 1,250 metres (4,100 ft) high, standing at the south side of Riley Glacier and 3 nautical miles (6 km) northeast of Carse Point, on the west coast of Palmer Land. It was first photographed from the air on November 23, 1935, by Lincoln Ellsworth, and mapped from these photographs by W.L.G. Joerg. It was first surveyed in 1936 by the British Graham Land Expedition (BGLE) under John Rymill, and was named in 1954 by members of the expedition for Neville Dixey, Chairman of Lloyd's of London in 1934, who raised a special fund at Lloyd's as a contribution towards the cost of the BGLE, 1934–37.
