= Traverse Mountains (Antarctica) =

Group of mountains in Palmer Land, Antarctica

Coordinates: 69°57′S 67°54′W

The Traverse Mountains of Antarctica are a group of almost ice-free mountains, rising to about 1,550 metres (5,090 ft), and including McHugo Peak, Mount Noel, Mount Allan and Mount Eissinger, between Eureka Glacier and Riley Glacier, east of Warren Ice Piedmont, in western Palmer Land. These mountains were first photographed from the air on November 23, 1935, by Lincoln Ellsworth and were mapped from these photographs by W.L.G. Joerg. They were first surveyed in 1936 by the British Graham Land Expedition (BGLE) under John Rymill and resurveyed in 1948 by the Falkland Islands Dependencies Survey. The name was first used by BGLE sledging parties because the mountains are an important landmark in the overland traverse from the Wordie Ice Shelf, down Eureka Glacier, to George VI Sound.
