= Debenham Islands =

Group of islands in Marguerite Bay, Antarctica

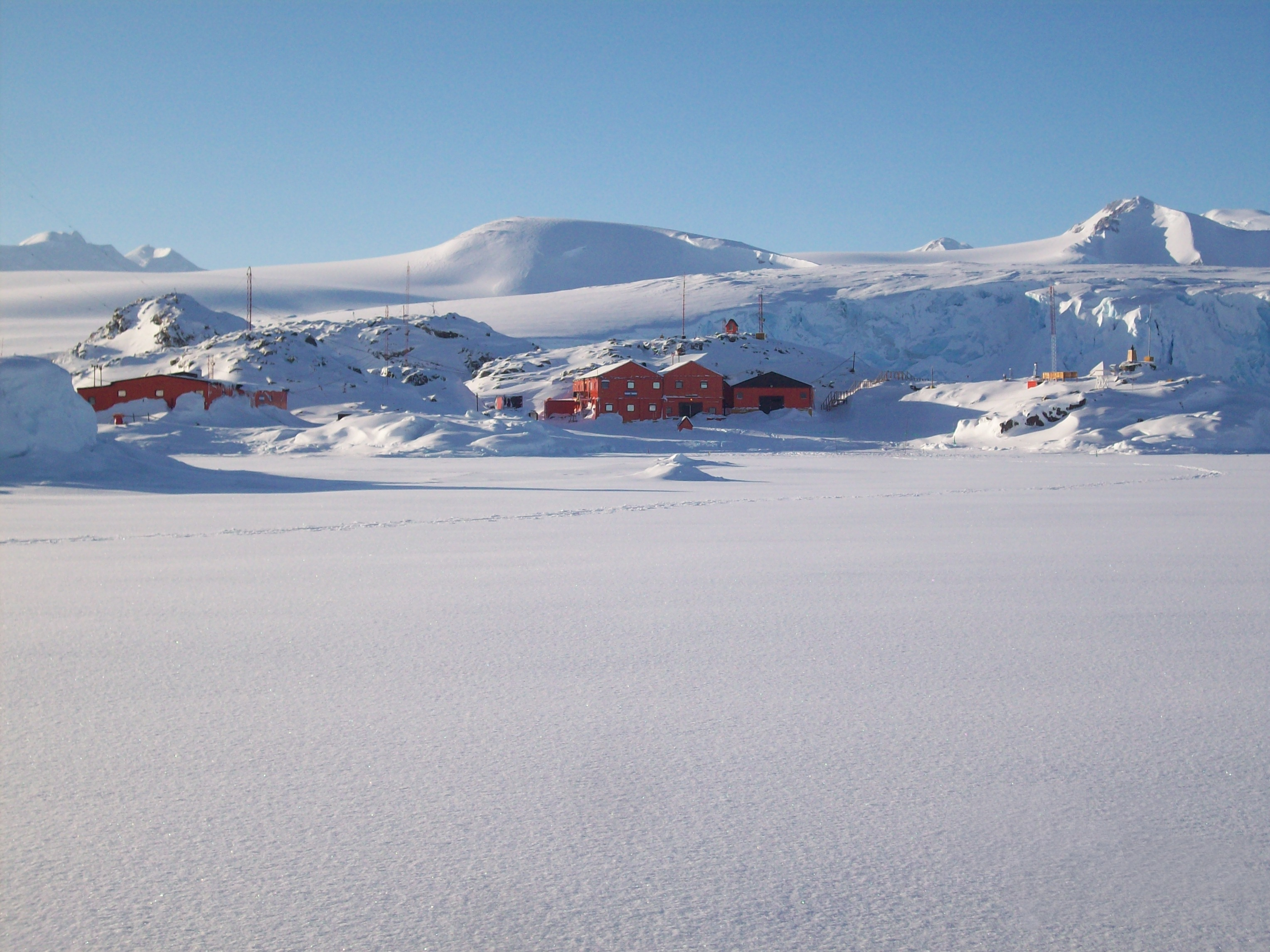
- San Martín Base on Barry Island

- Location within Antarctica

Geography
- Location: Marguerite Bay, Antarctica
- Coordinates: 68°08′S 67°07′W
- Archipelago: Debenham Islands
- Total islands: 6

The Debenham Islands (68°08′S 67°07′W) are a group of islands and rocks lying between Millerand Island and the west coast of Graham Land, Antarctica.

== Location ==
The Debenham Islands are in Marguerite Bay in Graham Land on the Fallières Coast of the Antarctic Peninsula. They are south of Cape Calmette, north of Millerand Island and west of the mouth of Northeast Glacier. The Argentinian San Martín Base is located on Barry Island.

== Discovery and name ==
The Debenham Islands were discovered and named by the British Graham Land Expedition (BGLE) (1934–37) under John Rymill. The BGLE base was on Barry Island, in the center of the group, during part of this time. They were named for Frank Debenham, who served as a member of the BGLE Advisory Committee.

== Powell Channel ==
Fallières Coast on Antarctic Peninsula.

68°08′S 67°07′W. A narrow channel between Millerand Island and the Debenham Islands. Named by the UK Antarctic Place-Names Committee (UK-APC) for Lieutenant John M. Powell, RN, who surveyed the channel in 1972.

== Islands ==
=== Barbara Island ===
68°08′S 67°06′W. The largest and northernmost of the Debenham Islands. Discovered by the BGLE, 1934-37, under Rymill, and named by him for a daughter of Frank Debenham.

=== Ann Island ===
68°08′S 67°06′W. An island lying southeast of Barbara Island, off the west coast of Graham Land. Discovered by the BGLE, 1934-37, under Rymill, and named by him for a daughter of Frank Debenham.

=== Barry Island ===
68°08′S 67°07′W. An island lying in the center of the Debenham Islands, off the west coast of Graham Land. Charted by the BGLE under Rymill, who used this island for a base in 1936 and 1937. Named by Rymill for the eldest son of Frank Debenham.

=== Brian Island ===
68°08′S 67°07′W. The westernmost of the Debenham Islands. Charted by the BGLE, 1934-37, under Rymill, who named it for a son of Frank Debenham.

=== Audrey Island ===
68°08′S 67°07′W. The southernmost island in the Debenham Islands, off the west coast of Graham Land. Discovered by the BGLE, 1934-37, under Rymill, and named by him for a daughter of Frank Debenham.

=== June Island ===
68°08′S 67°07′W. An island in the Debenham Islands lying close southwest of Audrey Island. Discovered and charted by the BGLE, 1934-37, under Rymill, who named it for a daughter of Frank Debenham.

== Sources ==
- Alberts, Fred G., ed. (1995), Geographic Names of the Antarctic (PDF) (2 ed.), United States Board on Geographic Names This article incorporates public domain material from websites or documents of the United States Board on Geographic Names.
- "Base San Martín" (in Spanish). Fundaciòn Marambio. Archived from the original on 28 December 2013.
- Palmer Land, USGS: United States Geological Survey

This article incorporates public domain material from websites or documents of the United States Geological Survey.
