= Breton Island (Antarctica) =

Island in Adélie Land, Antarctica

- Location within Antarctica

Geography
- Location: Antarctica
- Coordinates: 66°48′S 141°23′E

Administration
- Administered under the Antarctic Treaty System

Demographics
- Population: Uninhabited

Breton Island is a small rocky island lying 0.4 kilometres (0.2 nmi) southwest of Empereur Island. It was charted in 1950 by the French Antarctic Expedition and named by them for their largely Breton crew.

== See also ==
- List of Antarctic and sub-Antarctic islands
