= Fishtrap Cove =

Cove in Antarctica

edit_timestampFishtrap Cove (68°11′S 67°0′W) is a small cove 0.1 nautical miles (0.2 km) northwest of Boulder Point on the southwest side of Stonington Island, close off the west coast of Graham Land, Antarctica. It was first surveyed by the United States Antarctic Service, 1939–41, and resurveyed in 1946–47 by the Falkland Islands Dependencies Survey (FIDS), who so named it because FIDS parties used this cove for setting fish traps.
