= Mount Flower =

Mountain in Palmer Land, Antarctica

Coordinates: 70°12′S 67°53′W

Mount Flower is a mountain with two summits, the highest at 1,465 metres (4,800 ft), standing 6.5 nautical miles (12 km) inland from Carse Point and George VI Sound, on the west coast of Palmer Land, Antarctica. This mountain lies partially within the margin of the area first photographed from the air on November 23, 1935, by Lincoln Ellsworth, and its northern extremity was mapped from these photographs by W.L.G. Joerg. It was first surveyed in 1936 by the British Graham Land Expedition (BGLE) under John Rymill, and was named by the UK Antarctic Place-Names Committee in 1954 for Geoffrey C. Flower, an instructor in survey at the Royal Geographical Society, 1933–40, who helped with the organization and working out of the surveys made by the BGLE, 1934–37.
