= Calmette Bay =

Bay in Graham Land, Antarctica

Calmette Bay (68°3′S 67°10′W) is a small bay between Camp Point and Cape Calmette, on the west coast of Graham Land. It was charted by the British Graham Land Expedition under John Rymill, 1934–1937, who named the bay for its southern entrance point, Cape Calmette.
