= Cape Calmette =

Cape in Graham Land, Antarctica

Cape Calmette (68°4′S 67°13′W) is a cape marking the western extremity of a rocky peninsula which rises more than 625 metres (2,050 ft) and projects from the west coast of Graham Land for 3 nautical miles (6 km) to form the southern shore of Calmette Bay. It was discovered in 1909 by the French Antarctic Expedition under Jean-Baptiste Charcot, who from a distance mistook this cape for an island; the British Graham Land Expedition under John Rymill, 1934–1937, determined the true nature of the feature. It was named by Charcot for Gaston Calmette, editor of Le Figaro, who furnished the French Antarctic Expedition with copies of this newspaper for the two years preceding the expedition.
