= Riley Glacier =

Glacier in Antarctica

- Location within Antarctica
- Location: Palmer Land, Antarctica
- Coordinates: 70°3′S 68°20′W
- Length: 14 nmi (26 km; 16 mi)
- Width: 17 nmi (31 km; 20 mi)
- Thickness: unknown
- Terminus: George VI Sound
- Status: unknown

Riley Glacier is a heavily crevassed glacier, 14 nautical miles (26 km) long and 17 nautical miles (31 km) wide, flowing westward from the west side of Palmer Land into George VI Sound between the Traverse Mountains and Mount Dixey. First sighted and surveyed in 1936 by the British Graham Land Expedition (BGLE) under Rymill. Resurveyed in 1949 by the Falkland Islands Dependencies Survey (FIDS) and named for Quintin T.P.M. Riley, assistant meteorologist of the BGLE, 1934–37. The glacier sits at 70° 06' 00.0" S latitude and 67° 55' 00.0" W longitude.

== See also ==
- List of glaciers in the Antarctic: I–Z
- Mount Eubanks, an isolated mountain near the head of Riley Glacier
