= Stonington Island =

Island in Antarctica

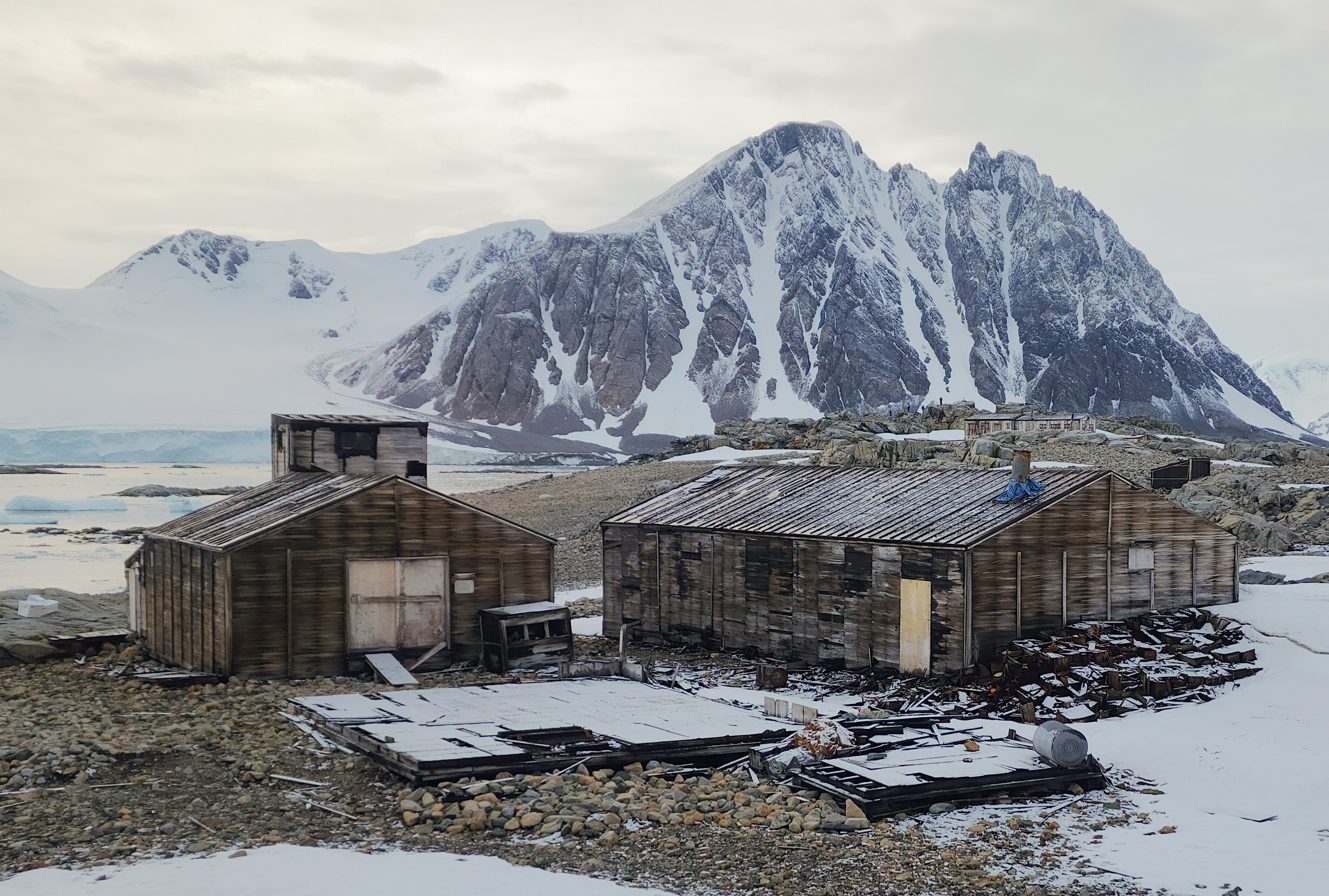
East Base on Stonington Island

Stonington Island is a rocky island lying 1.8 kilometres (1.1 miles) northeast of Neny Island in the eastern part of Marguerite Bay off the west coast of Graham Land, Antarctica. It is 0.75 kilometres (0.47 miles) long from north-west to south-east and 0.37 kilometres (0.23 miles) wide, yielding an area of 20 hectares (49 acres). It was formerly connected by a drifted snow slope to Northeast Glacier on the mainland. Highest elevation is Anemometer Hill which rises to 25 metres (82 feet).

== History ==
Stonington Island was chosen as the site for the East Base of the United States Antarctic Service (USAS) Expedition (1939–41). It was named after Stonington, Connecticut, home port of the sloop Hero in which Captain Nathaniel Palmer sighted the Antarctic continent in 1820.

=== Base E ===
Base E
- Antarctic research station
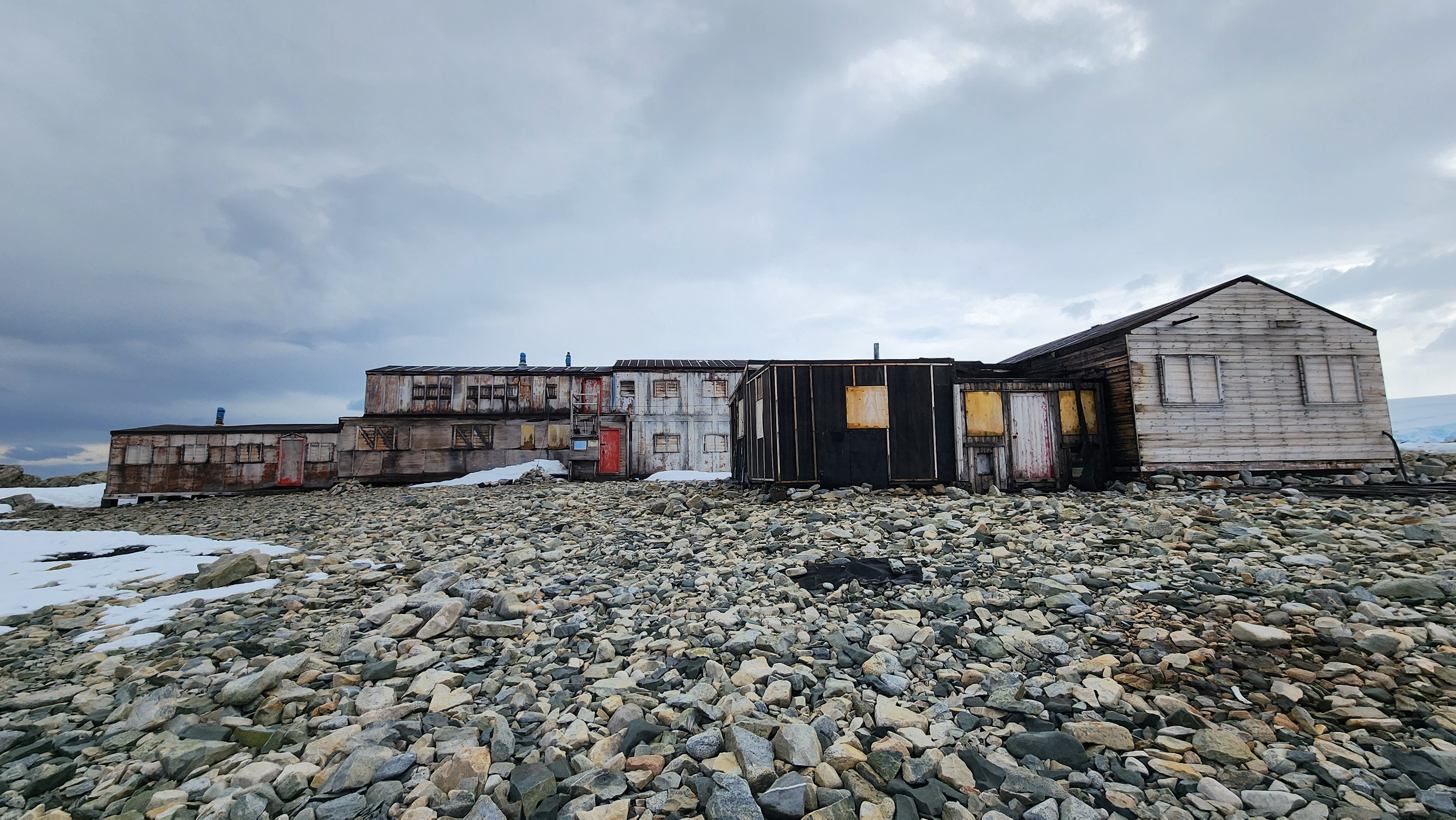
- Interactive map of Base E
- Coordinates: 68°11′09″S 66°59′41″W
- Established: 1946
- Closed: 1992

Government
  - Type: Administration
  - Body: BAS, United Kingdom
- Active times: All year-round

The island was also home to the British Antarctic Survey (BAS) Station E and the Ronne Antarctic Research Expedition, and was the base of operations for many historic Antarctic Peninsula surveying missions in the 1940s. Station E was occupied until 23 February 1975 and the main building was known as Trepassey House. It was cleaned and repaired in 1992. In 1995, the huts became a protected historic site with the name Base E and number HSM-64.

=== Historic sites ===
A protected area on the island consists of the buildings and artifacts at East Base (with their immediate environs) that were erected and used during the two US wintering expeditions. The size of the area is about 1,000 metres (1,100 yards) north-south, from the beach to Northeast Glacier adjacent to Back Bay, and 500 metres (550 yards) east-west. It has been designated a Historic Site or Monument (HSM 55) following a proposal by the US to the Antarctic Treaty Consultative Meeting (ATCM). The British Station E research station is also considered to be of historical importance in relating to both the early period of exploration and the later BAS history of the 1960s and 1970s, and it has been similarly designated as a Historic Site or Monument (HSM 64) following a proposal by the United Kingdom to the ATCM.

=== Significant Events ===
Stonington Island was the site of the first women to overwinter in Antarctica. Americans Edith ‘Jackie’ Ronne – whose husband Finn Ronne was the base leader at East Base – and Jennie Darlington spent the 1947-48 winter at Stonington on the way to becoming the first women to spend a year on the continent. The Ronne Ice Shelf would later be named in honour of Edith.

On 22 December 2022, two British citizens, Caius and Rosie, traveling on board the expedition cruise ship Greg Mortimer were legally married in a simple ceremony conducted by a Marriage Officer appointed by the Commissioner of the British Antarctic Territory, becoming the first people in history to be married at Stonington Island.

== Environment ==
=== Climate ===
Climate data for Stonington Islands
| Month | Jan | Feb | Mar | Apr | May | Jun | Jul | Aug | Sep | Oct | Nov | Dec | Year |
|---|---|---|---|---|---|---|---|---|---|---|---|---|---|
| Record high °C (°F) | 6 (43) | 7 (45) | 8 (46) | 7 (45) | 4 (39) | 7 (45) | 4 (39) | 4 (39) | 5 (41) | 6 (43) | 8 (46) | 7 (45) | 8 (46) |
| Mean daily maximum °C (°F) | 3 (37) | 1 (34) | −2 (28) | −4 (25) | −6 (21) | −8 (18) | −8 (18) | −9 (16) | −8 (18) | −4 (25) | −3 (27) | 2 (36) | −4 (25) |
| Mean daily minimum °C (°F) | −3 (27) | −4 (25) | −8 (18) | −10 (14) | −14 (7) | −17 (1) | −18 (0) | −19 (−2) | −16 (3) | −13 (9) | −9 (16) | −3 (27) | −11 (12) |
| Record low °C (°F) | −12 (10) | −11 (12) | −35 (−31) | −27 (−17) | −36 (−33) | −37 (−35) | −36 (−33) | −37 (−35) | −39 (−38) | −29 (−20) | −20 (−4) | −13 (9) | −39 (−38) |
| Average precipitation mm (inches) | 10 (0.4) | 15 (0.6) | 25 (1.0) | 25 (1.0) | 43 (1.7) | 28 (1.1) | 33 (1.3) | 25 (1.0) | 41 (1.6) | 43 (1.7) | 23 (0.9) | 5 (0.2) | 316 (12.5) |
| Average precipitation days | 3 | 4 | 7 | 7 | 9 | 6 | 7 | 7 | 7 | 8 | 5 | 1 | 71 |

=== Important Bird Area ===
A circular, 500 hectares (1,200 acres) site on the island has been designated an Important Bird Area (IBA) by BirdLife International because it supports a breeding colony of about 135 pairs of imperial shags. Other birds breeding at the site include south polar skuas and Antarctic terns.

== Features ==
- Anemometer Hill, northeast of Fishtrap Cove on Stonington Island
- Gull Channel, between Dynamite Island and Stonington Island
- Haulaway Point, midway along the northeast side of Stonington Island
- Mast Hill, about 100 meters from the western end of Stonington Island
- Tragic Corner, a bluff marking the northeast end of Boulding Ridge

== See also ==
- Crime in Antarctica
- Edith Ronne
- List of Antarctic and subantarctic islands
- List of Antarctic field camps
- List of Antarctic research stations
